= Dura-Europos =

Ancient Syrian city

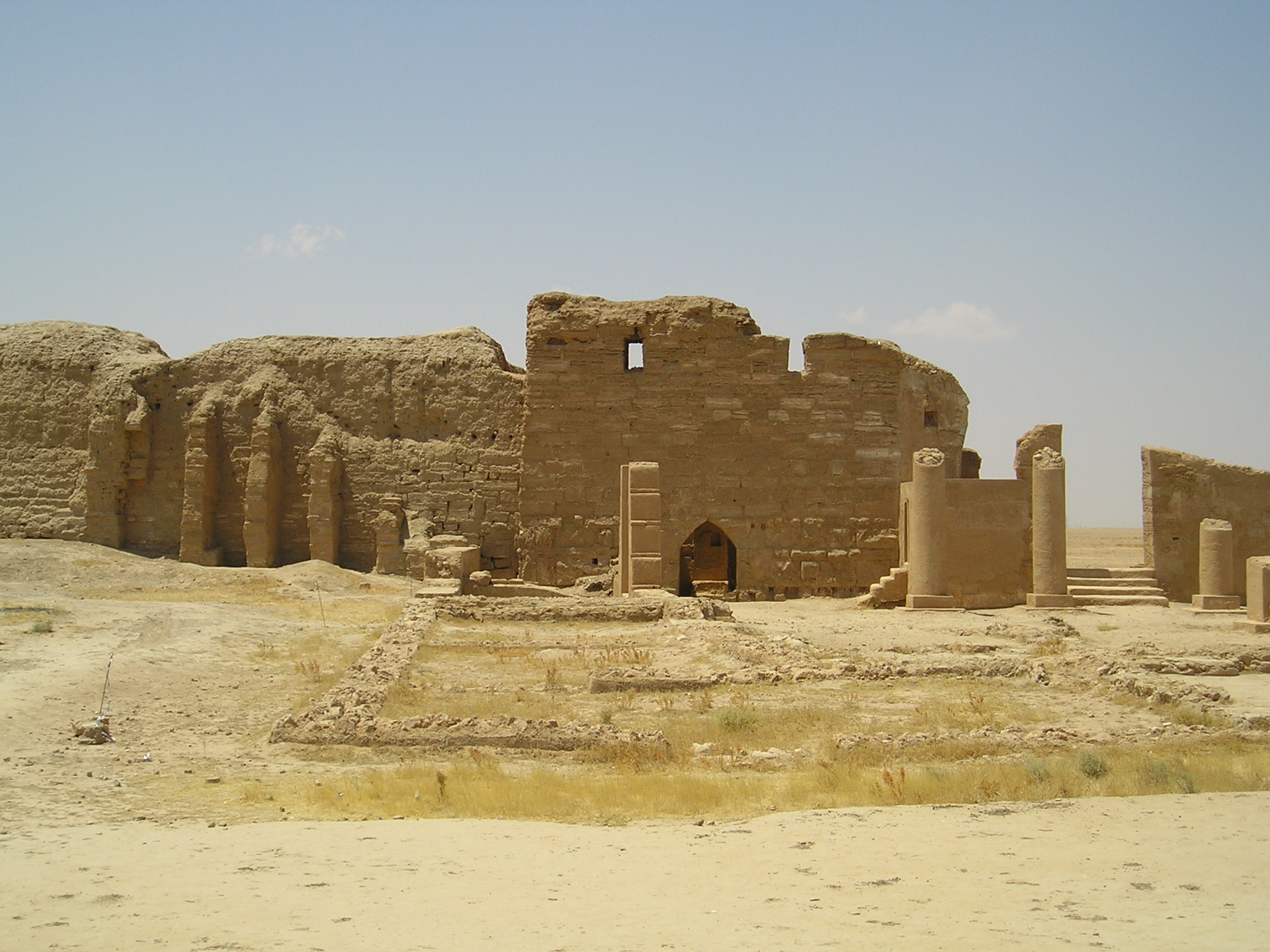
- Temple of Bel, Dura-Europos

- Location within Syria Location within Near East
- 34.747°N 40.730°E
- Type: settlement
- Periods: Classical antiquity
- Cultures: Hellenistic, Parthian, Roman
- Location: near Salhiyah, Syria
- Region: West Asia

History
- Built: c. 300 BC
- Abandoned: 256–257 AD

Site notes
- Material: Various
- Area: Syrian Desert
- Excavation dates: 1922–1937; 1986–present
- Archaeologists: Clark Hopkins; James Henry Breasted; Franz Cumont; Michael Rostovtzeff; Pierre Leriche
- Condition: Partially destroyed and looted by the Islamic State
- Owner: Public
- Public access: No, closed due to the war

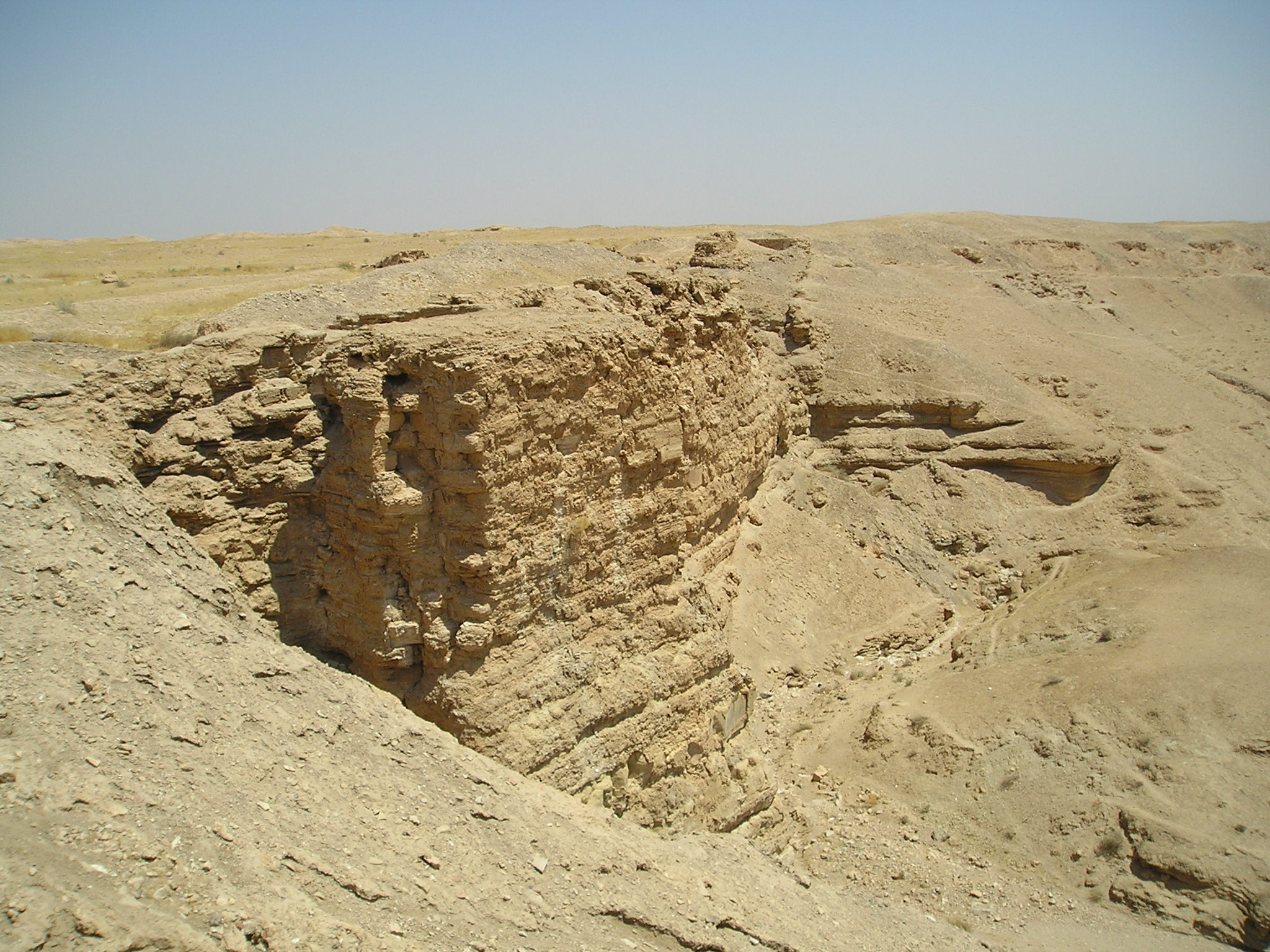
A view of the southern wadi and part of the walls of the city of Dura-Europos.

Dura-Europos (Note: also spelled Dura Europos or Dura-Europus; Koine Greek: Δοῦρα Εὐρωπός, romanized: Doûra Eurōpós, [ˈduːra ewroːˈpos]; Latin: Dūra Eurōpus, [ˈduːra eu̯ˈroːpʊs]) was a Hellenistic, Parthian, and Roman border city built on an escarpment 90 metres (300 feet) above the southwestern bank of the Euphrates river. It is located near the village of Salhiyé, in present-day Syria. Dura-Europos was founded around 300 BC by Seleucus I Nicator, who founded the Seleucid Empire as one of the Diadochi of Alexander the Great.

In 113 BC, the Parthians conquered the city, and held it, with one brief Roman intermission (114 AD), until 165 AD. Under Parthian rule, it became an important provincial administrative centre. The Romans decisively captured Dura-Europos in 165 AD and greatly enlarged it as their easternmost stronghold in Mesopotamia, until it was captured by the Sasanian Empire after a siege in 256–257 AD. Its population was deported, and the abandoned city eventually became covered by sand and mud and disappeared from sight.

Dura-Europos is of extreme archaeological importance, and was called the "Pompeii of the Desert". As it was abandoned after its conquest in 256–57 AD, nothing was built over it and no later building programs obscured the architectural features of the ancient city. Its location on the edge of empires made for a commingling of cultural traditions, much of which was preserved under the city's ruins. Some remarkable finds have been brought to light, including numerous temples, wall decorations, inscriptions, military equipment, tombs, and even dramatic evidence of the Sasanian siege.

It was looted and mostly destroyed between 2011 and 2014 by the Islamic State during the Syrian Civil War.

== History ==
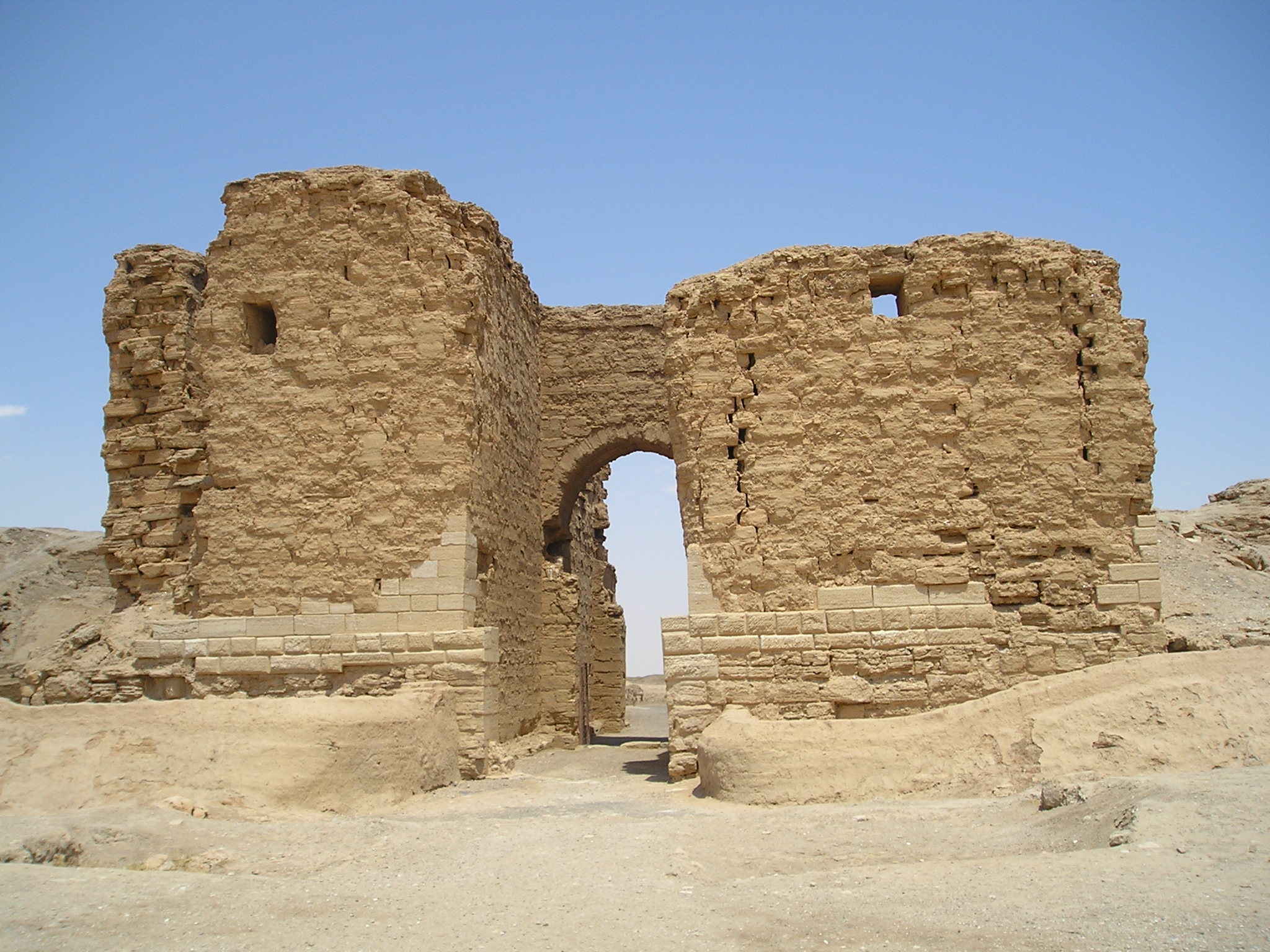
The Palmyrene Gate, the principal entrance to the city of Dura-Europos.

=== Foundation and early history ===
Originally a fortress, the city was founded around 300 BC as Dura ("fortress" in Aramaic) at the intersection of an east–west trade route and the trade route along the Euphrates. The city was called Europos by Greeks in honor of the origin of Seleucus Nikator, who founded it and was born in Europos in Macedonia. In ancient times, either designation stood alone; the combination of "Dura-Europos" is modern and was coined by Franz Cumont in 1922.

The city was probably built on the site of a previous town; a clay tablet dating to King Hammurabi of Hana's times, 1900 BC, refers to the place as Da-ma-ra. (Note: The tablet was found in the wall of the Temple of Atargatis.) It is the only cuneiform writing found at Dura; no other evidence has been found. The ancient settlement had probably been deserted for a long time when Dura was founded. The earliest mention of Dura-Europos can be found in the Parthian Stations by the geographer Isidore of Charax (c. 26 BC).

Dura controlled the river crossing on the route between Seleucus's newly founded cities of Antioch and Seleucia on the Tigris. Its rebuilding as a great city after the Hippodamian model, with rectangular blocks defined by cross-streets ranged round a large central agora, took place in the 2nd century BC. The traditional view of Dura-Europos as a great caravan city is modified by the discoveries of local manufactures and traces of close ties with Palmyra. Dura-Europos is now seen as owing its development to its role as a regional capital.

After the siege and destruction of the city its names were forgotten by local people, and the site was known as Salihiyeh, "a name thought to refer to Saladin". In Ottoman times the ruins were known as Qan Qal'esi, "Castle of Blood". Pierre Leriche, excavations director of the site in the early 2000s, opposes the name Dura-Europos, because it "obscures what he sees as the fundamental Greekness of the city" and proposes to use "Europos-Dura" instead.

ἔνθεν Δοῦρα, Νικάνορος πόλις, κτίσμα Μακεδόνων, ὑπὸ δὲ Ἑλλήνων Εὔρωπος καλεῖται.
[Then comes Dura, the city of Nicanor, a foundation of the Macedonians, called Europos by the Greeks.]

Isidore is the only ancient historian who mentioned that the city had two different names. Isidore's account helped to identify the site, because both "Dura" and "Europos" were not unique names for that region.

When the town was founded, agricultural land was allotted to the members of the garrison, the size and quality of the allotments according to military rank. As the historian Paul Kosmin wrote, during its early history Dura-Europos was neither entirely a military outpost nor a polis, but something in-between:

Out of this meager evidence, the early settlement of Europos emerges as an entity ambiguously situated between a simple fortress and a full polis. The absences are striking. As far as can be perceived, in terms of civic architecture and urbanism, third-century Europos lacked a temple, gymnasium, theater, and a "Hippodamian" street plan. In terms of sociopolitical phenomena, it lacked a developed epigraphic habit, representative civic government, sophisticated bureaucracy, and its own mint (bar one short episode). The administrative center ("palace"), patterns of land ownership, royal cult, and state officials show, however, it was more than a fortified army community, isolated from its local and imperial environments. Its location and dependent territory gave Europos a dynamic and self-generating potential to expand and develop into the important, wealthier, and more complex settlement it would become.

In 113 BC, the Parthian Empire conquered Dura-Europos, and held it, with one brief intermission, until 165 AD, when it was taken by the Romans. The Parthian period was that of expansion at Dura-Europos, an expansion that was facilitated by the town losing its function as a military outpost. All the space enclosed by the walls gradually became occupied, and the influx of new inhabitants with Semitic and Iranian names alongside descendants of the original Macedonian colonists contributed to an increase in the population, which was a multicultural one, as inscriptions in Greek, Latin, Hebrew, various Aramaic dialects (Hatran, Palmyrene, Syriac), Middle Persian, Parthian, and Safaitic testify. In the 1st century BC, it served as a frontier fortress of the Parthian Empire.

=== Rebuilding of the city ===
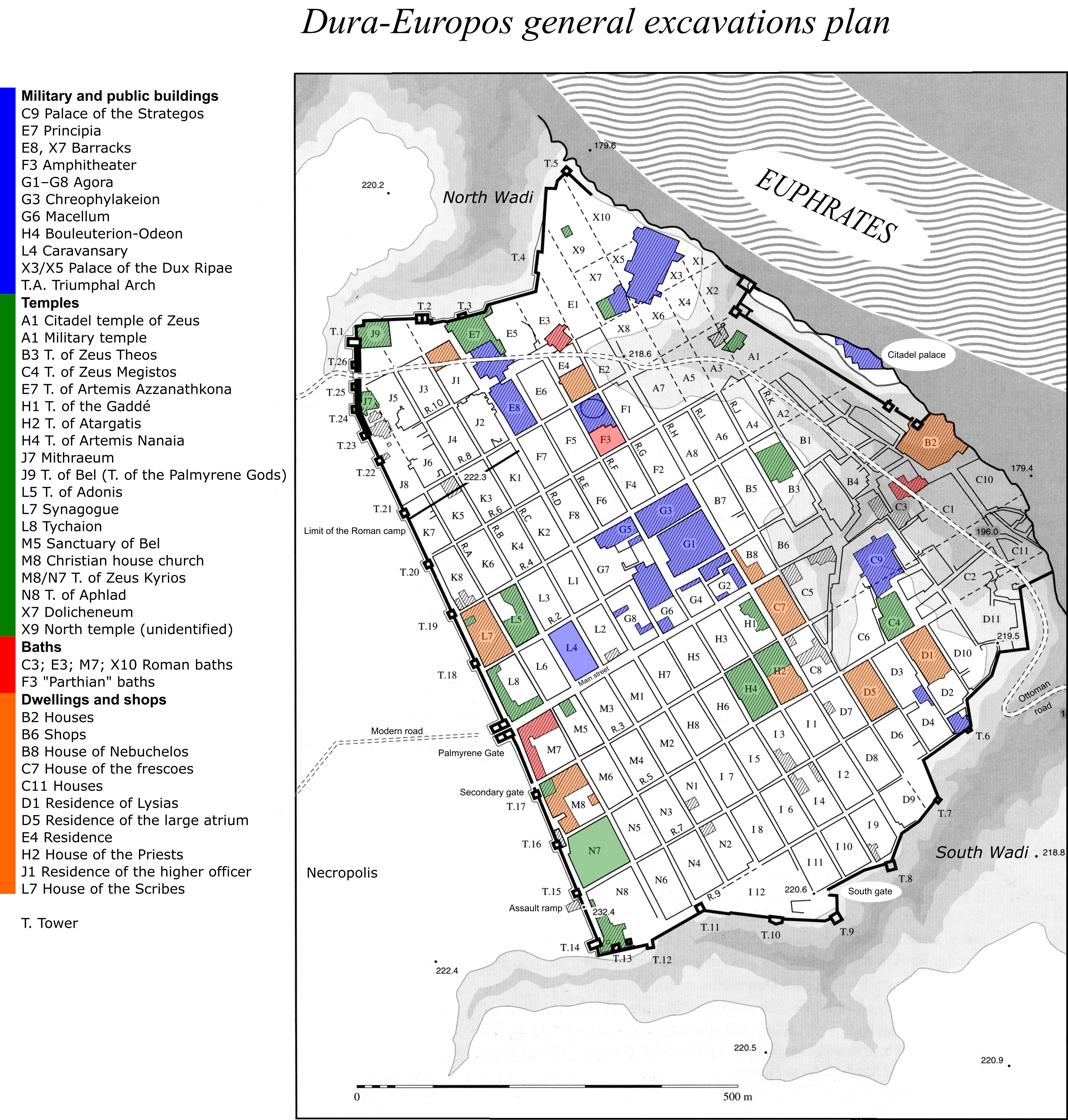
Dura-Europos general excavations plan.

The entirely original architecture of Dura-Europos was perfected during the Parthian period. This period was characterized by a progressive evolution of Greek concepts toward new formulas in which regional traditions, particularly Babylonian ones, played an increasing role. These innovations affected both religious and domestic buildings. Although Iranian influence is difficult to find in the architecture of Dura-Europos, in figurative art the influence of Parthian art is felt.

In 114 AD, the Emperor Trajan occupied the city for a couple of years: the Third Cyrenaica legion erected a "Triumphal Arch" west of the Palmyrene Gate. Upon the death of Trajan in 117, Rome relinquished Mesopotamia to the Parthians, but Dura was retaken by the Roman army of Lucius Verus during the Roman–Parthian War of 161–166.

The townspeople, however, retained considerable freedom as inhabitants of the regional headquarters for the section of the river between the Khabur River and modern Abu Kamal. The historian Ross Burns states that, in exchange, the city's military role was abandoned. Its original Greek settler population was increasingly outnumbered by people of Semitic stock; and by the first century BC, the city was predominantly eastern in character.

The city regained its importance as a military outpost, when the Romans established it as a starting point for the conquest of the territories of Osroene, and as an outpost for expeditions against the Parthian empire and their capital on the Tigris in 198 AD. The city was later a border post of the Roman "Kingdom of Palmyra".

In A.D. 194, Emperor Septimius Severus divided the province of Syria to limit the power of its previously rebellious governors. As a result, Dura became part of the new province of Syria Coele. In its later years, it also attained the status of a Roman colonia, which, by the third century, was what James (Henry Breasted) calls an "honorary title for an important town." He suggests that the "Roman authorities wanted to present Dura as an important city of the Roman province."

— Dura-Europos: Crossroad of Cultures by Carly Silver

The military importance of the site was confirmed after 209 AD: the northern part of the site was occupied by a Roman camp, isolated by a brick wall; soldiers were housed among civilians, among others, in the so-called "House of Scribes". Romans built the palace of the commander of the military region on the edge of a cliff. The city then had several sanctuaries, beside the temples, dedicated to the Greek gods Zeus and Artemis. There were shrines, dating from the 1st century AD, dedicated to Mithra, to Palmyrene gods, and to local deities.

In 216 AD, a small amphitheater for soldiers was built in the military area, while the new synagogue, completed in 244 AD, and a house of Christian worship, were embellished with frescos of important characters wearing Roman tunics, caftans, and Parthian trousers. These splendid paintings, which cover the walls, testify to the richness of the Jewish and Christian communities. The population of Dura-Europos is estimated at 10,000–15,000 people, at the most; more conservative estimates say that the agriculture of that region could only support a population of about 5,000–6,000 people.

The city received the status of "colonia" after the year 254 AD; official documents called the city "the 'colony of the Europeans of Seleukos Nikator' (κωλονεία Εὐροπαίων Σελεύκου Νεικάτορος)."

The good state of preservation of these buildings and their frescoes was due to their location, close to the main city wall facing west, and to the military necessity of strengthening the wall. The Sassanid Persians had become adept at tunneling under such walls in order to undermine them and create breaches. As a countermeasure, the Roman garrison decided to sacrifice the street and the buildings along the wall by filling them with rubble, to bolster the wall in case of a Persian mining operation. So, the Christian chapel, the synagogue, the Mithraeum, and many other buildings were entombed. The Romans also buttressed the walls from the outside with an earthen mound forming a glacis, sealed with a casing of mud brick to prevent erosion. As J.A. Baird writes, "the threat by the Sasanians was keenly felt by the Roman military, and what had been a walled city became a fortress—literally, in that it became a defensive place. A huge embankment was built against the interior of the city walls to hold back the Sasanian incursion, deliberately and with great effort involving the methodical destruction of buildings and the moving of many metric tonnes of earth, ruining a huge swathe of the site".

=== Siege and destruction ===
Successive steps of backfilling of the Wall street in Dura-Europos and the subsequent destruction of the synagogue. After Kraeling, 1956.

There is no written record of the Sasanian siege of Dura. However, archaeologists have uncovered striking evidence of the siege and how it progressed.

The buttressing of the walls would be tested in 256 AD when Shapur I besieged the city. True to the fears of the defenders, Shapur set his engineers to undermine what archaeologists called Tower 19, two towers north of the Palmyrene Gate. When the Romans became aware of the threat, they dug a countermine with the aim of meeting the Persian effort and attacking them before they could finish their work. The Persians had already dug complex galleries along the wall by the time the Roman countermine reached them. They managed to fight off the Roman attack, and when the city defenders noticed the flight of soldiers from the countermine, it was quickly sealed. The wounded and stragglers were trapped inside, where they died. (It was the coins found with these Roman soldiers that dated the siege to AD 256.) The countermine was successful, for the Persians abandoned their operations at Tower 19.

Next, the Sassanids attacked Tower 14, the southernmost along the western wall. It overlooked a deep ravine to the south and it was from that direction that it was attacked. This time the mining operation was partially successful, in that it caused the tower and adjacent walls to subside. However, Roman countermeasure bolstered the wall and prevented it from collapsing.

This brought on a third attempt at breaching the city wall. A ramp was raised, attacking Tower 14; but, as it was being built and the garrison fought to stop the progress of the ramp, another mine was started near the ramp. Its purpose was not to cause a collapse of the wall—the buttress had been successful—but to pass under it and penetrate the city. This tunnel was built to allow the Persians four abreast to move through it. It eventually pierced the inner embankment and, when the ramp was completed, Dura's end had come. As Persian troops charged up the ramp, their counterparts in the tunnel would have invaded the city with little opposition, as nearly all the defenders would have been on the wall, attempting to repel the attack from the ramp. The city was then abandoned, its population deported.

The siege was notable for the early use of chemical weapons by the attacking Persian army. During the siege the attackers dug several underground shaft mines under the city walls. The Romans dug tunnels to reach the mines and fight the diggers underground. In one such tunnel, when the Romans broke through into the Sassanian tunnel, the tunnelers ignited a mixture of sulfur and pitch, producing a cloud of poisonous gas, sulfur dioxide, which killed 19 Romans and 1 Persian, one of which was carrying a coin dated 256, allowing the dating of the siege. Archaeologists excavated the scene in the 1930s. In 2009, tests showed the presence of sulfur dioxide inside the tunnel. An archaeologist at the University of Leicester suggested that bitumen and sulphur crystals were ignited to create poisonous gas, which was then funnelled through the tunnel with the use of underground chimneys and bellows. The Roman soldiers had been constructing a countermine, and Sasanian forces are believed to have released the gas when their mine was breached by the Roman countermine. The lone Persian soldier discovered among the bodies is believed to be the individual responsible for releasing the gas before the fumes overcame him as well.

Shapur I destroyed not only Dura-Europos, but also other Palmyrene trade colonies along the Euphrates, including the colony at Anah, in 253. The sixth-century historian Peter the Patrician wrote that Odaenathus approached Shapur I to negotiate Palmyrene interests but was rebuffed and the gifts sent to the Persians were thrown into the river. The date for the attempted negotiations is debated: some scholars, including John F. Drinkwater, set the event in 253; while others, such as Alaric Watson, set it in 256, following the destruction of Dura-Europos.

=== After the siege ===
Clark Hopkins, the field director at Dura-Europos in the 1930s, opened his book The Discovery of Dura-Europos with an epigram:

After the siege and victory by the Persians in AD 256, the record is blank. The mute testimony that remained was of a site desolate and forlorn, where the lonely and level sands covered the bones of the city and stretched away across the desert.

Some evidence of a Sasanian presence at Dura after the sack of the city was found, but is limited to several coins, and some burials. Many buildings apparently stood empty for a time before they collapsed: a house in a part of the site near the river that was excavated by the Franco-Syrian expedition in the 2000s had its floors covered in disarticulated rodent skeletons and owl pellets, apparently from time when birds inhabited the emptied homes. Coin hoards were found, which indicate that people hoped to return to the city.

Historians argue whether Dura-Europos was completely abandoned after the siege of 256. Lucinda Dirven wrote that, according to Ammianus Marcellinus, Dura-Europos was a deserted town when Julian's army passed there in 363. There is evidence from a Syriac document called Life of the Martyr Mu'Ain, dating from the fifth century, that a Christian (perhaps Byzantine) hermit lived there during the time of the Sassanid emperor Shapur II (c. 379). J. M. Unvala wrote that "The fortress of Doura-Eropos is mentioned by ancient authors like Polybius, Isidore of Kharax, Lucian, Ptolemaeus, Ammianus Marcellinus, Zosimus the Cosmographer of Ravenna. It is also mentioned in the Acts of the Syrian Martyr Mar Mu'ain, who lived in the time of Shapur II as follows: men madabra da doura "from the fortress of Doura"; madinta hada xarabta metkaria doura "the ruined city called Doura". Sebastian P. Brock describes the story of Mu'Ain as "The History of Ma'in of Sinjar, a general under Shapur II (309–79) who converted to Christianity and suffered as a confessor". He quotes Jean Maurice Fiey regarding the dating and place, and notes that "Dura is specifically described as being 'ruined'":

Fiey is more plausible in his suggestion that the History was written at a monastery that had grown up on the site of Mar Ma'in's cell at Shadba (=Shadwa, Shadbo), 6 miles from Europos, and on the basis of this he is able to give c. 636, the end of Byzantine rule in that area, as the terminus ante quem, since the author is clearly writing at a time when the Byzantine emperor controlled the area.

Another piece of evidence is a single coin, of the Roman emperor Constantius II, that indicates some activity in the 4th century or later. A Yale–French expedition also found seven lamps dating from fifth century. Because of these finds, historians concluded that the city wasn't abandoned and that there is "firm evidence that not only did activity continue at Dura—even if it was only sporadic and cannot confidently be associated with permanent settlement—but that contact with the Mediterranean, though certainly even more sporadic, continued as well."

== Inhabitants, languages and texts ==
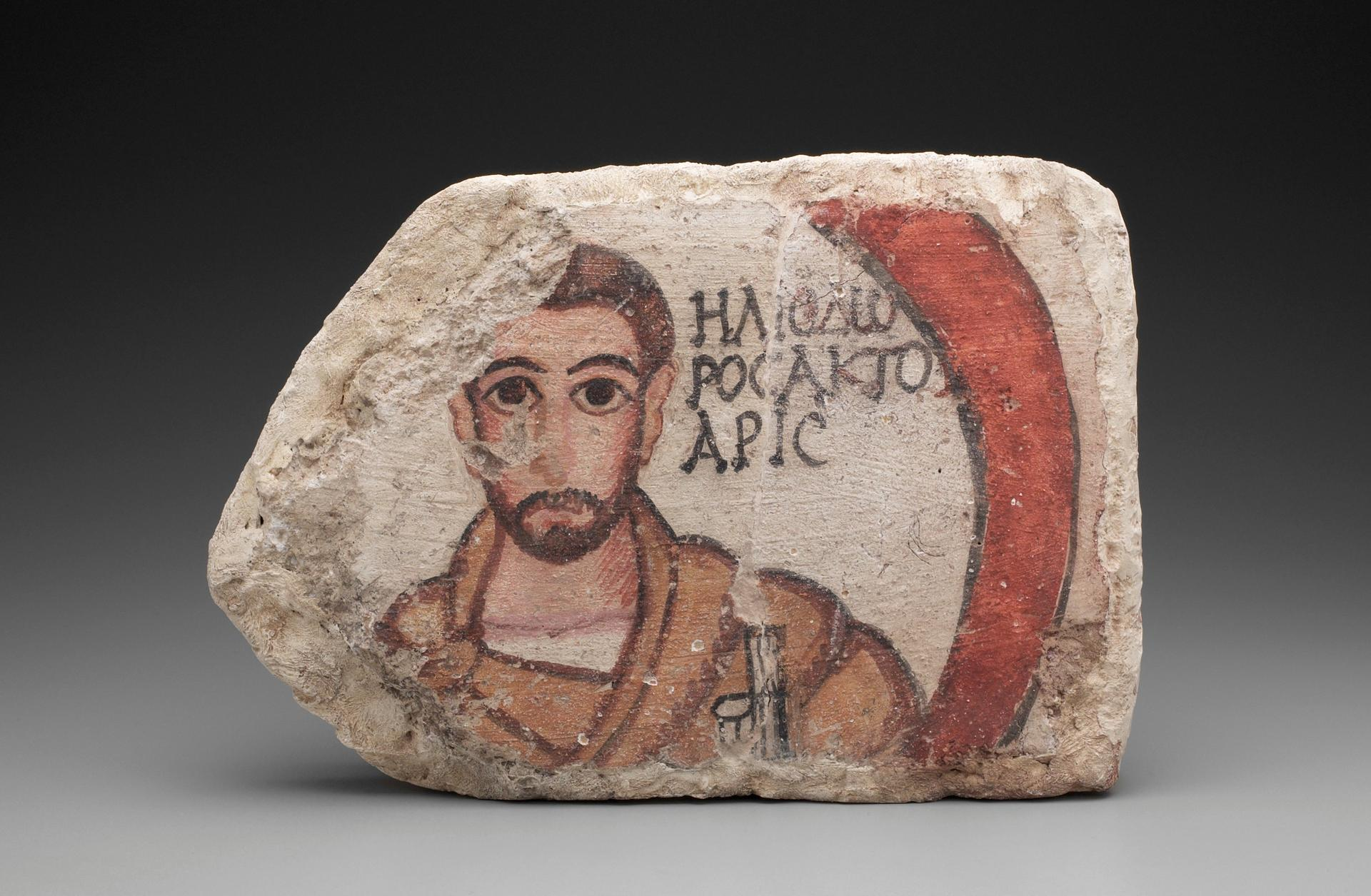
The tile from the ceiling of a House of Scribes that bears a Greek inscription that identifies the man by name, Heliodoros, and occupation, actuarius. The style and technique of the figure—the frontal pose, large eyes, subtle shading, and earth-toned pigments—recall other painted decoration in the city's buildings.

Dura-Europos was a cosmopolitan society, ruled by a tolerant Macedonian aristocracy descended from the original settlers. In the course of its excavation, over a hundred parchment and papyrus fragments, and many inscriptions, have revealed texts in Greek and Latin (the latter including a sator square), Palmyrene, Hebrew, Hatrian, Safaitic (proto-Arabic dialect), Pahlavi, Parthian, and Middle-Persian. In such a multicultural city, languages used by people didn't tell of their ethnicity.

Dura-Europos was founded by Greek settlers. So, it is not surprising that the vast majority of the inscriptions are in Greek, and about 800 Greek texts are known so far. These are dedicatory inscriptions, graffiti, and documents on papyrus and parchment. Greek was primarily the language of business and seems to have gained in importance, especially after the Roman occupation. It is believed that the upper class of the city, in particular, was still Greek in Parthian times. Palmyric is known, with certainty, from various inscriptions on monuments from 33 BC. It is believed that a small number of Palmyric traders lived in the city, and in Roman times there were also soldiers from Palmyra. Parthian is not well attested to, and the few Parthian inscriptions seem to date to Roman times. Middle Persian is attested primarily by two parchments and numerous graffiti in the synagogue. The texts must date from the short time when the city was ruled by the Sasanids.

Historian George Kilpatrick described the linguistic diversity as follows (from examples of graffiti from the synagogue):

Apart from a liturgical text written in Hebrew (on a parchment), the available textual sources from the synagogue consist of inscriptions and graffiti, which are more or less evenly divided in Aramaic (22), Greek (19) and Persian (12 Middle Persian, 'Pārsīk', and 3 Parthian, 'Pahlavīk'). [...] Most of the Persian ones were written on the wall paintings themselves and record appraisal on the part of visitors from elsewhere. Their presence can be explained by assuming that Mesopotamian Jews had sent someone "like a consular representative nowadays" to the Euphrates stronghold, in order to approve of the frescos.

Because of the dry desert climate, numerous documents on papyrus and parchment have been preserved, materials that otherwise would have little chance of surviving for millennia. The documents were found under the brick ramp built against the western wall, where they were especially protected. In the Temple of Artemis Azzanathkona, documents of the Cohors XX Palmyrenorum, which was stationed here, were found in a room that apparently served as an archive. The texts offer a unique view of the organization of the Roman army on the eastern border of the empire, and include a religious festival calendar, various letters—some of which are in Latin—daily reports on troop movements, and various lists of names.

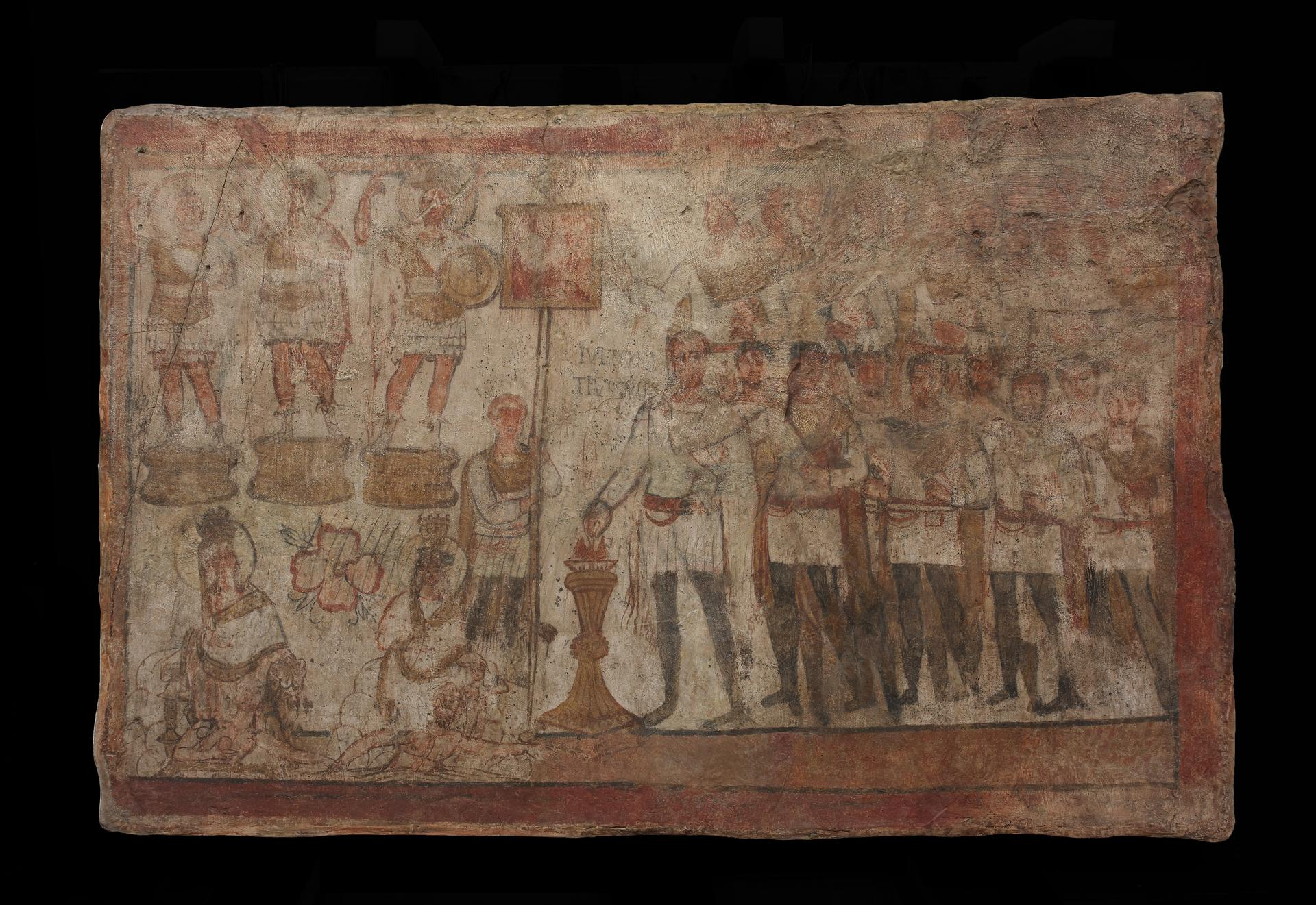
Julius Terentius Performing a sacrifice. Commissioned by the Roman tribune at Dura-Europos, Julius Terentius (depicted and identified here by Latin inscription), this painting mixes Greek, Roman, and Palmyrene elements, perhaps as a diplomatic gesture.

Although the documents found mainly regard administration (in Latin) and business (in Greek), some literary and religious texts were found in the city. Only a few documents can be dated with certainty to the time of Parthian rule. Only seven of them are definitely dated. They are written in Greek but use the Seleucid calendar. Among the literary texts there is a fragment by Herodotus and one by Appian. The Herodotus fragment comes from his 5th book and is written in extremely beautiful script. C. Bradford Welles describes the book as de luxe and dates the copy to the 2nd century AD. Dura parchment 10 (P. Dura 10), the fragment of a harmony of the Gospels, is particularly interesting. It is perhaps a fragment of Tatian's Diatessaron. There was also a prayer in Hebrew. The texts shed light on daily life in the city. In Parthian times, documents were dated from the Arsacian era and from the Seleucid era. Interesting is the appearance of women in the legal documents of the Parthian and Roman periods, which indicated that they acted independently and did not need a male advocate, as they did in the Mediterranean region.

Many Greek documents are in the Attic dialect and have few grammatical errors. Since most of the texts are legal documents, this shows that most of the writers were well educated in the Greek language. On the other hand, a letter dating from the third century that was sent by a person from the village of Ossa shows more deviations from the classic Attic. Still, there is no indication that any dialect of Greek peculiar to the city, a "Durene" dialect, developed.

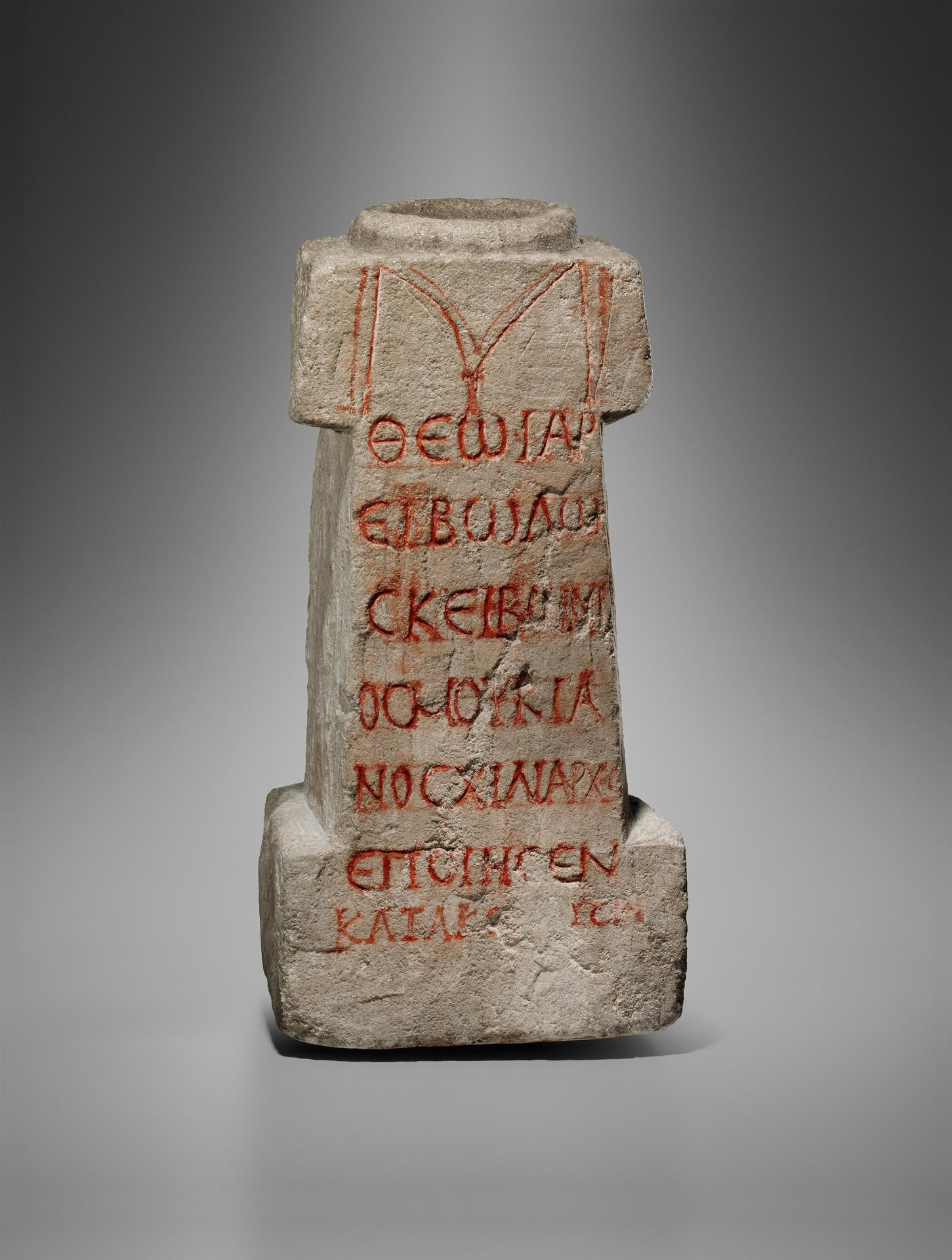
Altar of Yarhibol with Greek inscription by Scribonius Moucianus, a chiliarch.

The languages used by different people show how multicultural the city was. For example, on a ceiling tile of Heliodoros, an actuarius (an official responsible for the distribution of wages in the Roman military), there is a Greek inscription that identifies the man by name and occupation. The use of Greek to identify a Roman official is typical of the multicultural environment at Dura-Europos. Another example is an inscription that reads: "... brave in campaigns, mighty in wars, dead..." These words are part of the epitaph of Julius Terentius, tribune of the twentieth Palmyrene cohort.

As historian Jennifer Baird wrote, Julius is known better than most of the Roman soldiers who were stationed at Dura, as he is recorded in papyri from the military archives as well as from a painting, depicting him with his men. (Note: The painting shows Julius Terentius performing an official sacrifice in front of a military standard, Terentius stands with his men. Although in Roman military attire, these soldiers are Palmyrenes; one of them (Themes, son of Mokimos) is identified in Greek as a priest. The sacrifice, a burning of incense, was an act of worship common in both Near Eastern and Roman sanctuaries. Here it takes place in the presence of divinities, all nimbate. The Tychai of Dura and Palmyra are shown in Hellenistic style incorporating some Near Eastern features. Three male statues of deities enigmatically combine Roman cuirasses and Palmyrene attributes (such as the peaked helmet). Their lack of identifying labels creates ambiguity as to whether they represent Palmyrene gods or deified Roman emperors. This may have been done intentionally, to appeal to viewers of different backgrounds.) His Greek funerary inscription was found in a house near the centre of the city, apparently incomplete—as can be seen, the last section was not carved, but the painted guiding lines are preserved. Whether his wife, Aurelia Arria, or the person she commissioned to create this, did not themselves survive to complete the memorial, we do not know. While it is incomplete, this shows a Roman tribune commemorated with a Greek inscription by his wife. Also, it is virtually unique at Dura, where no tradition of funerary commemoration was found: no funerary inscriptions, and, unlike its more famous Syrian neighbour Palmyra, no funerary portraits. One more interesting example is an altar of the local god Yarhibol. On it there is an inscription in Greek: "[For] the god Yarhibol, Scribonius Moucianus, chiliarch, made this as commanded." It is notable because it shows that a man who bears a Latin name, Scribonius Moucianus, and holding a Greek-titled office in the Roman army, worshipped a local deity and offered his dedication in Greek.

Some documents that were found are evidence of a local tradition of people having several names: for example, a Greek one and a Semitic (Note: Aramaic and Arabic) or a Persian one. One of the examples is Dura parchment 19 (P. Dura 19) (dating from first century AD), which records the division of a house inherited by four brothers from their father. As Baird wrote:

The father is recorded as having the Greek name Polemocrates (his own father and grandfather also bearing the names Demetrius and Polemocrates, respectively), and amongst the younger Polemocrates' sons, all had both Greek and Aramaic names, for instance Demetrius, also known as Nabusamus. The document records the concern with noting patrilineal descent – descent along the male line – and a pattern of sons taking the Greek name of their grandfathers. They are described as Europaioi, 'of Europos', a designation of place which [...] is generally assumed to indicate citizen status.

Fragments of parchment scrolls with Hebrew texts have also been unearthed; they resisted meaningful translation until J.L. Teicher pointed out that they were Christian Eucharistic prayers, so closely connected with the prayers in Didache that he was able to fill lacunae in the light of the Didache text.

In 1933, among fragments of text recovered from the town dump outside the Palmyrene Gate, a fragmentary text was unearthed from an unknown Greek harmony of the gospel account—comparable to Tatian's Diatessaron, but independent of it.

== Religious life ==
John Noble Wilford compared the ancient city with modern New York:

New Yorkers would have felt at home in the grid pattern of streets, where merchants lived, scribes wrote and Jews worshiped in the same block, not far from a Christian house-church as well as shrines to Greek and Palmyrene deities. Scholars said the different religious groups seemed to maintain their distinct identities.

=== Greco-Roman, Palmyrene, and local cults ===
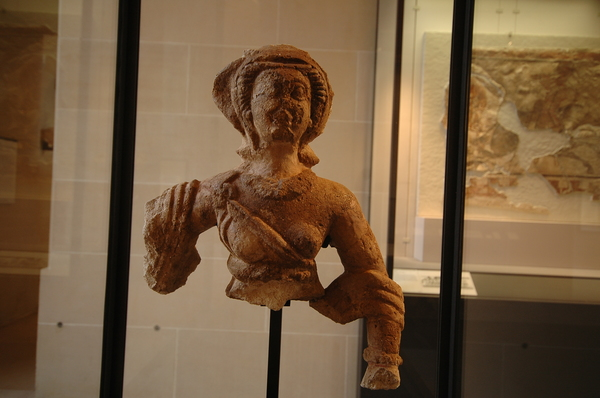
Bust of a woman, probably Artemis, from the Temple of Artemis.

The Temple of Artemis Nanaïa was perhaps the oldest temple in the city. In the Seleucid period there was a temenos (a walled, sacred area) with a Doric colonnade and an altar in the middle. At the end of the second century BC it burned down. A naiskos (small temple) was built in its stead, but it was never finished. In the middle of the first century BC the temple was rebuilt: a courtyard complex was created, in the middle of which stood a new temple, with an anteroom and three-aisled cella. The temple was rebuilt several times before the city fell. A statue, found in its ruins, represents a woman's figure, probably Artemis, dressed in hunting garb. Only the upper part was found, both arms having been broken off. Historian Susan B. Downey writes that the statue has "an Amazonian aspect by the fact that one breast is left bare". There is a crescent-shaped necklace on the statue, and a veil of unusual form.

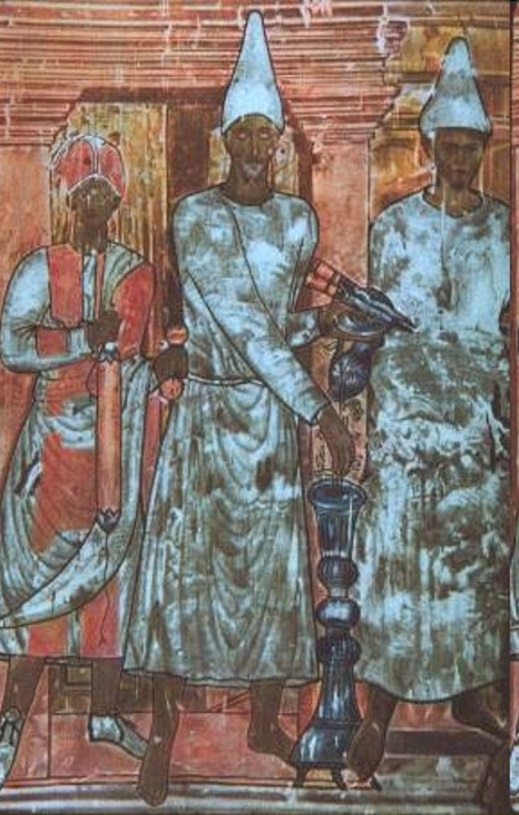
The sacrifice of Konon, wall painting in the Temple of Bel

There were at least three Palmyric temples in the city. The Temple of Bel (also known as the Temple of the Palmyric Gods) was built in one corner of the city wall, in the third century BC. Several construction phases can be distinguished in the building. The plan consisted of various rooms ranged around a courtyard; the actual temple stood to the north and was later marked by four columns. This temple was once richly decorated with wall paintings. There was also a shrine here, which probably contained the cult image. A small sanctuary of Bel, consisted of a single hall, was also found.

The Necropolis Temple was built in 33 BC and, according to the inscriptions, was dedicated to Baal and Yarhibol. The temple was just outside the city and probably was maintained until the city's abandonment. Although the temple was located in the city's necropolis, it was built prior; and the cult there had no connection to the cemetery. The temple could have been a first port of call for caravans coming from Palmyra. A cistern next to the temple may have served to water pack animals. Remains of wall paintings were found in the temple. Three inscriptions are particularly important. The oldest of them, written in Palmyric, dates from 33 BC (year 279 of the Seleucid era) It is the oldest known inscription at Dura-Europos; and when it was found and published in 1935, it was the oldest known Palmyric inscription anywhere. The names of the founders of the temple are known: Zabdibol, son of Ba'yashu, and Maliku, son of Ramu. Zabdibol came from the Bene Gaddibol clan, Maliku from that of the Bene Komare. The donors were obviously Palmyrians who lived in Dura-Europos. It is noteworthy that the donors come from two different clans. In inscriptions at Palmyra, when different donors are named together, they come from the same clan. The Bene Gaddibol clan is well documented in Palmyra, where belonging to a clan was an important part of one's identity. In Dura-Europos clan membership obviously lost its meaning, and two people from different clans could appear together in inscriptions. In Dura-Europos, their identity was their common Palmyrene origin.

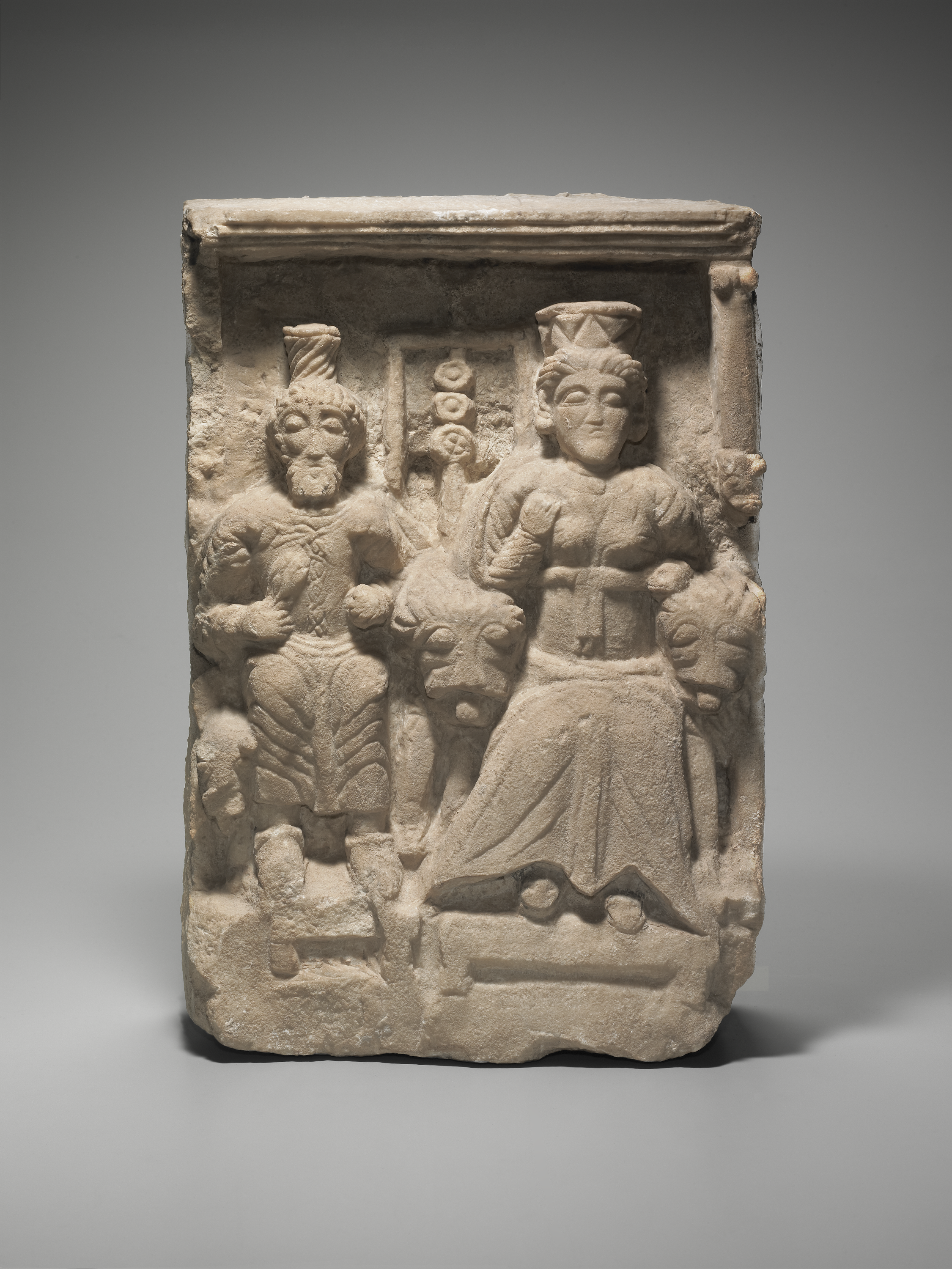
Relief from the Temple of Atargatis

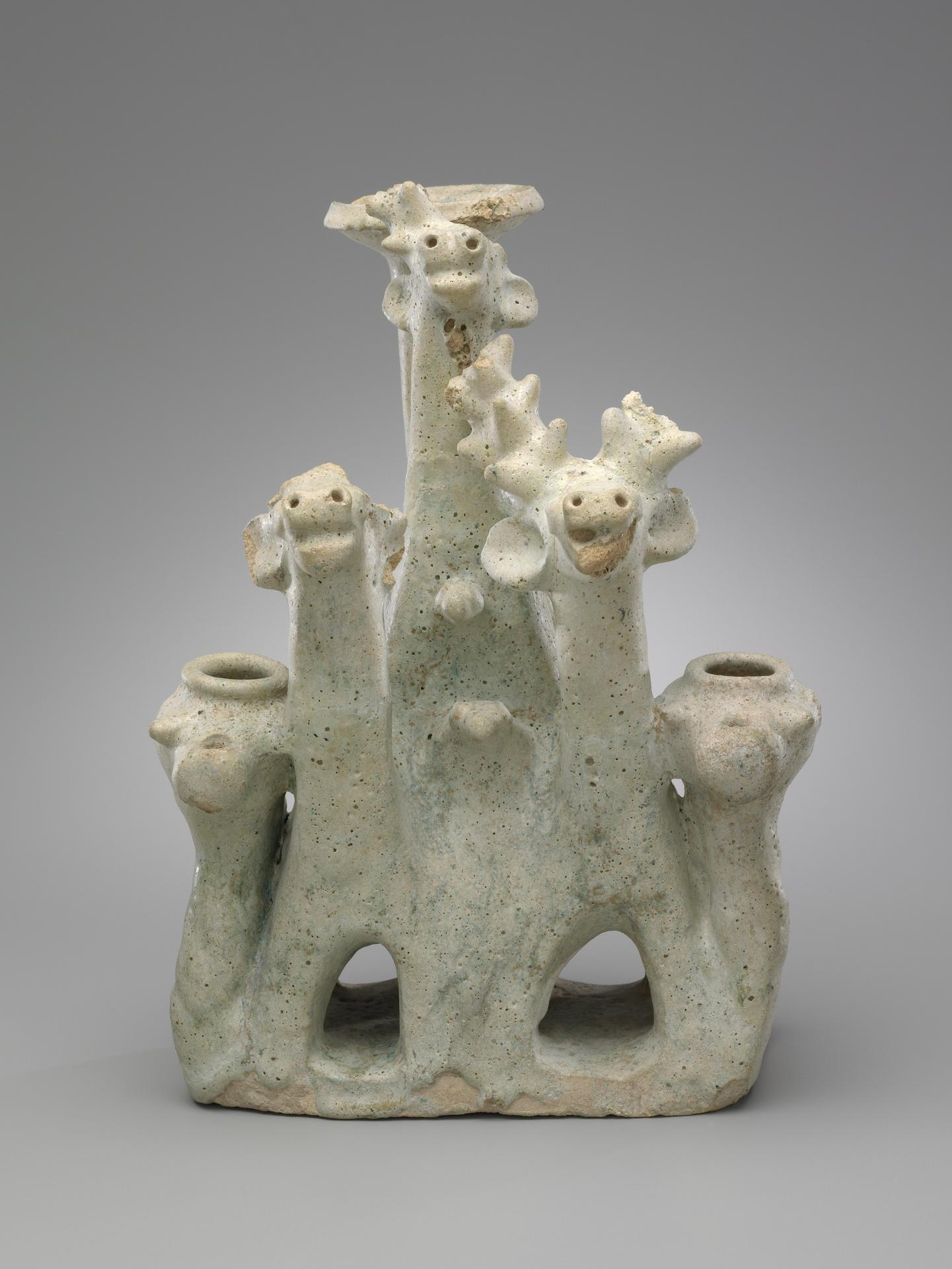
Thymiaterion (incense altar) from the Cistern at the Temple of Atargatis. It depicts a group of deer, Atargatis sacred animals.

The Temple of Atargatis, which is south of the centre of the city (referred to by the excavators as the agora) and which occupies the northern part of H2 Block, was built on roughly the same principle. The temple complex had a large courtyard in the middle, a monumental entrance, and a sanctuary with a pronaos (portico) in front and three naoi (chambers) at the back. There were numerous small rooms around the courtyard, some of which were probably shrines that were consecrated to various deities. A relief on the sanctuary of the temple shows the goddess Atargatis, with a lion on either side of her, and her husband Hadad nearby. A cult standard is depicted between the two deities. Atargatis was the mother of Adonis; Hadad and Adonis could also be worshipped here. Various inscriptions by ancient visitors tell of the people who visited the sanctuary. That the temple was frequented by people from Hatra is shown by a visitor's inscription, in Hatran (an Aramaic language), that is addressed to the god of the city of Hatra named Šamaš. Otherwise, a striking number of inscriptions in the temple, some of which were scratched into the walls, were made by women. There is an inscription from the first half of the first century AD that mentions the consecration of a chapel. A number of other inscriptions date from 69 AD. Some of the women named in the inscriptions appear to have come from the family of the governors of Dura-Europos. One woman was the granddaughter of the governor Lysias, another woman the wife of the governor Seleucus. In a wall of the temple there was a cuneiform tablet with old Babylonian script, which names the place as Da-wa-ra, which may be an old name for Dura.

In the southeast part of the site, which was separated from the rest of the city by a wadi, apparently stood an acropolis typical of a Greek city. However, hardly anything has survived from the temples of that time.

The Temple of Zeus Theos was built in the second century AD and was among the most important sanctuaries of the city. The building was in the centre of the city. It had an area of around 37 square metres (400 sq ft) and occupied half an insula. The building had a monumental courtyard and in it a large naos. The cult figure of the god was depicted on the back wall. He stood next to a chariot and was crowned by two Nikes. On the side walls of the hall are the pictures of the donors, and their family members, who financed this temple.

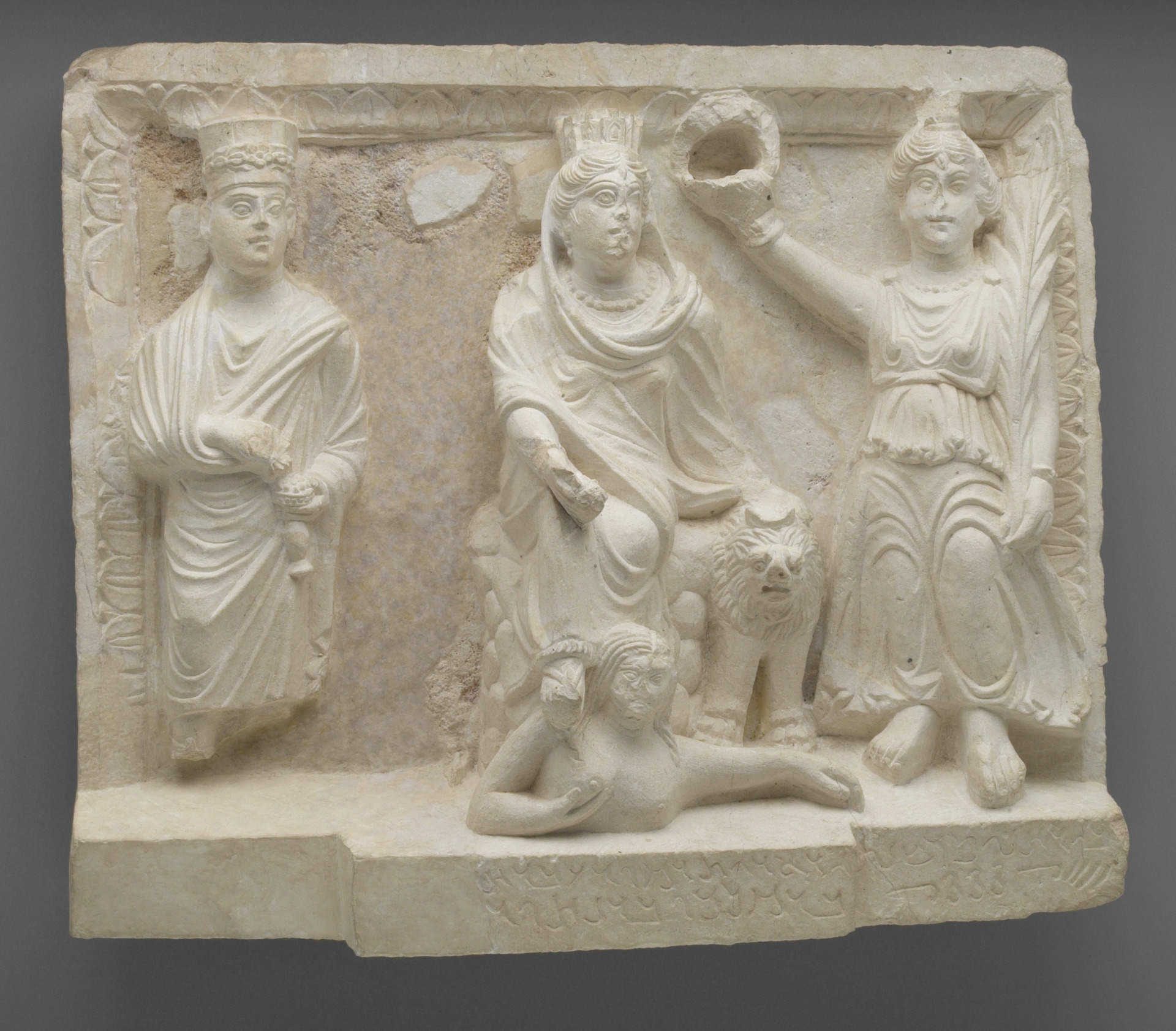
The female protective deity of Palmyra from the Temple of the Gadde

The Temple of the Gadde was a double temple dedicated to the patron deities (gaddē) of the city and of Palmyra. The building is located near the agora. The temple was built in the last years of Parthian rule. A propylaeon (monumental gateway) led into a courtyard; opposite the gateway was the cella with other rooms. On the right side, a hall with benches on the walls led to another courtyard, with another cella there. The exact age of the temple complex is unknown. It was expanded several times over time. Two consecration reliefs were found in the temple. One of them shows the female protective deity of Palmyra in a guise modelled on the Tyche of Antioch. She sits between two figures, wearing a mural crown and Greek clothing. On her left is the dedicator of the relief, depicted as a priest, and on her right a Nike. The other depicts the male patron deity of Dura-Europos, bearded and wearing a tunic. It is very likely a depiction of Zeus Megistos. To his right is Seleukos Nikator, on the left is the one consecrating the relief. The city was founded by Seleukos Nikator, so the ruler enjoyed a special veneration here. According to an inscription, the reliefs were dedicated to "The god, Gad of Dura; made by Hairan bar Maliku Nasor, in the month of Nisan, year 470 [159 AD]." The cella also contained a relief that depicted the Semitic god Yarhibol. An inscription records "Bani Mitha, the archers" as the donors.

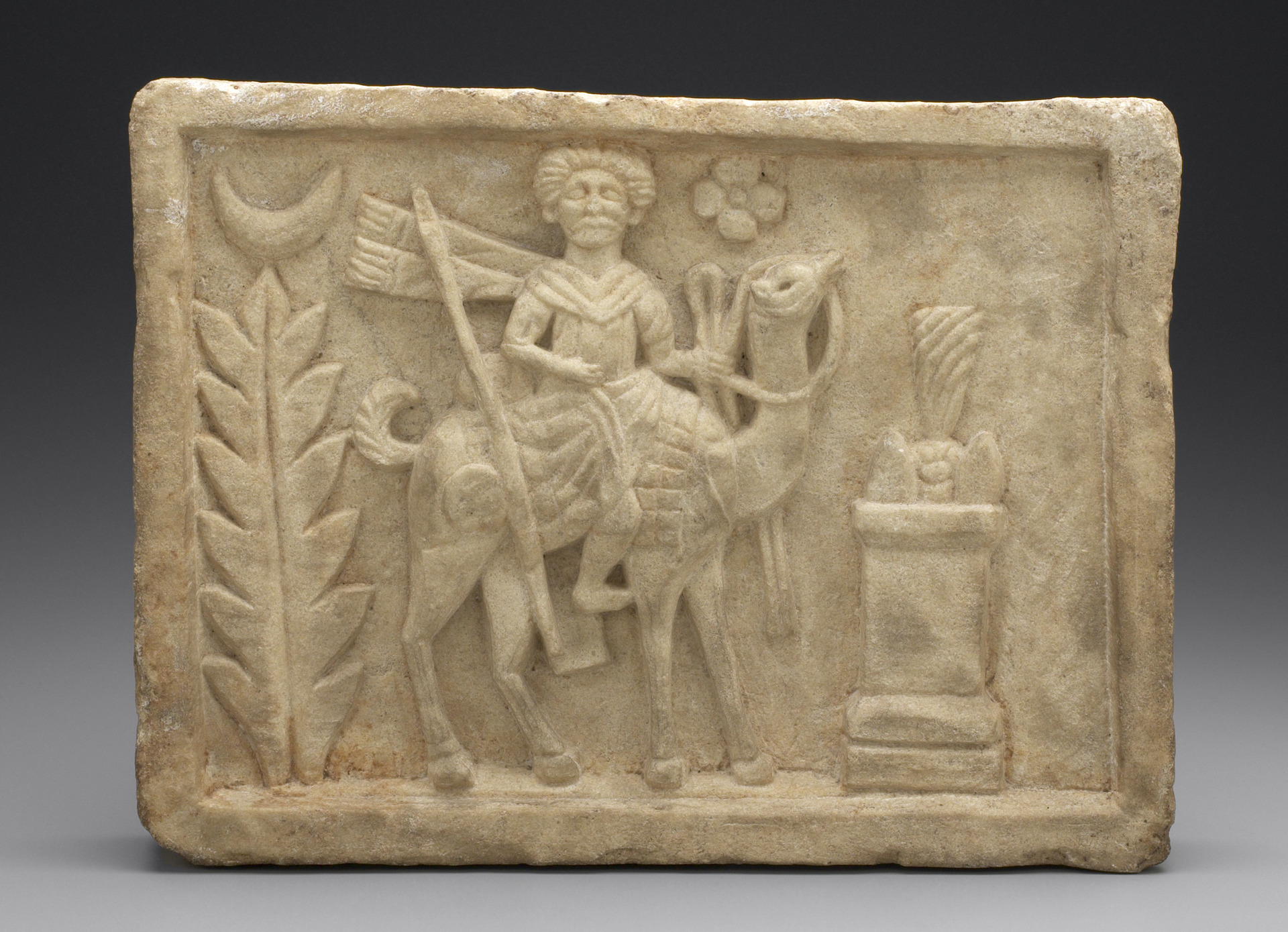
Relief with the god Arsu, from the Temple of Adonis

The Temple of Adonis was also built in Parthian times. It is also a temple complex that is grouped around a courtyard. The actual temple was located to the south and consisted of a pronaos and the naos. Wall paintings, which were discovered in a fragmentary state, depicted a statue and a family making an offering to the god on a fire altar at left. The scene has been reconstructed. In the temple complex there was also another relief, which shows the god Arsu on a camel. The inscription under the figure reads: "Oga the sculptor has made (this to) 'Arsu the camel-rider', for the life of his son".

The Temple of Artemis Azzanathkona was on the north side of the city and had two naoi. The temple has stood here since at least 13 AD. In Roman times, the complex was partly integrated into the military camp, although the cult worship was continued. The archive of the Cohors XX Palmyrenorum was found in one room of the temple. An inscription from 161 AD said that the temple was dedicated to Artemis Azzanathkona. Her followers believed in a "syncretized combination" of a Greek goddess Artemis and local Syrian deity Azzanathkona (Atargatis).

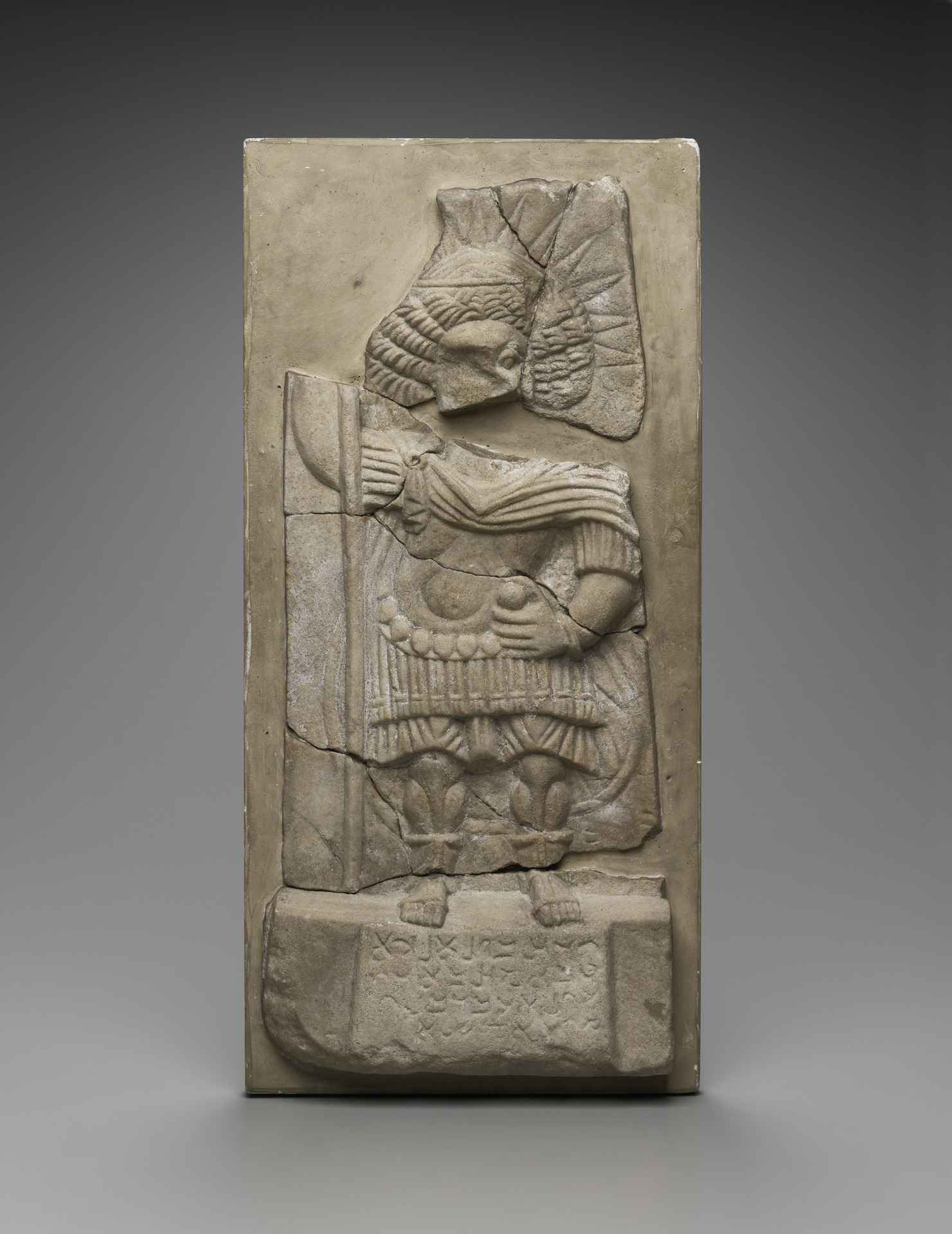
Relief with figure of Iarhibol from Dolicheneum

The Dolicheneum was a temple where Jupiter Dolichenus and the god called Zeus Helios Mithras Turmasgade may have been worshiped. The temple entrance was in the south part. The building had a columned courtyard with two altars; behind it were two cellae. The temple was therefore dedicated to two deities. Various rooms were arranged around the courtyard, some of them had benches along the walls. Remnants of wall paintings were also found in one room. Various inscriptions were discovered in and around the temple. One cella was dedicated to the little-known god Turmasgade. The second cella was for Jupiter Dolichenus, several dedications to whom were found in the temple. Another room was dedicated to an unnamed goddess, probably Juno Dolichena. The temple was built by units of the Roman army around 211 AD, and was in use until 256 AD, mainly by Roman soldiers stationed in the city. Soldiers left several inscriptions that mention "centurio princeps of a vexillation of IV (Scythia) and XVI Flavia Firma, a vexillation of Cohors II Paphlagonum with the titles 'Galliana Volusiana', a cohors equitata with the same titles, and Julius Julianus, of A.D. 251".

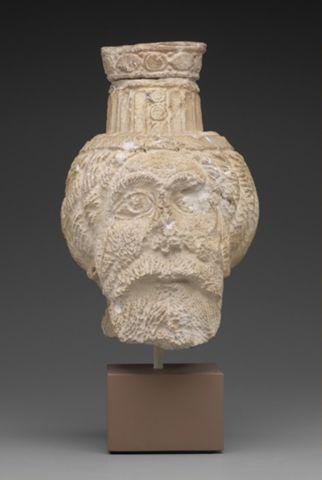
Head, perhaps of Zeus Megistos

The Temple of Zeus Megistos (second century AD) on the Acropolis probably replaced a Greek temple of Zeus Olympius. The assignment of the temple to Zeus Megistos is based only on a dedicatory inscription, according to which parts of the building were made by Seleucus, Strategos (strategos kai epistates) of the city, rebuilt and consecrated to the god. The inscription dates to 169/170 AD and tells of numerous construction works on the temple, perhaps after it was destroyed by an earthquake. Probably then the building received its final form. The founder, Seleukos, was practically a governor in Dura-Europos and belonged to a Greek family who held this office for several generations. The governor's family's house was right next to the temple. Other members of the governor's family, such as Lysias, are also mentioned in inscriptions, but no titles are mentioned, so there is a possibility that these are other people of the same name who did not belong to the governor's family.

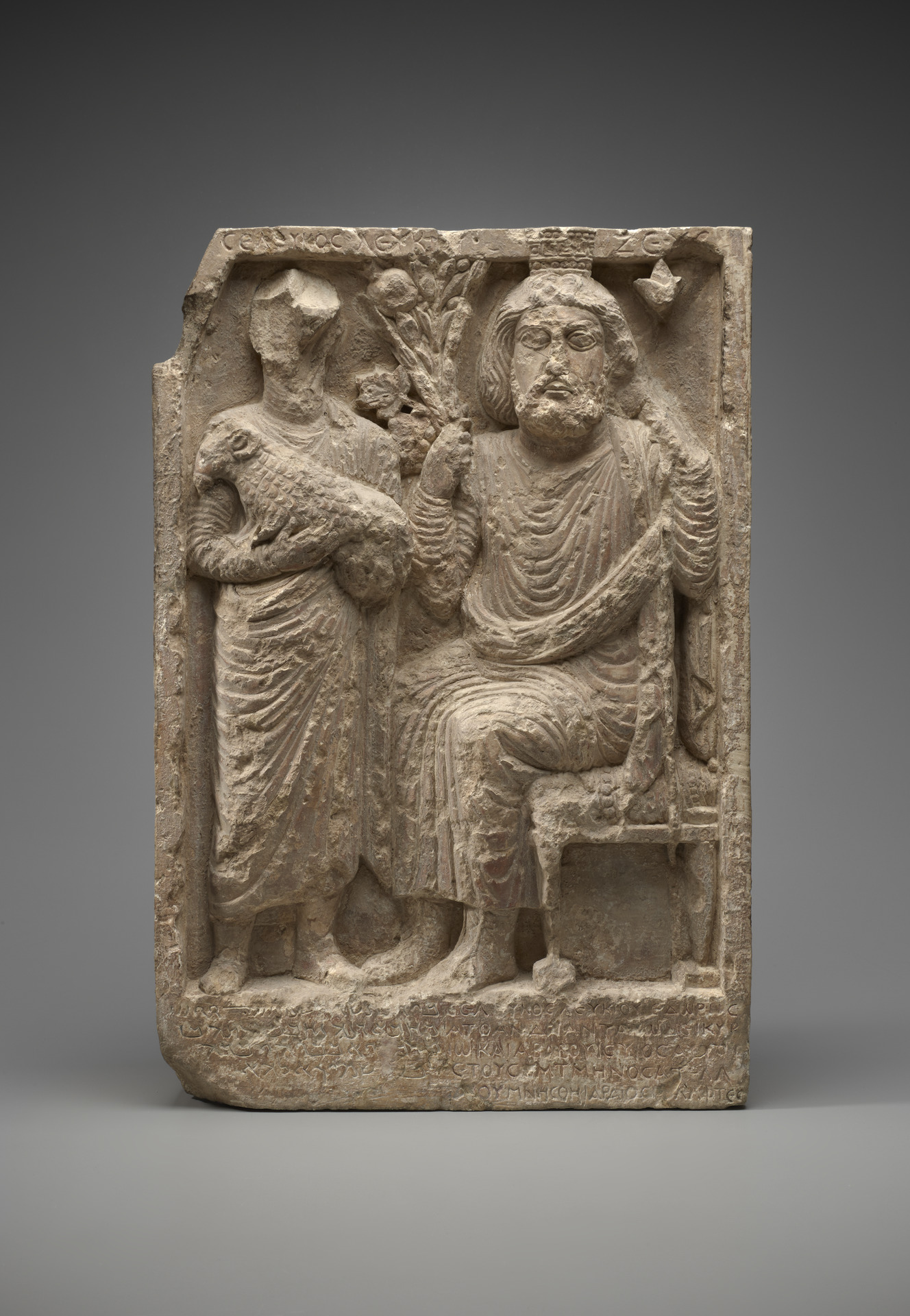
The stele from the Temple of Zeus Kyrios

The Temple of Zeus Kyrios was a small sanctuary built against the city wall. A stele was found in the sanctuary, with either a cult image or a dedicatory relief on it. The stele shows Zeus seated on the right and a donor who appears to be a Palmyrene man. The stele has a Palmyrene language inscription that states that it was erected by Baratheh, son of Luke and his son Abubuhi in 31 AD. The god is named as Baalshamin. A Greek inscription also gives the name of the donor as Seleukos, son of Luke, and names the god as Zeus. A further Greek inscription on the stele again names Seleukos, gives the date, and refers to the god as Zeus Kyrios.

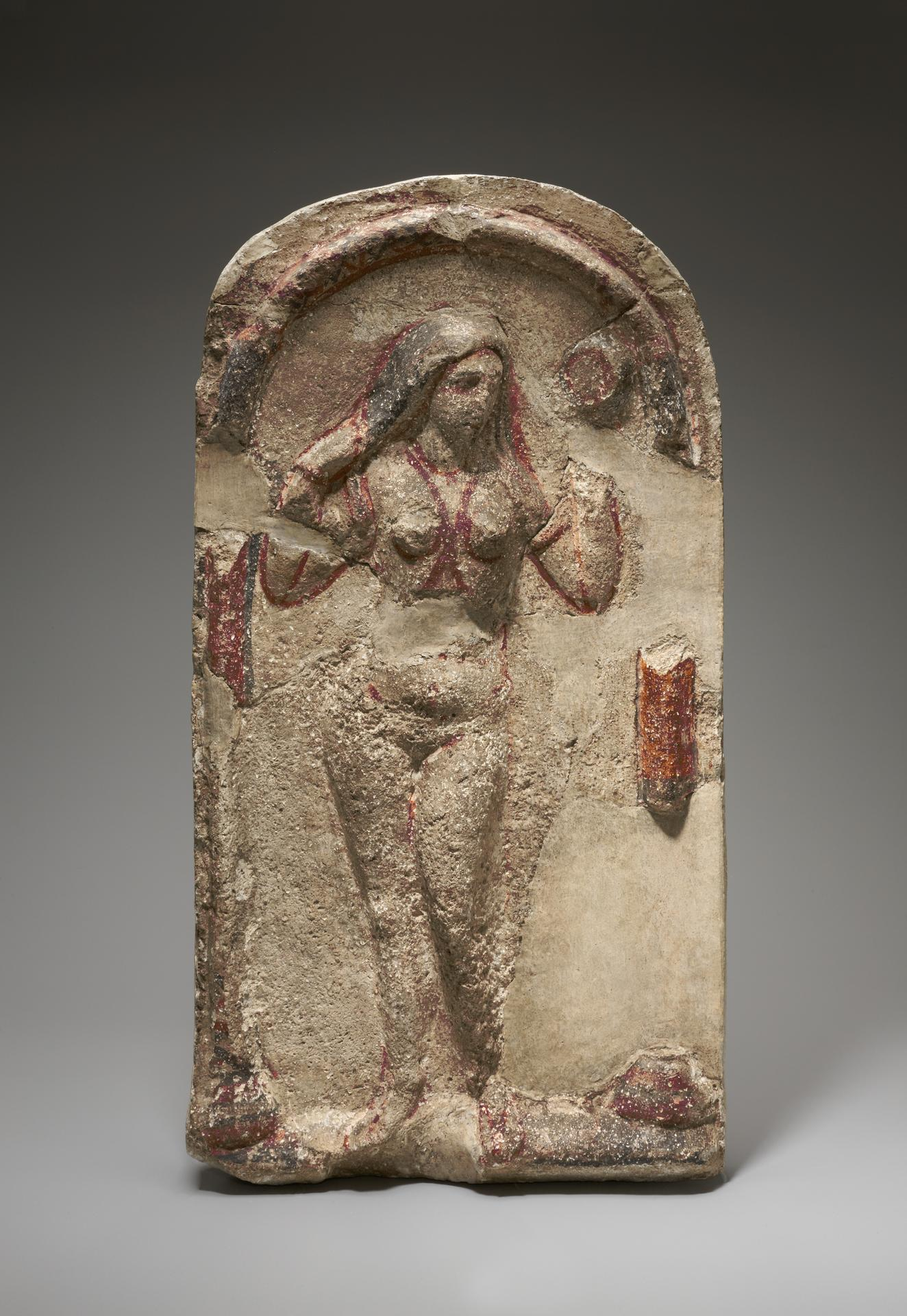
Relief of Aphrodite in a niche

Multiple images of Greco-Roman deities were also found. Among them are Nemesis, Nike, and Aphrodite. One of the reliefs of Aphrodite was found in a private house, and is one of three such reliefs that were made in the same mold. The composition is derived from Hellenistic art, but the goddess's attributes—her bracelets, anklets, breast ornaments, and lack of modesty—is similar to the images of nude Near Eastern fertility goddesses. Perhaps it can explain her popularity at Dura-Europos. The relief is dated to 200–256 AD. The house where the relief was found is close to the military quarter and may have been a brothel. Two other nearly identical and one fragmentary versions of this relief were excavated across the site. One of the additional Aphrodite reliefs was found at what is called the House of Priests, which led to speculation about women's roles in the domestic cult. A marble statue of Aphrodite Urania was found in the Temple of Artemis; it is thought to have been imported to Dura-Europos. Wall paintings of Aphrodite and Cupid were found in the House of Scribes.

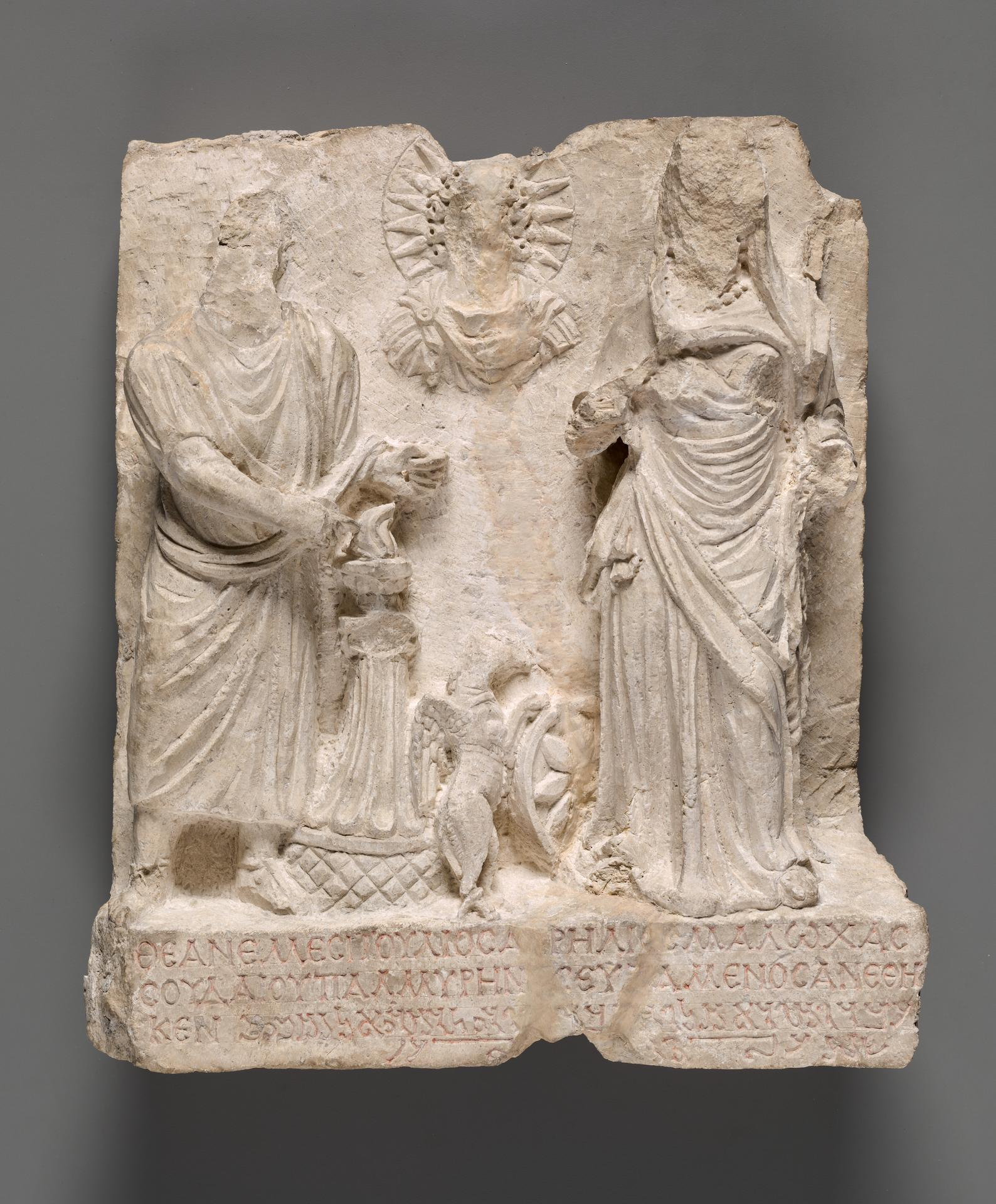
Relief of the Nemesis

A relief of the goddess Nemesis was described as: "Marble relief of the goddess Nemesis (right) receiving a burnt offering by a priest named Julius Aurelius Malochus. The relief includes a 'floating' bust with a radiant aura around the bust. One interpretation is that the bust symbolizes the cosmic power of the goddess. At the feet of the goddess is a wheel (a typical symbol associated with the goddess) and a griffin." As noted by Dirven, the image of Nemesis here differs from those in Palmyra and Greece. Here she is associated with a sun god; in Palmyra she was most likely associated with the goddess Allat, who was worshipped in sanctuaries together with the sun god Shamash. Dirven concludes that "the popularity of solar deities among the military probably enforced this Palmyrene association of Nemesis-Allat with the sun god and resulted in the presence of the sun god in the Durene relief".

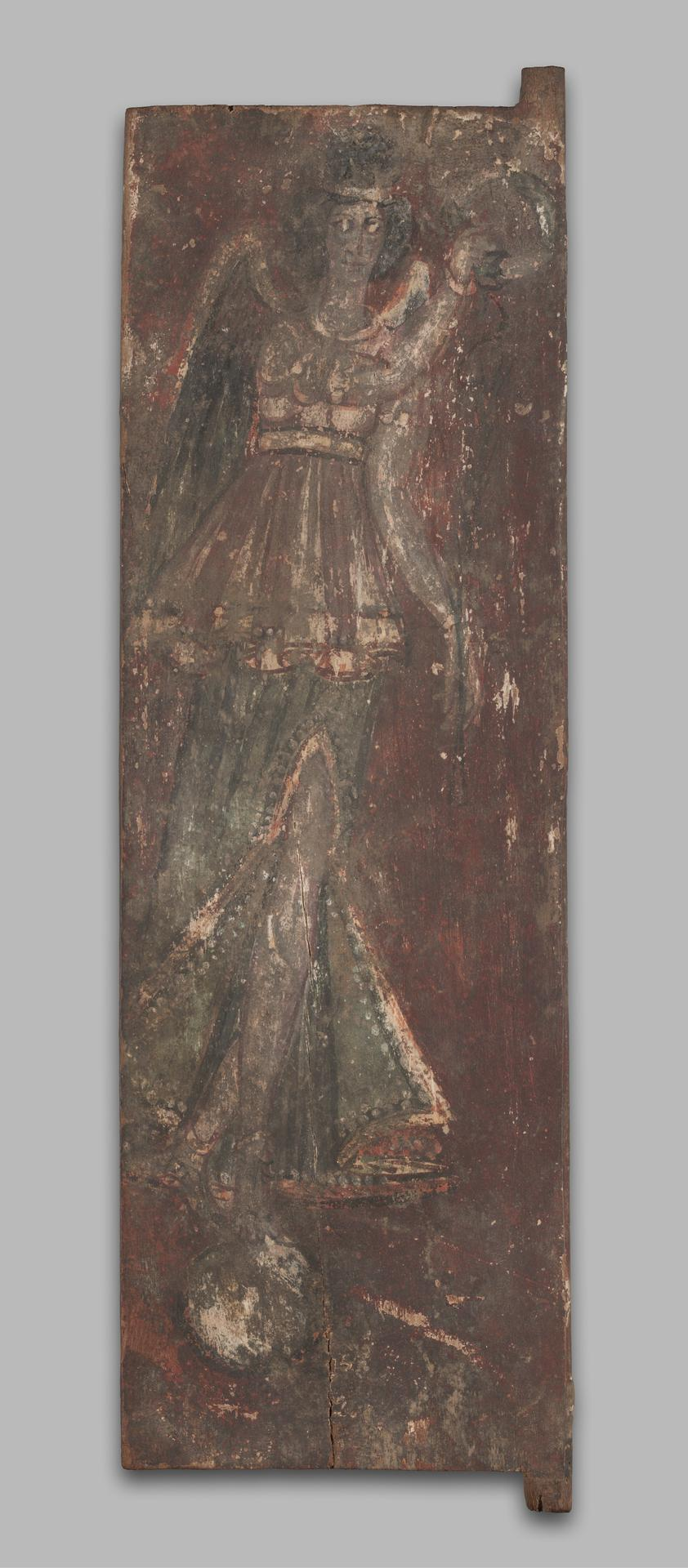
Nike or Winged Goddess of Victory

The dedication reads:

Θεᾷ Νεμέσι Ιούλιος Αὐρήλιος Μαλωχὰς
Σουδαίου Παλμυρηνὸς εὐξάμενος ἀνέθηκεν

Translation: Julius Aurelius Malochas, son of Soudaios, Palmyrene, set this up in gratitude to the goddess Nemesis.

'bd wmwd' mlwk' br šwdy tdmry' lnmsys šnt 556

Translation: Maloka son of Shudai, Palmyrene, made (this), and with gratitude, for Nemesis. The year 556 (AD 244–245).

The goddess of victory, Nike, was also popular in Dura-Europos, especially with the military, who viewed her as "an active divine force influencing human affairs and bringing military success. One of the paintings of Nike was found in an enclosed wooden shrine in the Palmyrene Gate. That painting may have contained a depiction of the emperor. It was dedicated to the goddess by soldiers on behalf of their commander and his family.

=== Synagogue ===
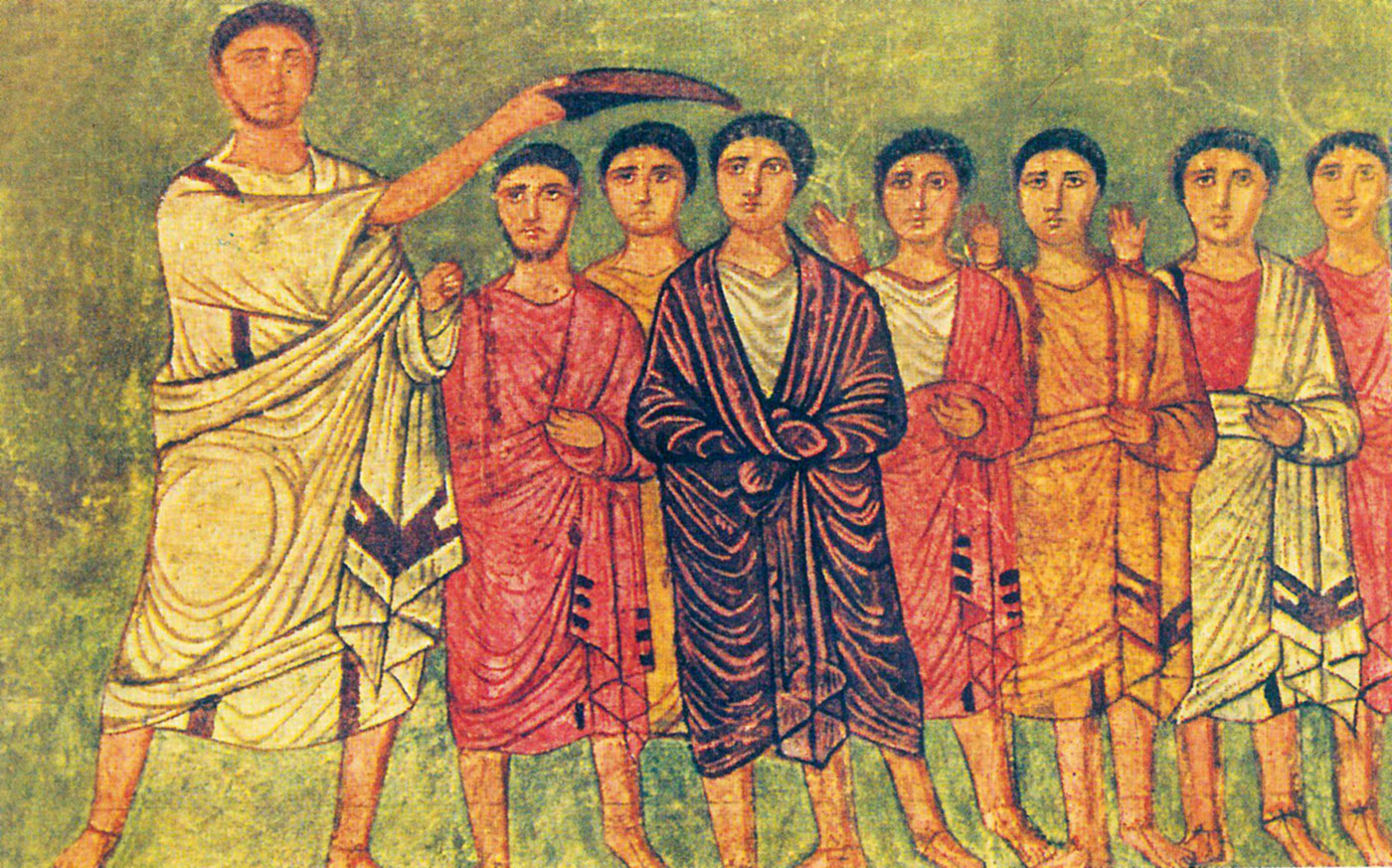
David anointed by Samuel, painting from the synagogue

The Jewish synagogue, located by the western wall between towers 18 and 19, the last phase of which was dated by an Aramaic inscription to 244, is the best preserved of the many ancient synagogues of that era that have been uncovered by archaeologists. It was well preserved due to having been infilled with earth to strengthen the city's fortifications against a Sasanian assault in 256. It was uncovered in 1932 by Clark Hopkins, who found that it contains a forecourt and house of assembly with frescoed walls depicting people and animals, and a Torah shrine in the western wall facing Jerusalem.

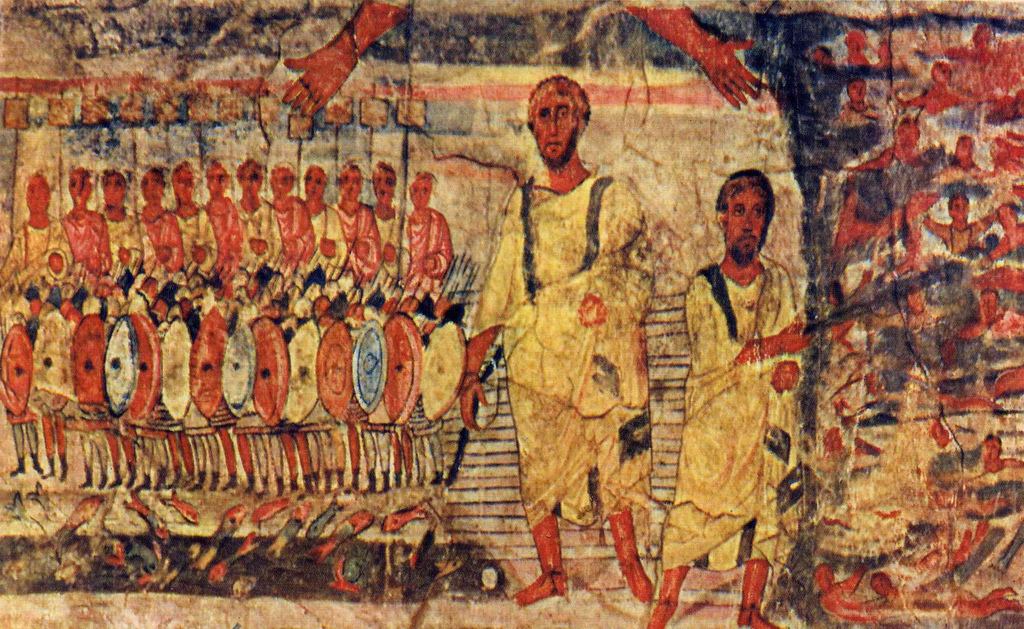
Israelites crossing the Red Sea

The discovery of the wall paintings in the assembly hall of the synagogue caused a tremendous sensation, as it is the largest cycle of paintings that has survived from antiquity. The find is important for religious history, as the Jewish communities there were generally judged to be hostile to images. The paintings are preserved at Damascus.

=== House church ===
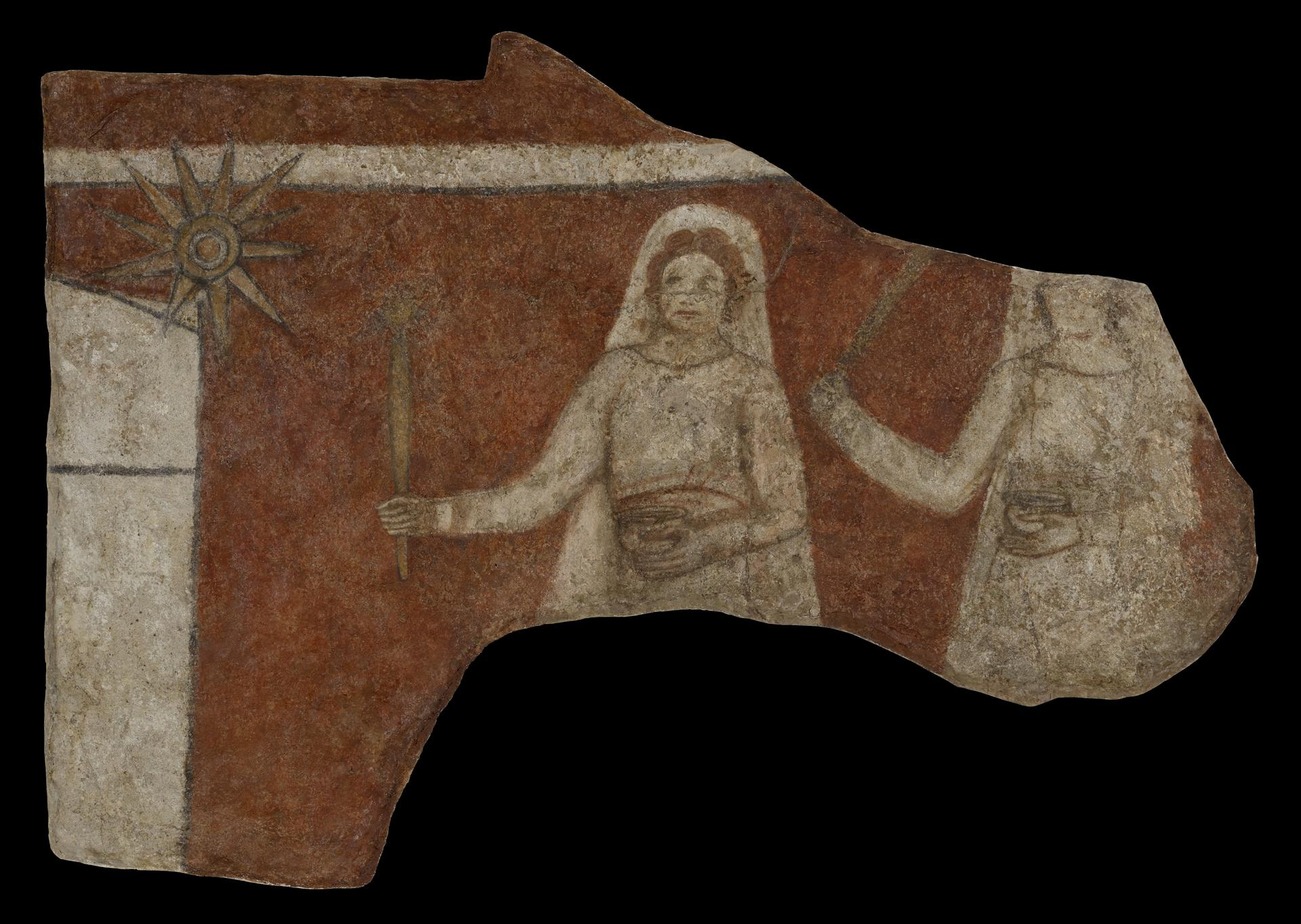
Procession of women, painting from the house church

The Dura-Europos house church, the earliest house church yet discovered, is near the 17th tower and was preserved by the same defensive fill that saved the synagogue. "Their evidently open and tolerated presence in the middle of a major Roman garrison town reveals that the history of the early Church was not simply a story of pagan persecution".

The building consists of a house conjoined to a separate hall-like room, which functioned as the meeting room for the church. Dating from 235 AD, the surviving frescoes of the baptistry room are probably the most ancient Christian paintings in existence. The "Good Shepherd", the "Healing of the paralytic", and "Christ and Peter walking on the water" are among the preserved paintings and are the earliest depictions of Jesus Christ ever found.

A much larger fresco depicts two women (and a third, mostly lost) approaching a large sarcophagus, i.e. probably the three Marys visiting Christ's tomb. There are also frescoes of Adam and Eve as well as David and Goliath. The frescoes clearly followed the Hellenistic Jewish iconographic tradition, but they are more crudely done than the paintings of the nearby synagogue.

=== Mithraeum ===
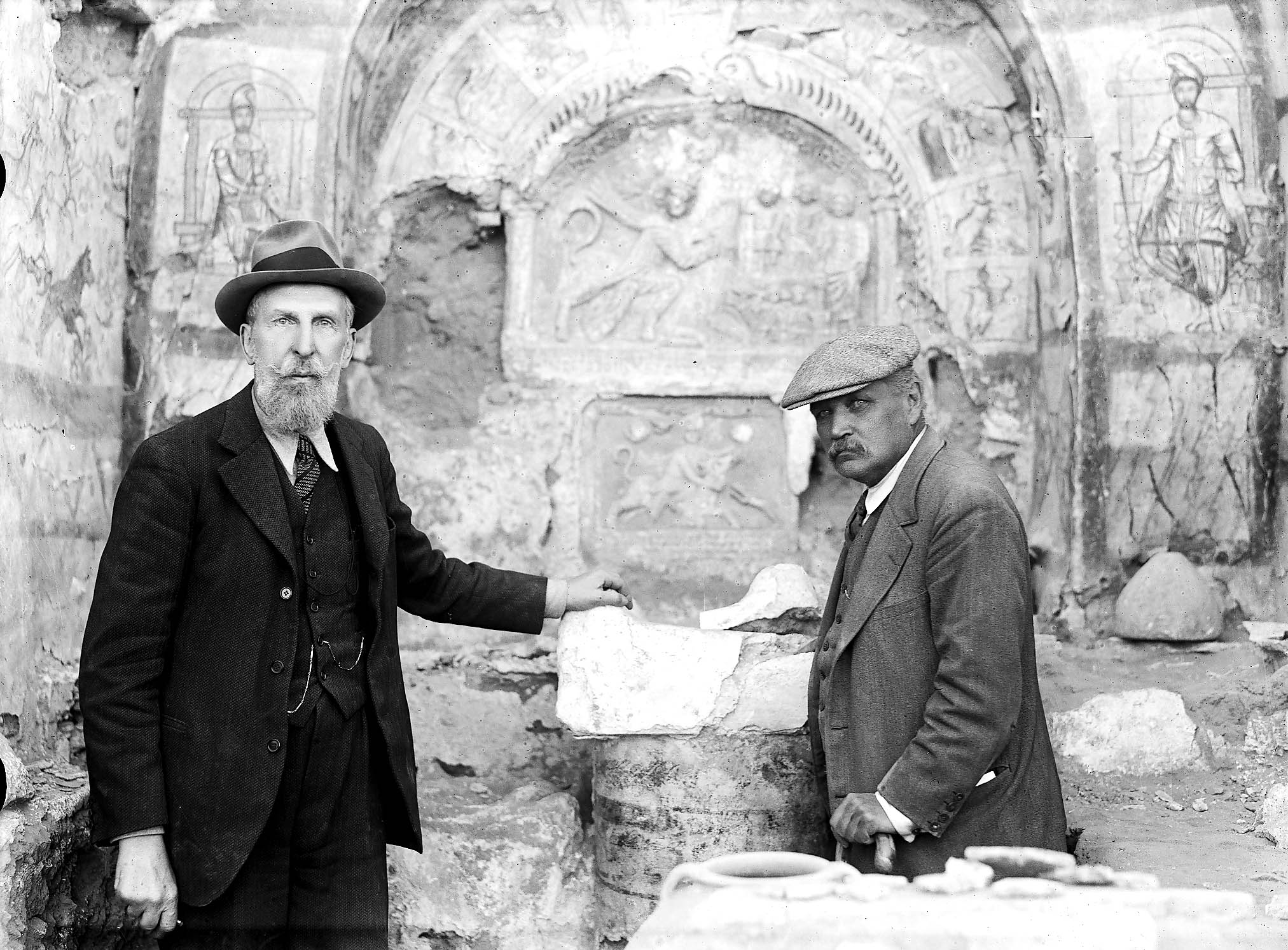
Cumont and Rostovtzeff in the Mithraeum

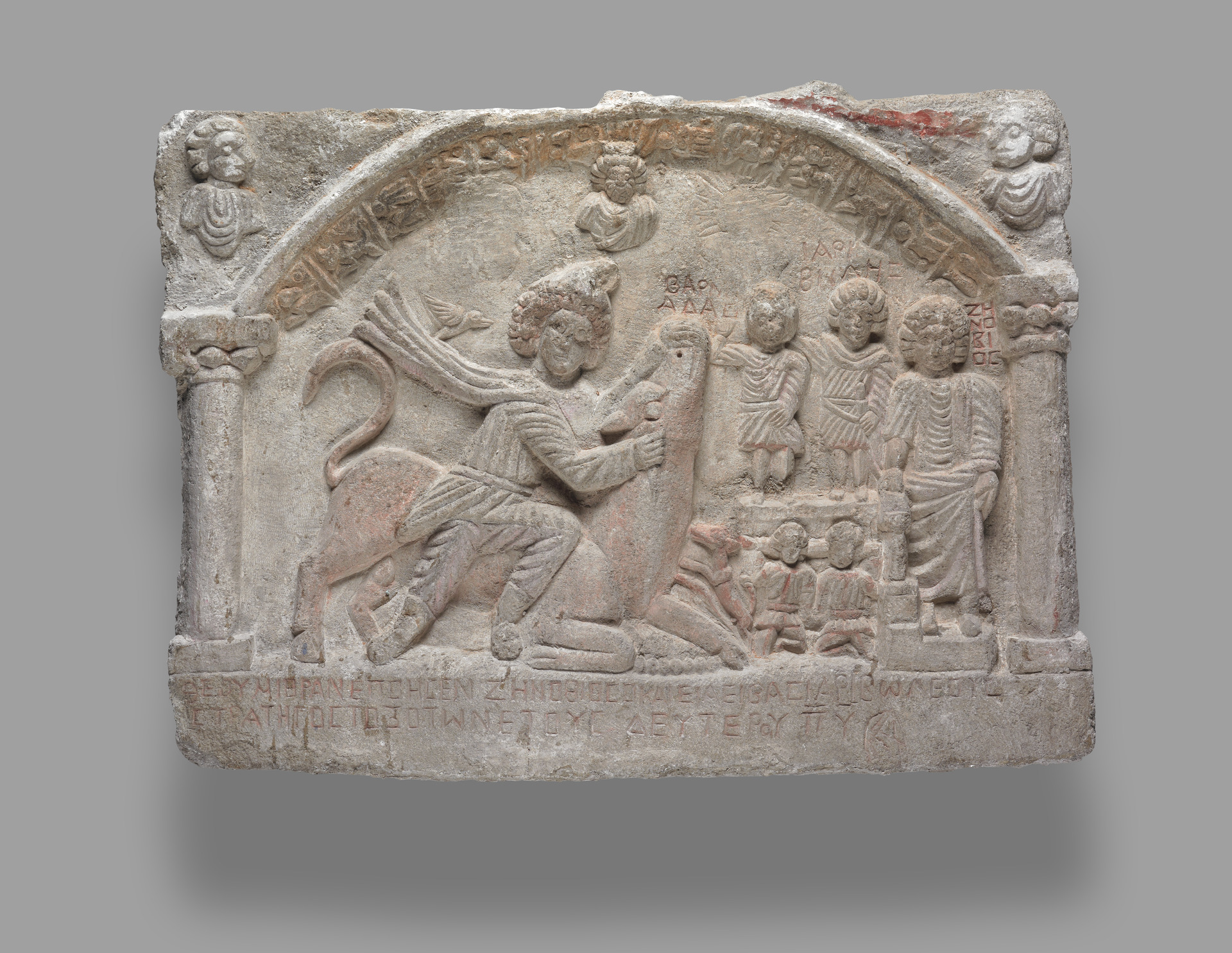
Relief from the Mithraeum

Also partially preserved by the defensive embankment, was the Mithraeum, between towers 23 and 24. It was unearthed in January 1934 after years of expectation as to whether Dura would reveal traces of the Roman Mithraic cult. The earliest archaeological traces found within the temple are from between 168 and 171 AD, which coincides with the arrival of Lucius Verus and his troops. At this stage it was still a room in a private home. It was extended and renovated between 209 and 211, and most of the frescoes are from this period. The tabula ansata of 210 offers salutation to Septimus Severus, Caracalla, and Geta. The construction was managed by a centurio principe praepositus of the Legio IIII Scythica and the Legio XVI Flavia Firma, and it seems that construction was done by imperial troops. The mithraeum was enlarged again in 240, but in 256—with war with Sasanians looming—the sanctuary was filled in and became part of the strengthened fortifications. Following excavations, the temple was transported in pieces to New Haven, Connecticut, where it was rebuilt (and is now on display) at the Yale University Art Gallery.

The surviving frescoes, graffiti, and dipinti (painted inscriptions, which number in the dozens) are of enormous interest in the study of the social composition of the cult. The statuary and altars were found intact, as was the typical relief of Mithras slaying the bull, with the hero-god dressed, as usual, in "oriental" costume ("trousers, boots, and pointed cap"). As is typical for mithraea in the Roman provinces in the Greek East, the inscriptions and graffiti are mostly in Greek, with the rest in Palmyrene (and some in Hellenized Hebrew). The end of the sanctuary features an arch with a seated figure on each of the two supporting columns. Inside, and following the form of the arch, is a series of depictions of the zodiac. Within the framework of the now-obsolete theory that the Roman cult was "a Roman form of Mazdaism" (la forme romaine du mazdeisme), Cumont supposed that the two Dura friezes represented the two primary figures of his Les Mages hellénisés, i.e. Zoroaster and Ostanes. This reading has not found favor with others: "the two figures are Palmyrene in all their characteristic traits" and are more probably portraits of leading members of that mithraeum's congregation of Syrian auxiliaries.

== Timeline of known events at Dura-Europos ==
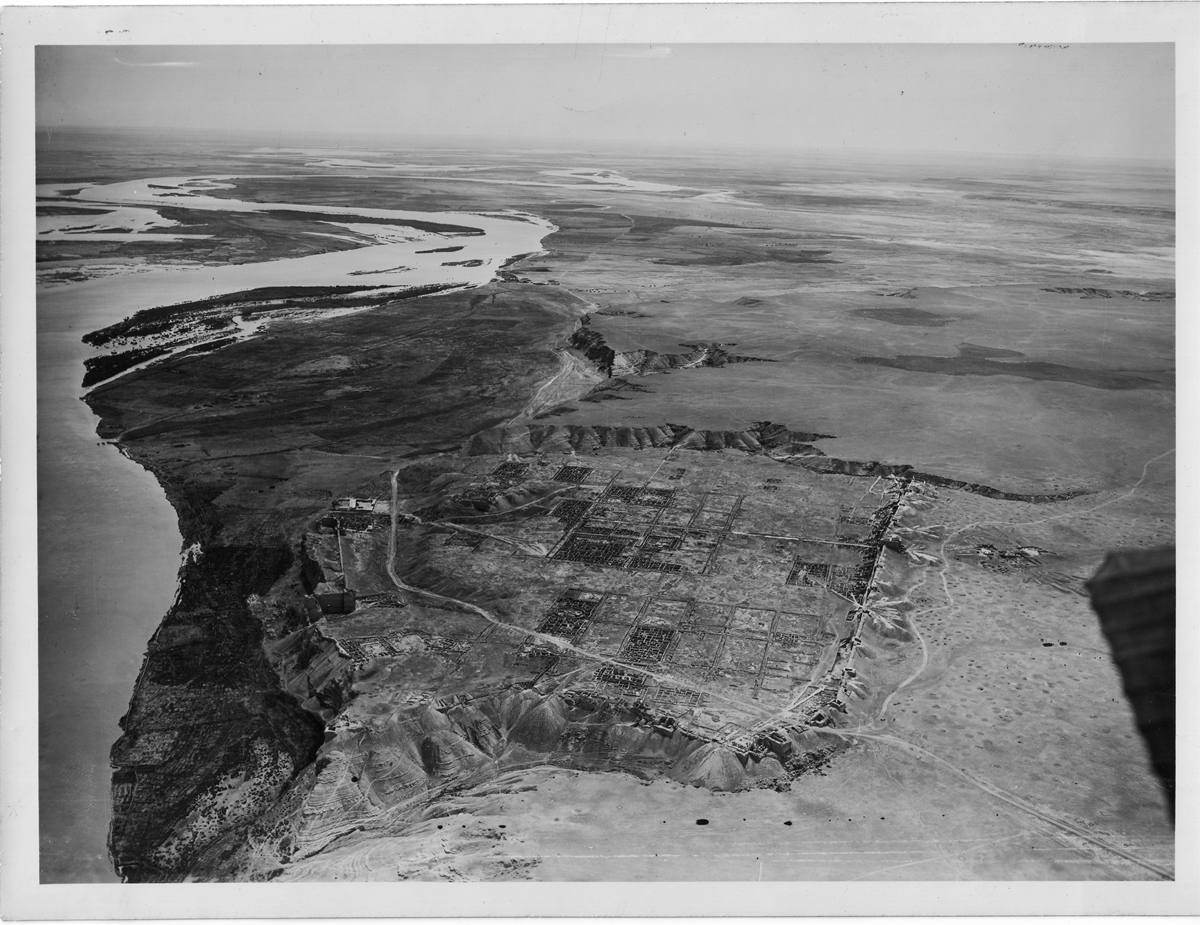
Aerial view of Dura in late 1930s. Yale University Art Gallery, negative no. 2184

Based on the chronology found in (Hopkins 1979, pp. 269–271).

- c. 300 BC: Dura founded by the Seleucids as a fortress
- c. 113 BC: Parthians take Dura
- c. 65–19 BC: City walls constructed, including some towers
- c. 33 BC: Dura becomes a Parthian provincial administrative centre
- c. 17–16 BC: Palmyrene Gate begun
- 116 AD: Trajan takes Dura and triumphal arch built
- 121 AD: Parthians regain Dura
- 160 AD: Earthquake
- 164 AD: Romans under Lucius Verus again control Dura
- c. 168–171 AD: Mithraeum first built
- c. 165–200 AD: House converted to synagogue
- c. 211 AD: Dura a Roman colony
- post-216 AD: City walls heightened
- c. 224 AD: (Parthians defeated by Sasanians)
- c. 232–256 AD: House converted into a Christian chapel and decorated
- 238 AD: Graffito stating "Persians descended on us" was written
- c. 240 AD: Mithraeum rebuilt
- c. 244–254 AD: Synagogue paintings
- 253 AD: First Sasanian attack (Note: More recent analysis (MacDonald 1986, p. 68) has thrown this into doubt.)
- post-254 AD: Defensive embankment built to bolster city walls
- 256–257 AD: Dura falls to the Sasanian king Shapur I, the population was deported. (Note: (MacDonald 1986, p. 68) prefers 257 as the fall, based on the lateness in the year of the issue from the mint of the coins found at Dura which provided the year 256. He also argues that a garrison of Sassanid forces probably remained in the city for perhaps a year after the locals had been deported.)

== Archaeology ==
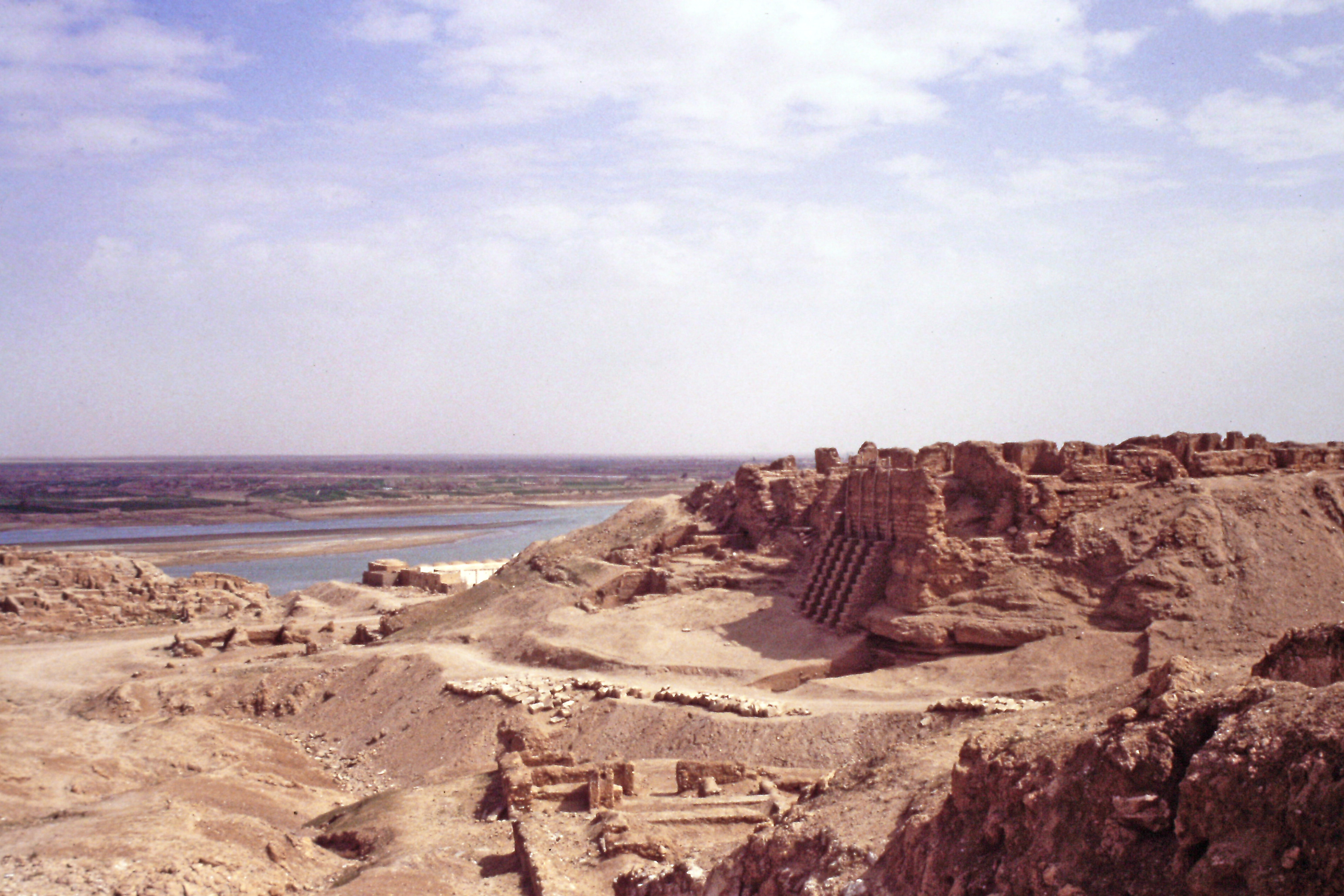
View of excavations and Euphrates.

=== Overview ===
The existence of Dura-Europos was long known through literary sources. Its actual location was rediscovered by the American "Wolfe Expedition" in 1885, when the Palmyrene Gate was photographed by John Henry Haynes.

British troops under Captain Murphy, in the aftermath of World War I and the Arab Revolt, also explored the ruins. On March 30, 1920, a soldier digging a trench uncovered brilliantly fresh wall-paintings in the Temple of Bel. The American archeologist James Henry Breasted, then at Baghdad, was alerted. Major excavations were carried out in the 1920s and 1930s by French and American teams. The first archaeology on the site, undertaken by Franz Cumont and published in 1922–23, identified the site with Dura-Europos, and uncovered a temple, before renewed hostilities in the area closed it to archaeology. Later, renewed campaigns directed by Clark Hopkins and Michael Rostovtzeff continued until 1937, when funds ran out, with only part of the excavations published.

In 1986 excavations resumed in a joint Franco-Syrian effort under the direction of Pierre Leriche. Fifteen years of excavations led to a revival of issues on the Hellenistic levels (P. Leriche) and on the history of the city thanks to studies on the fortifications (J.-C. Bessac 1997) and stone architecture (J. Abdul Massih 2000) and mud brick (M. Gelin 2000). The mission also resumed the study of certain formerly excavated monuments, such as the odeon, the palace of the Strategos, the temples of Zeus Megistos, Bel and Azanathkona, the houses of islets C7 and D1.

=== Archaeological site ===
The site is divided between a flat part of 45 ha, delimited by the line of the western rampart and the irregular layout of the northern and southern wadis, a narrow part culminating at an altitude of 218 m, crowned by the walls of the citadel, and a lower part 20 m below the top of the plateau. This depression is the meeting of two ravines: the first begins in the northeast of the site and runs along the western limit of the citadel, before joining the east–west ravine incised in the center of the plateau. The current shape of this interior wadi is the result of natural erosion but also of considerable exploitation as a stone quarry, as shown by the faces of cuts erected under the edge of the plateau to the west. The site also suffered from earthquakes, recurring since the antiquity, which caused the collapse of the eastern part of the citadel and the south-eastern quarter of the site. The enclosure, entirely cleared by the Yale excavators, is preserved in elevation, except for a few segments of the north and south ramparts.

=== Palace of the Strategos ===
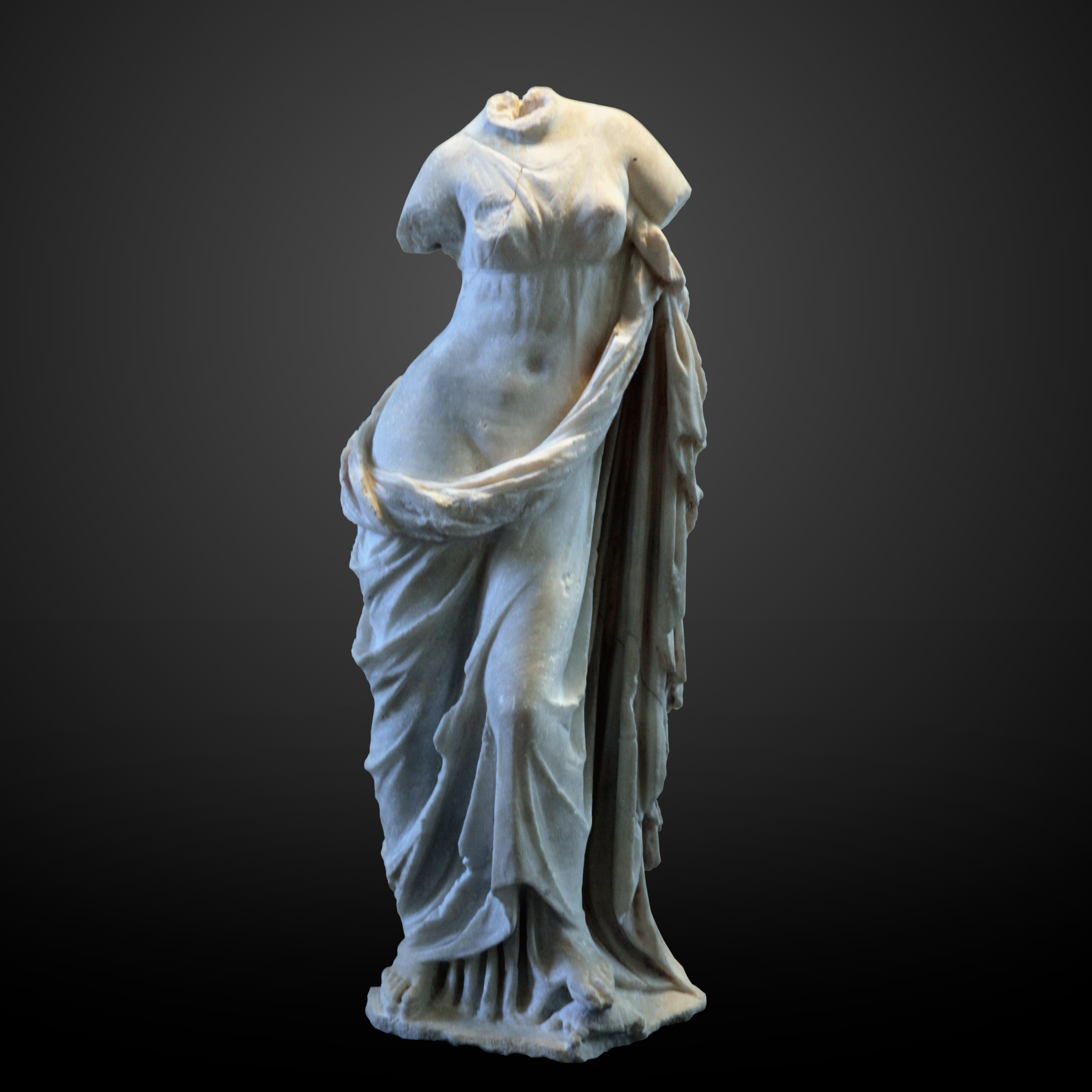
Statue of Aphrodite with a turtle found in the city

The Palace of the Strategos is organized around a central courtyard, 11 × 11.50 m, framed by a corridor on each side. Porticoes with two columns highlight the official rooms: the large vestibule at the entrance to the west and to the south, the reception room. To the north and west, corridors control access to more functional rooms. In a first phase, the courtyard covered a space a little further south with three rooms to the north, the walls of which were subsequently leveled and found in the north corridor laid out in a second phase, when the palace was extended to the north. A new facade was then built projecting onto the southern slope of the inner wadi. This extension resulted in the addition of the U corridor, along the courtyard, and three new rooms at the back of the bossed facade. The oldest floor, found in the northwest room, contained a coin of Antiochos III, which fixes around 200 BC. Dating of the first state could not be attested by the too eroded material; in relative chronology, it is dated to the course of the 3rd century.

=== Archaeological finds ===
Among the archaeological finds were astonishingly well-preserved arms and armour belonging to the Roman garrison at the time of the final Sasanian siege of 256 AD, which included painted wooden shields and complete horse armour, preserved by the very finality of the destruction of the city that journalists have called "the Pompeii of the desert". Finds from Dura-Europos are on display in the Deir ez-Zor Museum and the Yale University Art Gallery.

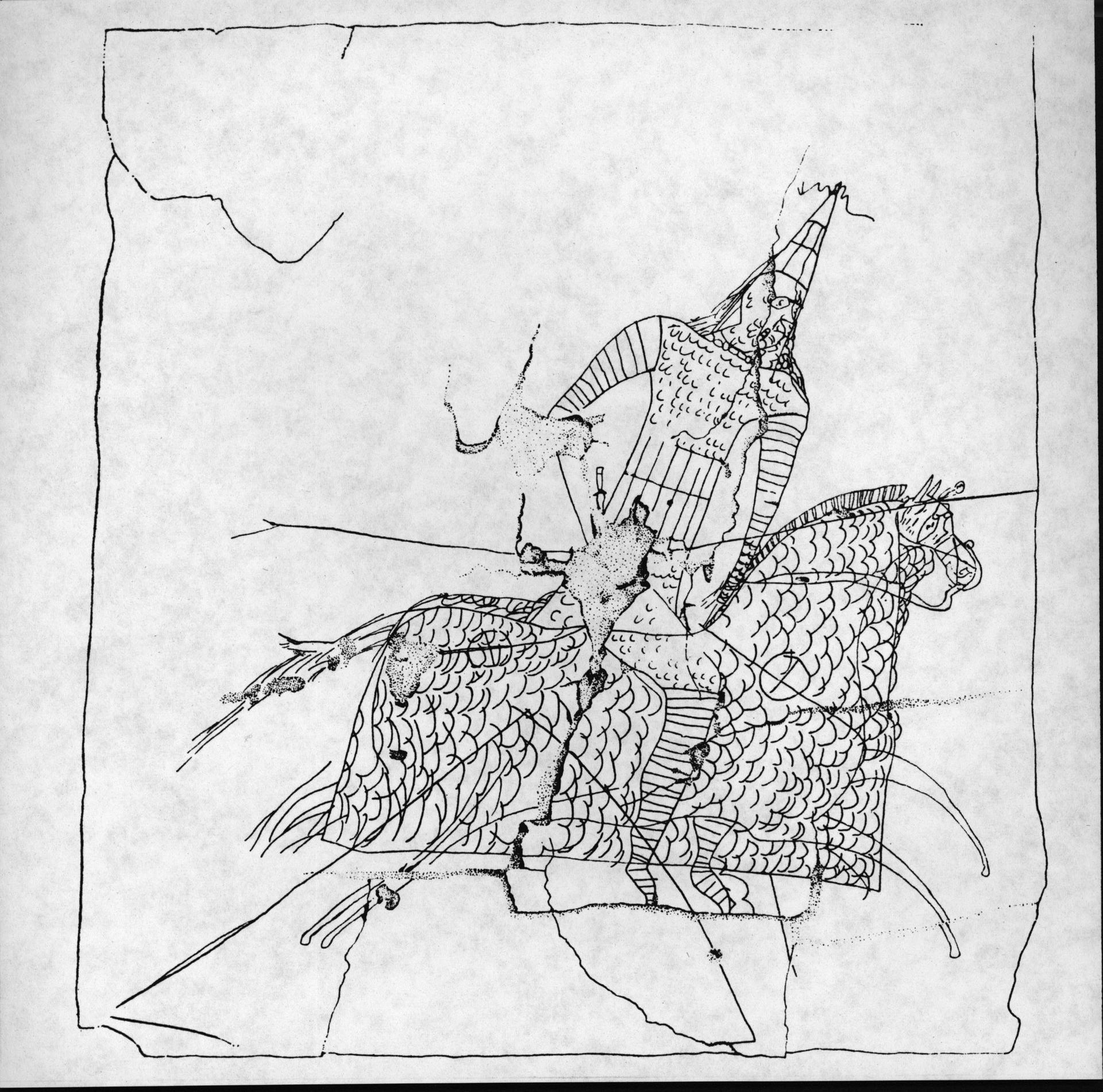
Graffito showing a warrior on a horse in full armor

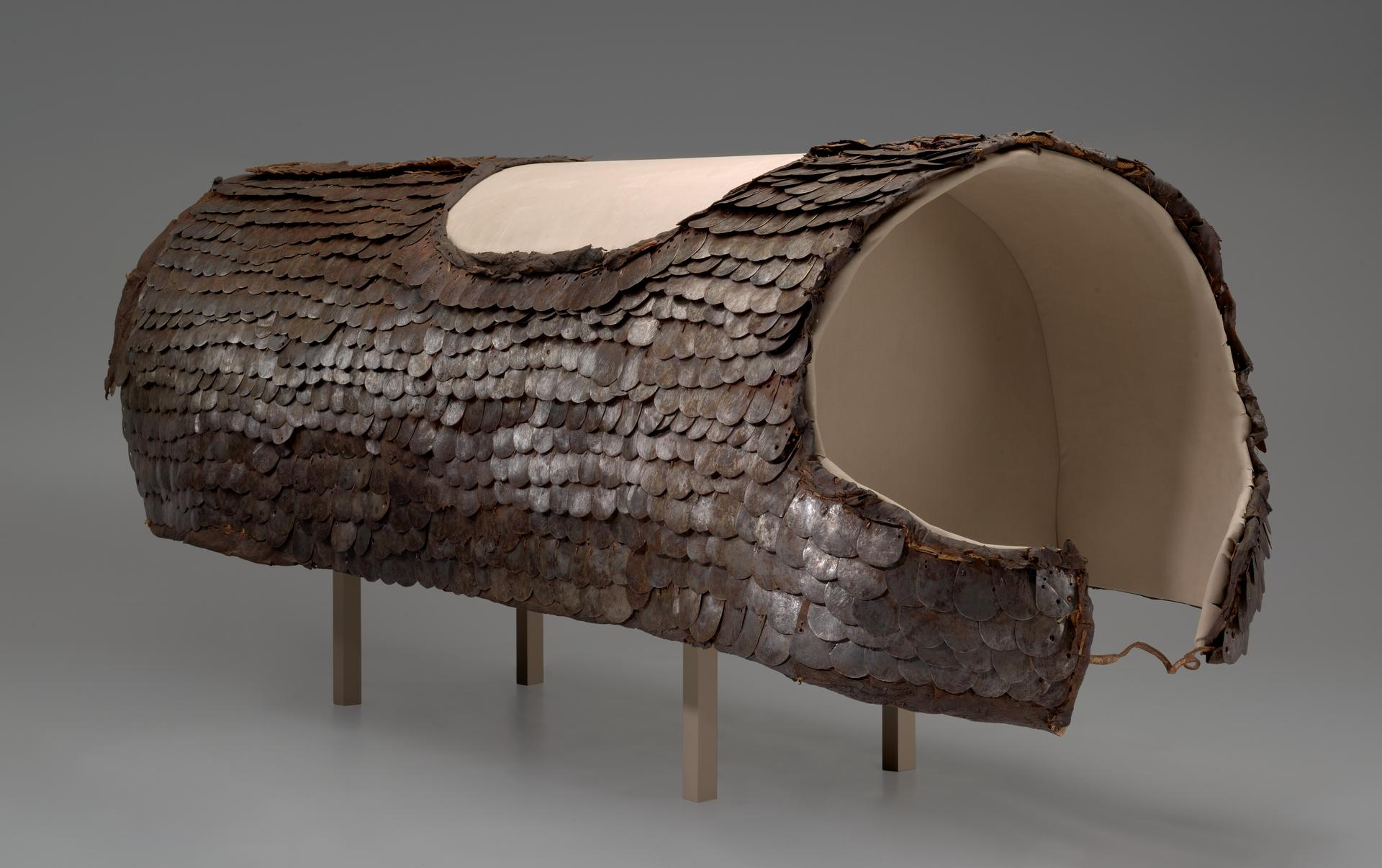
Horse armor

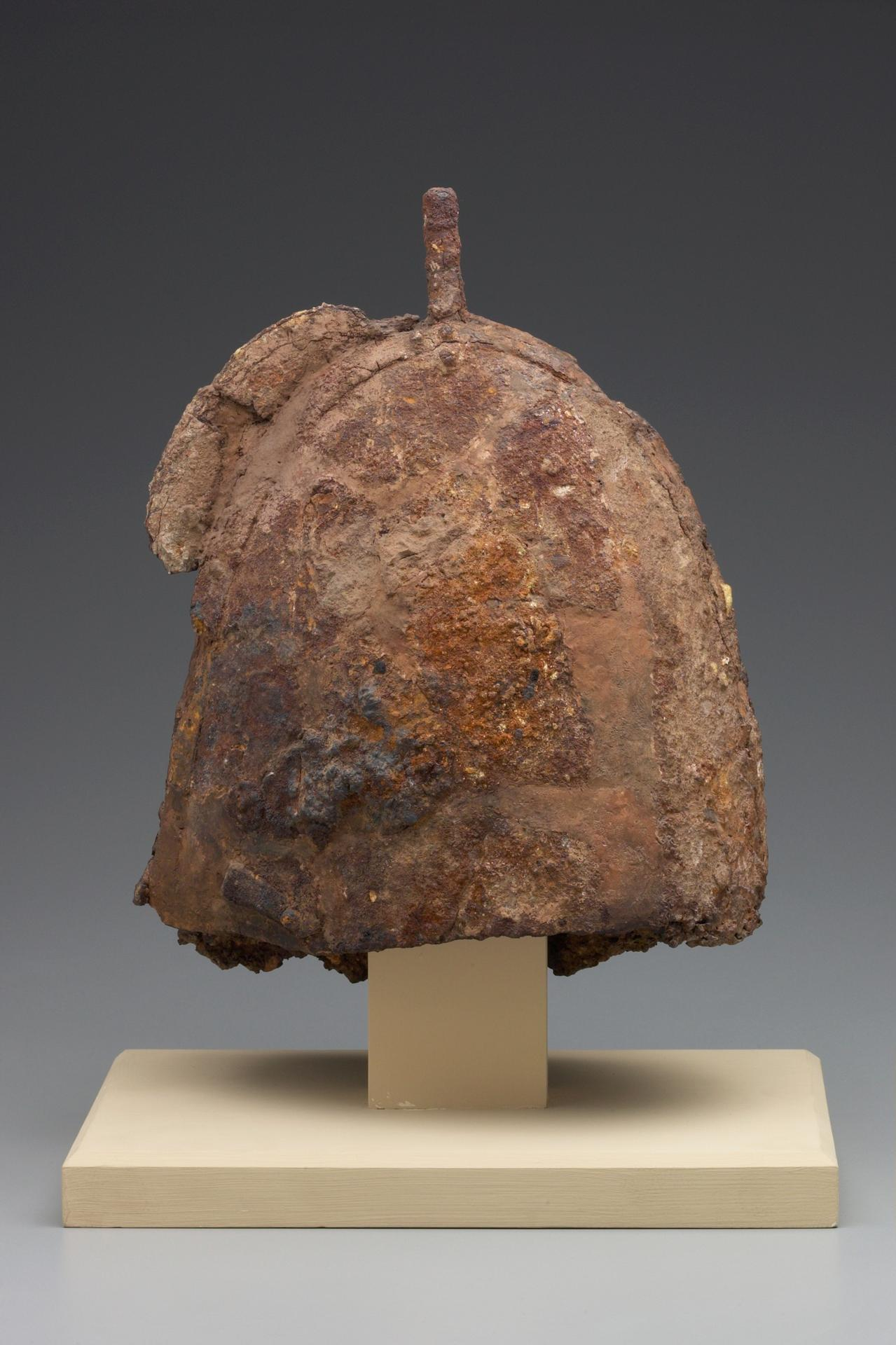
Sasanian helmet

Two sets of horse armor were found at the site. As the historian Lisa Brody wrote, "[t]he discovery singularly transformed historians' understanding of Roman cavalry equipment." These are the only full sets of scale horse armor ever found. Each set of armor was made of nearly 2,000 individual overlapping thin, scale-like plates bound together with wire. Such armor was used by Parthians, Sasanians, and later by Roman heavy cavalry. Archaeologist Simon James wrote about the discovery of the scale armor in Tower 19. Since Tower 19 was partially destroyed during a siege, sediment settled on the items inside the tower, which ended up preserving them well, allowing the armor to be incredibly intact.

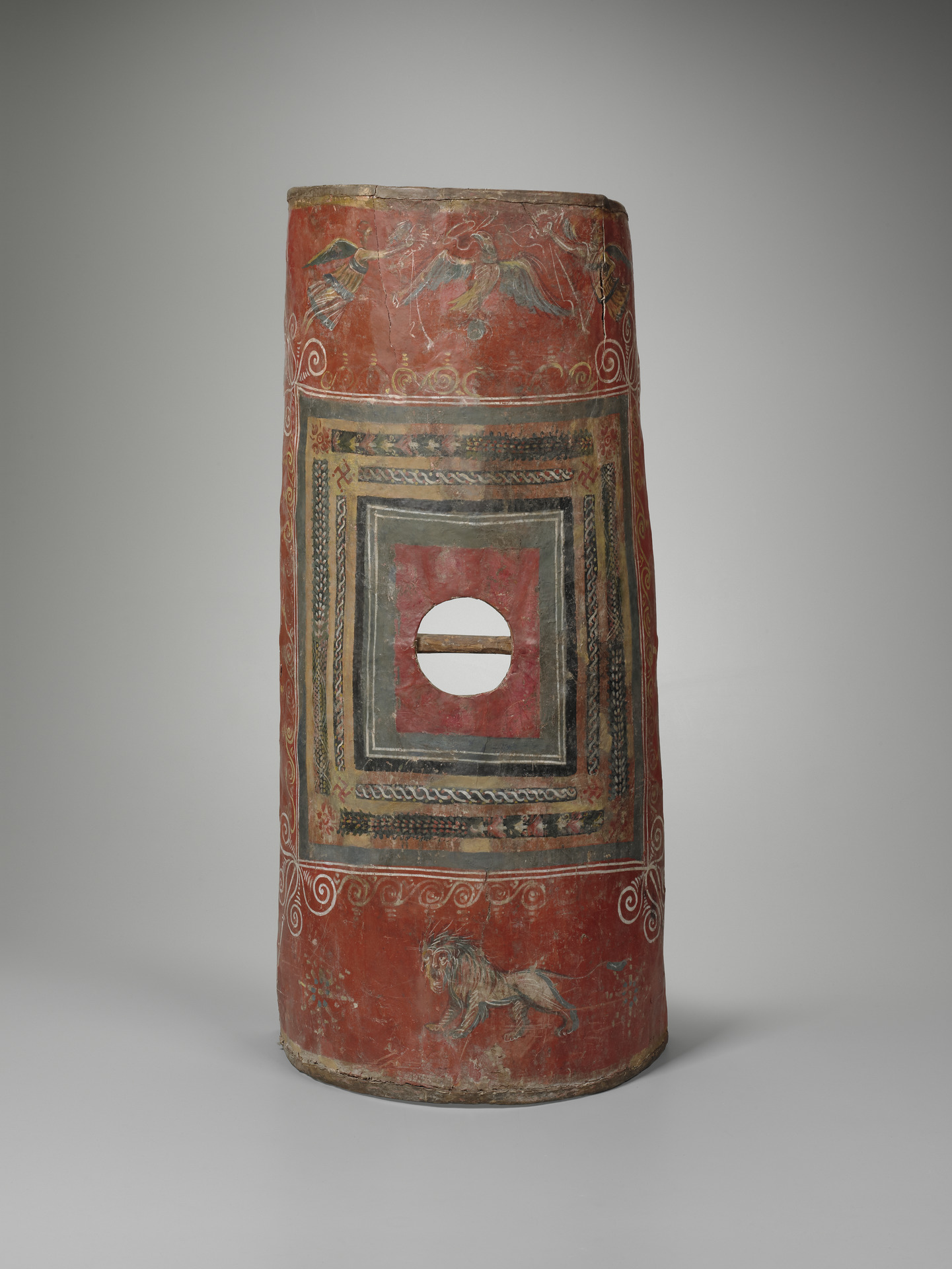
The Scutum from Dura-Europos, 3rd century AD

A painted semi-cylindrical scutum was also found at the site; it is the only one ever found. The shield was found during the excavation campaign of 1928–1937 at Tower 19. The scutum is a rectangular arched shield that measures 105.5 by 41 centimetres (41.5 by 16.1 in) and is made mostly of wood. It was found broken into thirteen pieces. It is made from strips of wood that are 30 to 80 millimetres (1.2 to 3.1 in) wide and 1.5 to 2 millimetres (0.059 to 0.079 in) thick. They are put together in three layers, so that the total thickness of the wood layer is 4.5 to 6 millimetres (0.18 to 0.24 in). In the center of the shield is a hole that was probably cut in the wood after the board was made; the umbo (central boss) is missing. The back of the shield should be provided with reinforcing strips of wood, but they weren't found. There appears to have been red skin covering the back; it is mentioned in the preliminary report of the excavation that later was lost. The surface of the front was covered with fabric and then with skin or parchment, with a painting on it. There are several decorative ribbons around the central hole. Decorations include an eagle with a laurel wreath, winged Victories, and a lion.

Another important find was that of three painted wooden shields with scenes of the Trojan War as depicted in the Iliad. On Friday, January 18, 1935, Clark Hopkins, field director of excavations, wrote in his notes:

Just after breakfast, three painted shields were found one right a top of the other. ... Herb and I spent all morning removing them. Most of the wood was strong enough to move easily and much of the painting is visible.

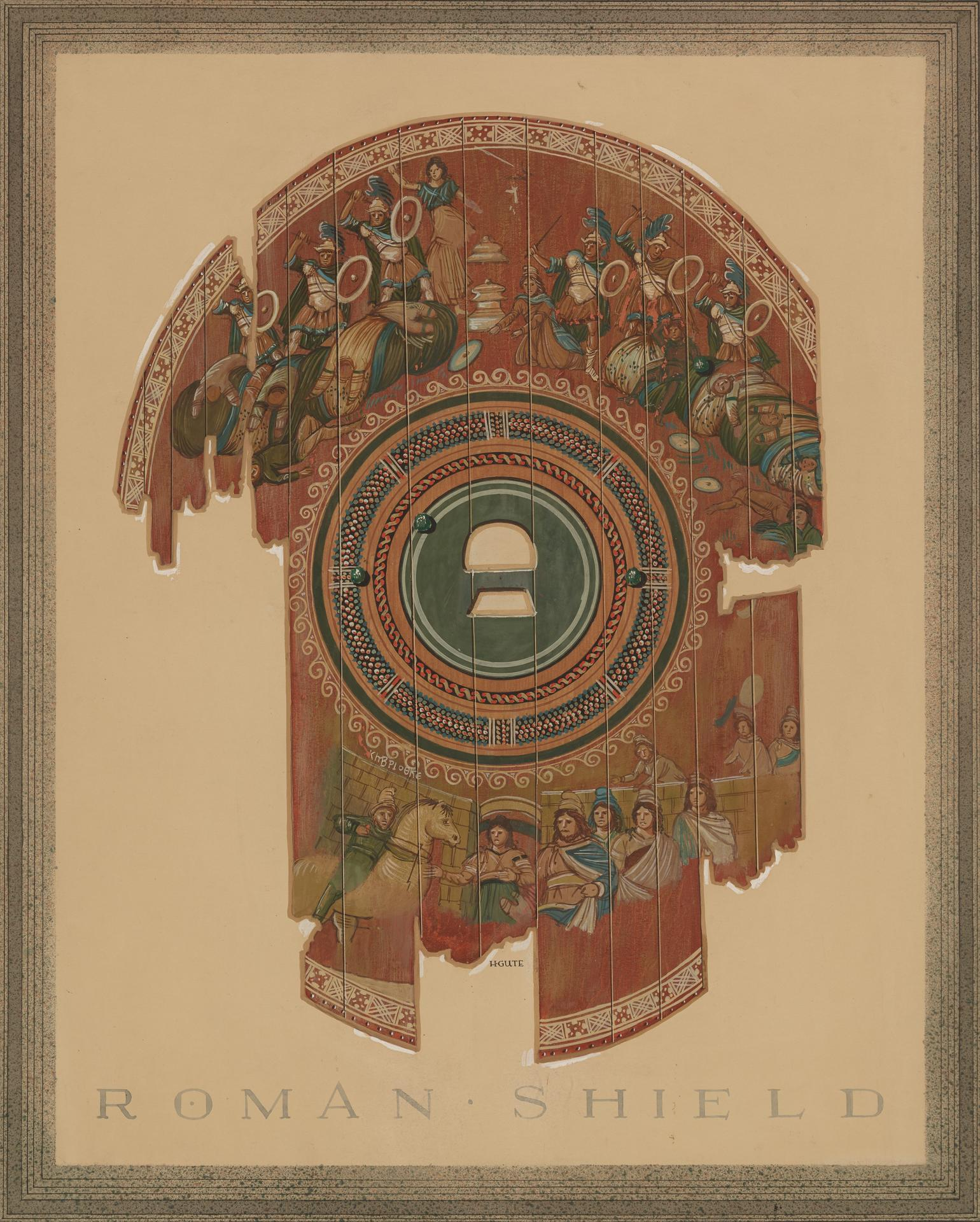
Wooden shield with scenes from the Iliad, painting by Herbert J. Gute

Each of the three shields was decorated with a distinct multi-colored scene; one showed the battle between the Greeks and the Amazons; the so-called Homeric Shield showed the tale of the Trojan horse; and a third was decorated with a warrior god. Constructed of multiple thin slats of wood joined along the long edges and painted, the oval shields—all approximately four feet (1.2 m) high by three feet (0.91 m) wide—were cleaned in the field after excavation and consolidated with polyvinyl acetate by the expedition artist Herbert Gute. When the shields were brought to Yale University in 1935, conservator George Stout and scientist Rutherford Gettens, from the Harvard University Fogg Art Museum, analyzed them and produced a comprehensive report. Also at that time, Yale School of Forestry professor Samuel Record investigated the wood and identified it as pine. The shields became the subject of close re-examination in 2011. Based on that analysis (Note: Analysis was done with ultraviolet-induced visible fluorescence (UVF), X-ray fluorescence (XRF), scanning electron microscopy and energy dispersive X-ray spectroscopy (SEM-EDS), Fourier transform infrared spectroscopy (FTIR), and Raman spectroscopy) the painted surface appears to include carbon black; calcium-based whites, including gypsum and chalk; lead white; orpiment; organic red (likely rose madder); vermilion; indigo; and red and yellow iron oxide pigments. As noted by associate conservator Irma Passeri from Yale, the shields are interesting and important examples of painted shields:

One of the more interesting aspects of the shield—one that relates it to later works such as medieval and renaissance paintings—are the preparatory and paint layers on the piece, in which we see the use of both organic and inorganic materials. It informs us how artists or artisans developed similar technologies and approaches throughout the centuries when creating works of art.

It was also noted by the examiners' team that "the shield has an interesting combination of materials—some that are indigenous to Syria and others that would have been traded."

== Modern times ==
=== Recognition ===
- In 1999, Dura-Europos was included on the "Tentative List" of UNESCO World Heritage Sites. In 2011, was again included on that list, with the nearby ancient city of Mari.
- The jury of the International Carlo Scarpa Prize for Gardens unanimously decided that their 2010 award, the twenty-first of those annual awards, would go to Dura-Europos.

=== Looting by ISIS ===
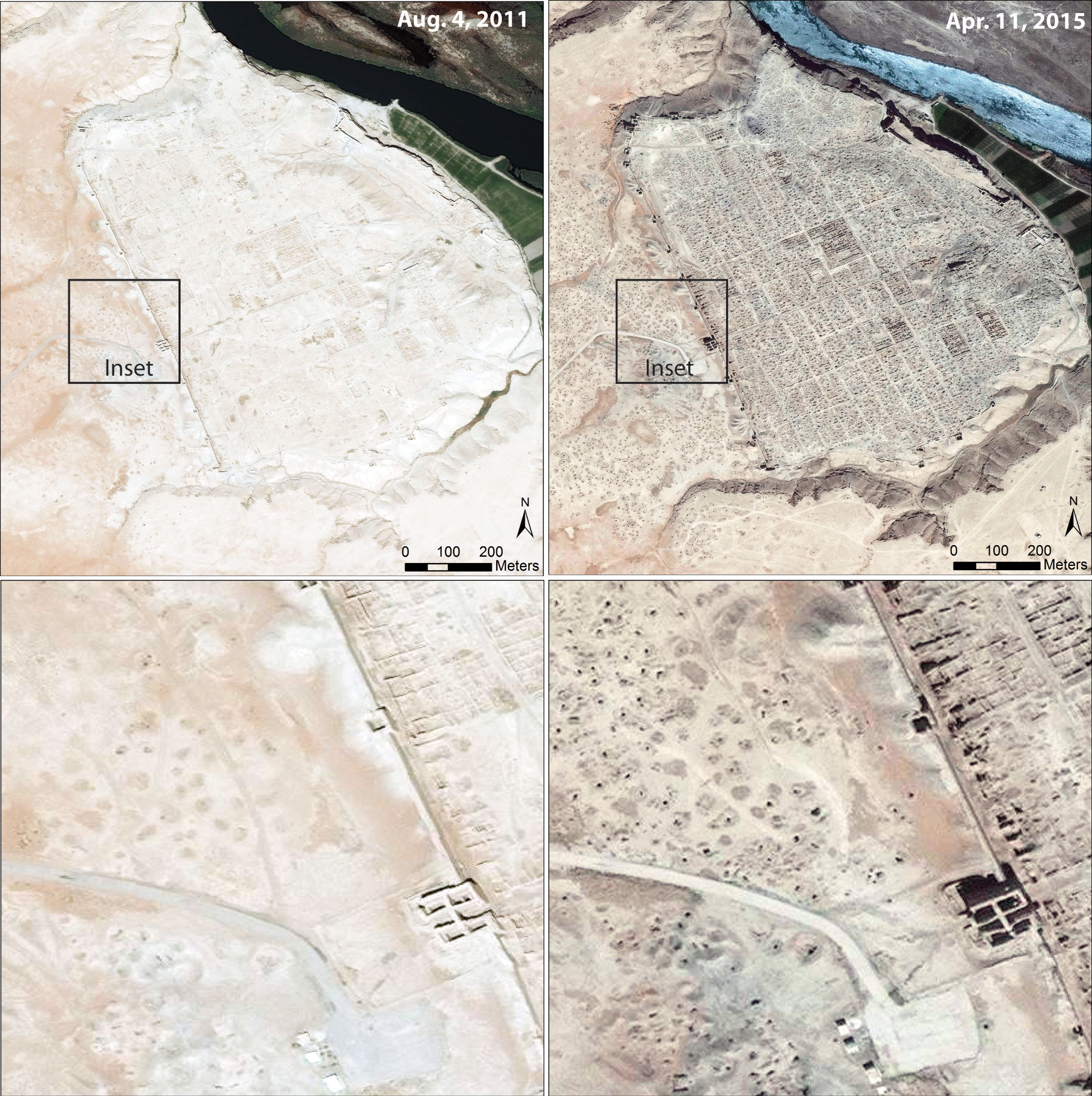
Looting of Dura-Europos, 2011–2015, satellite images by DigitalGlobe.

Between 2011 and 2014, during the Syrian Civil War, Dura-Europos was looted and mostly destroyed by the Islamic State. In 2015, according to satellite imagery, more than 70% of Dura-Europos was destroyed by looters; and National Geographic reported further plundering of the site on a massive scale by the Islamic State in order to fund their hold on the region.

=== In popular culture ===
Fire in the East (2008), the first book in the Warrior of Rome series by the Oxford scholar Harry Sidebottom, is centred around a detailed description of the Sasanian siege of Dura-Europos in 256 AD, based on the archeological finds in the site, although the city name was changed to "Arete."

The Parthian (2011) is the first novel in the Parthian Chronicles series by Peter Darman. These chronicles have, as their central fictional character, Pacorus I, King of Dura-Europos (although the royal name Pacorus features prominently during the Parthian Empire), who lived at the same time as the rebel Roman gladiator Spartacus and was part of Spartacus's army before being freed in Italy and then returning home to Parthia, where he became the most feared warrior in the empire.

The first edition of Agatha Christie's Murder in Mesopotamia of 1936 shows on its cover the view from the high escarpment at Dura. Christie, her husband Max Mallowan and Robin Halliday Macartney, who designed the cover, had visited Dura-Europos on 8 November 1934.

== See also ==
- Destruction of cultural heritage by the Islamic State
- List of cities of the ancient Near East

== Sources ==
Books

- Baird, Jennifer A. (2014). The Inner Lives of Ancient Houses: An Archaeology of Dura-Europos. Oxford, New York: Oxford University Press. ISBN 978-0-19-968765-7.
- Baird, Jennifer A. (2018). Dura-Europos. London, UK: Bloomsbury Academic. ISBN 978-1-4725-3087-5.
- Bonatz, Dominik; Kühne, Hartmut; Mahmoud, As'ad (1998). Rivers and steppes. Cultural heritage and environment of the Syrian Jezireh. Catalogue to the Museum of Deir ez-Zor. Damascus: Ministry of Culture. OCLC 638775287.
- Brock, Sebastian P. (2008). The history of the Holy Mar Maʻin with a guide to the Persian martyr acts (1st Gorgias Press ed.). Piscataway, NJ: Gorgias Press. ISBN 978-1-59333-222-8.
- Brody, Lisa R.; Hoffman, Gail L. (2011). Dura-Europos: crossroads of antiquity. Chestnut Hill, Mass.; Chicago, Ill. : McMullen Museum of Art, Boston College : dist. by the University of Chicago Press. ISBN 978-1-892850-16-4.
- Burns, Ross (2009). Monuments of Syria: A Guide. I.B.Tauris. ISBN 978-0-85771-489-3.
- Chi, Jennifer Y.; Heath, Sebastian, eds. (2011). Edge of empires: pagans, Jews, and Christians at Roman Dura-Europos. New York, NY: Institute for the Study of the Ancient World, New York University. ISBN 978-0-691-15468-8.
- Cumont, Franz (1939). The excavations at Dura-Europos: conducted by Yale university and the French academy of inscriptions and letters. Yale University Press.
- Cumont, Franz; Francis, Eric David, ed., trans. (1975), "The Dura Mithraeum", in Hinnells, John R. (ed.), Mithraic studies: Proceedings of the First International Congress of Mithraic Studies, Manchester UP, pp. I.151–214.
- Dirven, Lucinda (2011). "Strangers and Sojourners. The religious behavior of Palmyrenes and other foreigners in Dura-Europos". In Brody, Lisa R.; Hoffman, Gail L. (eds.). Dura-Europos: crossroads of antiquity (PDF). Chestnut Hill, Mass.: McMullen Museum of Art, Boston College. ISBN 978-1-892850-16-4.
- Dirven, Lucinda (1999). The Palmyrenes of Dura-Europos: A Study of Religious Interaction in Roman Syria. Religions in the Graeco–Roman World. Vol. 138. Brill. ISBN 978-90-04-11589-7. ISSN 0927-7633.
- Drijvers, Han J. W.; Vanstiphout, H. L. Herman L. J.; Bekkum, Wout Jacques van; Gelder, G. J. H. van; Reinink, Gerrit Jan (1999). All Those Nations – Cultural Encounters Within and with the Near East: Studies Presented to Hans Drijvers at the Occasion of His Sixty-fifth Birthday by Colleagues and Students. BRILL. ISBN 978-90-5693-032-5.
- Downey, Susan B. (1977). The stone and plaster sculpture. Los Angeles: Institute of Archaeology, University of California. p. 164. ISBN 0-917956-04-4. OCLC 4389924.
- Downey, Susan B. (2003). Terracotta Figurines and Plaques from Dura-Europos. University of Michigan Press. ISBN 978-0-472-11237-1.
- Gaborit, Justine (11 January 2018). "Doura-Europos (Syrie) – E14". La vallée engloutie (Volume 2 : catalogue des sites): Géographie historique du Moyen-Euphrate (du IVe s. av. J.-C. au VIIe s. apr. J.-C.). Presses de l'Ifpo. ISBN 978-2-35159-539-8.
- James, Simon (2019). The Roman military base at Dura-Europos, Syria: an archaeological visualization (First ed.). Oxford, United Kingdom: Oxford University Press. ISBN 978-0-19-874356-9.
- Ingholt, Harald (1954). Palmyrene and Gandharan Sculpture: An Exhibition Illustrating the Cultural Interrelations Between the Parthian Empire and Its Neighbors West and East, Palmyra and Gandhara. Yale University Art Gallery.
- Hillers, Delbert R.; Cussini, Eleonora (1995). Palmyrene Aramaic texts. Baltimore, MD: Johns Hopkins University Press. ISBN 978-0-8018-5278-7.
- Hopkins, Clark (1979). The discovery of Dura-Europos. New Haven: Yale University Press. ISBN 978-0-300-02288-9.
- Hvidberg-Hansen, Finn O. (2007). 'Arṣû and 'Azîzû: a study of the West Semitic "Dioscuri" and the gods of dawn and dusk (PDF). Copenhagen: Det Kongelige Danske Videnskabernes Selskab. ISBN 978-87-7304-311-0.
- Iovine, Giulio (2023). Latin military papyri of Dura-Europos (P.Dura 55-145): a new edition of the texts, with introduction and notes. Cambridge; New York: Cambridge University Press. ISBN 978-1-009-18313-0.
- Lönnqvist, Minna (2008). Jebel Bishri in context : introduction to the archaeological studies and the neighbourhood of Jebel Bishri in central Syria: Proceedings of a Nordic research training seminar in Syria, May 2004. Oxford: Archaeopres. ISBN 978-1-4073-0303-1.
- McKay, John; Hill, Bennett (2011). A History of World Societies, Combined Volume (9 ed.). United States of America: Macmillan. p. 166. ISBN 978-0-312-66691-0.
- Millar, Fergus (1993). The Roman Near East, 31 B.C.-A.D. 337. Cambridge, Mass.: Harvard University Press. ISBN 978-0-674-77886-3.
- Ousterhout, Robert (2011). John Henry Haynes: A Photographer and Archaeologist in the Ottoman Empire 1881–1900. Istanbul: Kayık Yayıncılık.
- Rostovtzeff, M. (1938). Dura-europos And Its Art.
- Rostovtzeff, Michael Ivanovitch (1977). The Excavations at Dura-Europos. Yale University Press.
- Smith II, Andrew M. (2013). Roman Palmyra: Identity, Community, and State Formation. Oxford University Press. ISBN 978-0-19-986110-1.
- Sommer, Michael (2005). Roms orientalische Steppengrenze : Palmyra, Edessa, Dura-Europos, Hatra: eine Kulturgeschichte von Pompeius bis Diocletian. Stuttgart: Franz Steiner. ISBN 978-3-515-08724-7.
- Southern, Pat (1 January 2008). Empress Zenobia: Palmyra's Rebel Queen. A&C Black. ISBN 978-1-84725-034-6.
- Watson, Alaric (14 January 2004). Aurelian and the Third Century. Routledge. ISBN 978-1-134-90815-8.
- Weitzmann, Kurt, ed. (1979). Age of Spirituality: Late Antique and Early Christian Art, Third to Seventh Century. Catalogue of the Exhibition at the Metropolitan Museum of Art, November 19, 1977, Through February 12, 1978. New York, NY: Metropolitan Museum of Art. ISBN 978-0-87099-179-0.
- Welles, C. Bradford; Fink, Robert O; Gilliam, J. F; Henning, W. B (1959). The Parchments and papyri. Yale University Press. OCLC 6729104.
- Yon, Jean-Baptiste (2016). "Women and the Religious Life of Dura-Europos". In Kaizer, Ted (ed.). Religion, society and culture at Dura-Europos. Cambridge: Yale Classical Studies. ISBN 978-1-107-12379-3.

Articles

- Baird, J.A. (1 September 2020). "The Ruination of Dura-Europos". Theoretical Roman Archaeology Journal. 3 (1): 2. doi:10.16995/traj.421. S2CID 225238878. Material was copied from this source, which is available under a Creative Commons Attribution 4.0 International License
- Casana, Jesse; Laugier, Elise Jakoby (30 November 2017). "Satellite imagery-based monitoring of archaeological site damage in the Syrian civil war". PLOS ONE. 12 (11) e0188589. Bibcode:2017PLoSO..1288589C. doi:10.1371/journal.pone.0188589. PMC 5708659. PMID 29190783.
- Gutmann, Joseph (1988). "The Dura Europos Synagogue Paintings and Their Influence on Later Christian and Jewish Art" (PDF). Artibus et Historiae. 9 (17): 25–29. doi:10.2307/1483314. JSTOR 1483314. Archived from the original (PDF) on 27 August 2018.
- Francis, Eric David (1975b), "Mithraic graffiti from Dura-Europos", in Hinnells, John R. (ed.), Mithraic studies: Proceedings of the First International Congress of Mithraic Studies, Manchester UP, pp. II.424–445
- James, Simon (2011). "Stratagems, Combat, and "Chemical Warfare" in the Siege Mines of Dura-Europos". American Journal of Archaeology. 115 (1): 69–101. doi:10.3764/aja.115.1.69.
- James, Simon (2022). "Strange Meeting at Salihiyeh: Who Discovered (or Encountered, or Identified, or Invented) Dura-Europos, and When?". Electrum. 29: 301–328. doi:10.4467/20800909EL.22.029.16524. S2CID 253178894.
- Jones, A. H. M. (1955). "M. I. Rostovtzeff, A. R. Bellinger, F. E. Brown, and C. B. Welles, The Excavations at Dura-Europos Conducted by Yale University and the French Academy of inscriptions and letters, Preliminary Report of the Ninth Season of Work, 1935–6. Part III, The Palace of the Dux Ripae and the Dolicheneum. New Haven: Yale University Press, 1952. Pp. XVI + 134, 24 plates and 11 text-figures (including plans, elevations, and reconstructions). No price stated". The Journal of Roman Studies. 45 (1–2): 201–202. doi:10.2307/298783. ISSN 1753-528X. JSTOR 298783. S2CID 250354239.
- Hopkins, Clark (1947). "The Siege of Dura". The Classical Journal. 42 (5): 251–259. ISSN 0009-8353. Archived from the original on December 23, 2021.
- Kaizer, Ted (2009). Cotton, Hannah M; Hoyland, Robert G; Price, Jonathan J; Wasserstein, David J (eds.). "Religion and language in Dura-Europos". From Hellenism to Islam: 235–254. doi:10.1017/CBO9780511641992.011. ISBN 978-0-511-64199-2.
- Kilpatrick, George D. (1964). "Dura-Europos: The Parchments and the Papyri". Greek, Roman and Byzantine Studies. 5: 215–225.
- MacDonald, David (1986). "Dating the Fall of Dura-Europos". Historia: Zeitschrift für Alte Geschichte. 35 (1): 45–68. ISSN 0018-2311. JSTOR 4435949.
- Porter, Howard N. (1948). "A Bacchic Graffito from the Dolicheneum at Dura". The American Journal of Philology. 69 (1): 27–41. doi:10.2307/291317. JSTOR 291317.
- Rostovtzeff, M. (1933). "Hadad and Atargatis at Palmyra". American Journal of Archaeology. 37 (1): 58–63. doi:10.2307/498042. JSTOR 498042. S2CID 191373119.
- Ruffing, Kai (2007). "Dura Europos: A City on the Euphrates and her Economic Importance in the Roman Era". Topoi. Orient-Occident. 8 (1): 399–411.
- Teicher, J. L. (1963). "Ancient Eucharistic Prayers in Hebrew (Dura-Europos Parchment D. Pg. 25)". The Jewish Quarterly Review. 54 (2): 99–109. doi:10.2307/1453566. JSTOR 1453566.
- Unvala, J. M. (1930). "Doura-Eropos.: Based on "Fouilles de Doura-Eropos (1922–3) par Franz Cumont, Paris, 1926"". Bulletin of the School of Oriental and African Studies. 6 (1): 133–149. doi:10.1017/S0041977X00090984. S2CID 195514175.
