= Mithraeum of Dura-Europos =

Mithraic temple excavated in Syria

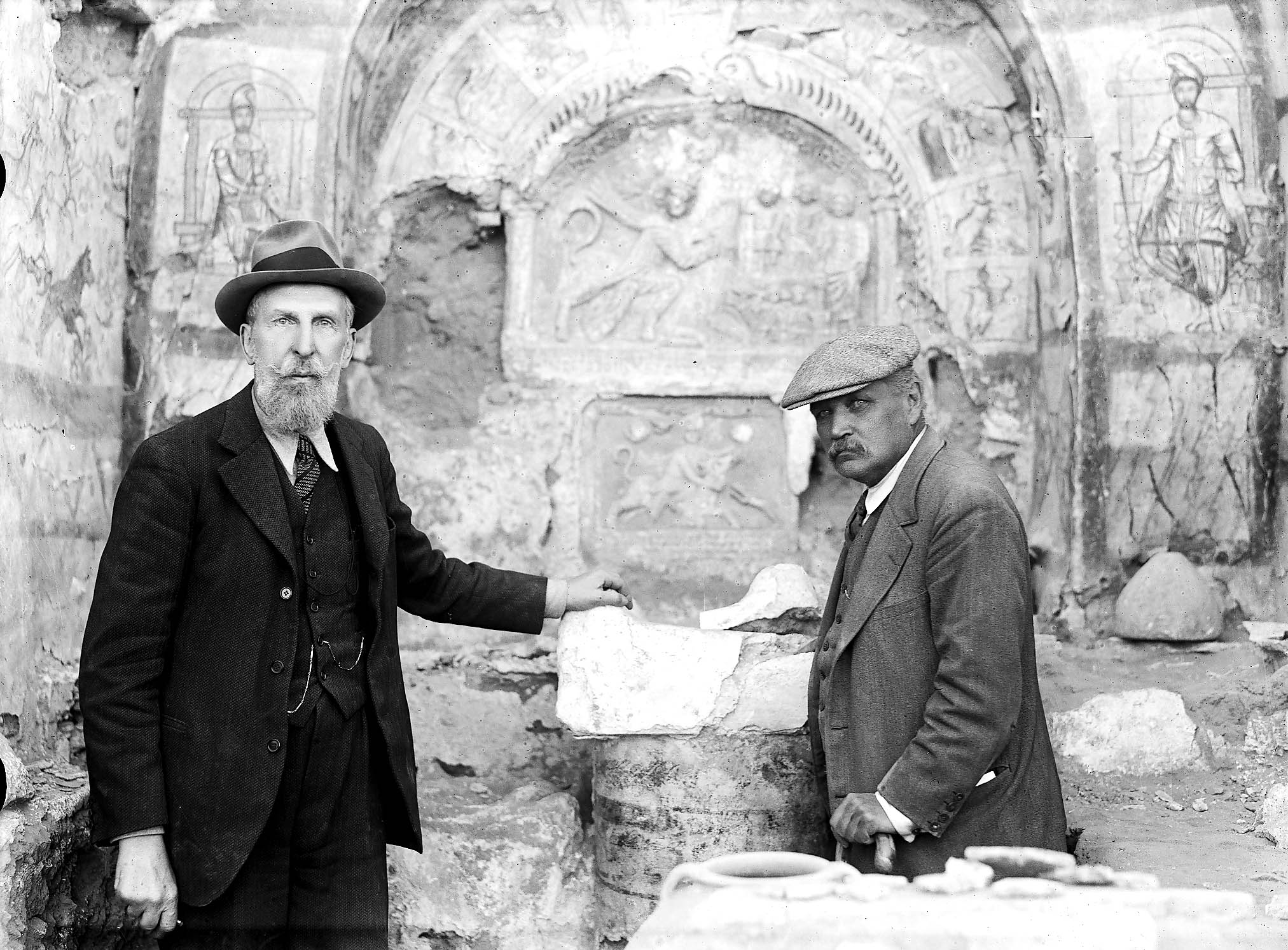
Cumont and Rostovtzeff in the Mithraeum

The Mithraeum of Dura Europos was found during excavations in the city in 1934. It is considered to be one of the best-preserved and best-documented cult buildings of Mithraism.

The temple is located in the northwest of the city, near the city wall. It is a free-standing building made of adobe bricks. The execution of the masonry is described in the preliminary report as rather poor. There were three construction phases. At the beginning it was a cult room built into a residential building, which over the years has been expanded and further decorated. The temple is at the ground level, and resembles a basilica inside. These are rather atypical elements for mithraeum, as they were mostly designed underground and grotto-like.

== Excavation ==
The mithraeum along with the rest of the city was excavated by Clark Hopkins and Franz Cumont who were later joined by Rostovtzeff and Robert du Mesnil du Buisson. The other members were Maurice Pillet, Margaret Crosby and Frank Edward Brown. The mithraeum is significant as it was the first and only such site found in Syria until the excavations at Caesarea Maritima in 1973-74 also revealed a mithraeum.

== History and description ==
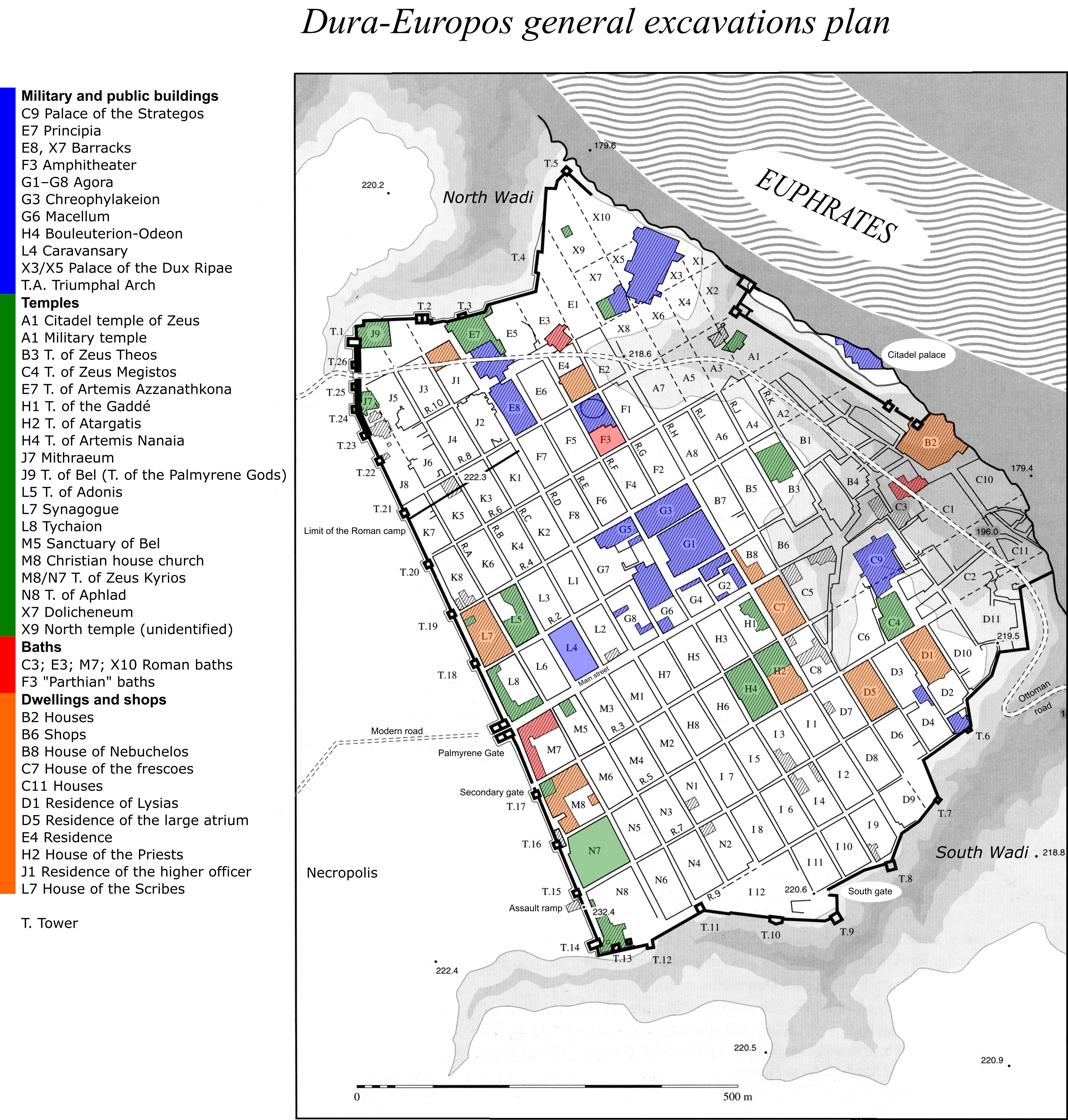
Plan of Dura-Europos showing the Mithraeum marked as J7

Partially preserved by the defensive embankment was the Mithraeum (CIMRM 34–70), located between towers 23 and 24. It was unearthed in January 1934 after years of expectation as to whether Dura would reveal traces of the Roman Mithras cult. The earliest archaeological traces found within the temple are from between AD 168 and 171, which coincides with the arrival of Lucius Verus and his troops. At this stage it was still a room in a private home. The dedicatory inscriptions of 171 AD were inscribed by soldiers of the Cohors XX Palmyrenorum.

It was extended and renovated between 209 and 211, and most of the frescoes are from this period. The tabula ansata of 210 offers salutation to Septimius Severus, Caracalla, and Geta. The construction was managed by a centurio principe praepositus of the legio IIII Scythicae et XVI Flaviae firmae (CIMRM 53), and it seems that construction was done by imperial troops. The mithraeum was enlarged again in 240, but in 256—with war with the Sassanians looming—the sanctuary was filled in and became part of the strengthened fortifications. Following excavations, the temple was transported in pieces to New Haven, Connecticut, where it was rebuilt (and is now on display) at the Yale University Art Gallery.

The surviving frescoes, graffiti and dipinti (which number in the dozens) are of enormous interest to the study of the social composition of the cult. The statuary and altars were found intact, as also the typical relief of Mithras slaying the bull, with the hero-god dressed as usual in "oriental" costume ("trousers, boots, and pointed cap"). As is typical for mithraea in the Roman provinces in the Greek East, the inscriptions and graffiti are mostly in Greek, with the rest in Palmyrene (and some Hellenized Hebrew). The end of the sanctuary features an arch with a seated figure on each of the two supporting columns. Inside and following the form of the arch is a series of depictions of the zodiac. Within the framework of the now-obsolete theory that the Roman cult was "a Roman form of Mazdaism" ("la forme romaine du mazdeisme"), Cumont supposed that the two Dura friezes represented the two primary figures of his Les Mages hellénisés, i.e. "Zoroaster" and "Ostanes". This reading has not found a footing; "the two figures are Palmyrene in all their characteristic traits" and are more probably portraits of leading members of that mithraeum's congregation of Syrian auxiliaries.

The graffiti at the site was signed and inscribed by multiple Roman and Palmyrene soldiers. The identities of most of these soldiers cannot be established completely except for those who signed either with their full names or legionary information. The graffiti reveals that from high ranking officers (including a tribune) down to lower ranks (like the optiones and significarii), soldiers of various ranks had passed through, if not prayed, at the Mithraeum.

Mithraeum reconstructed at Yale

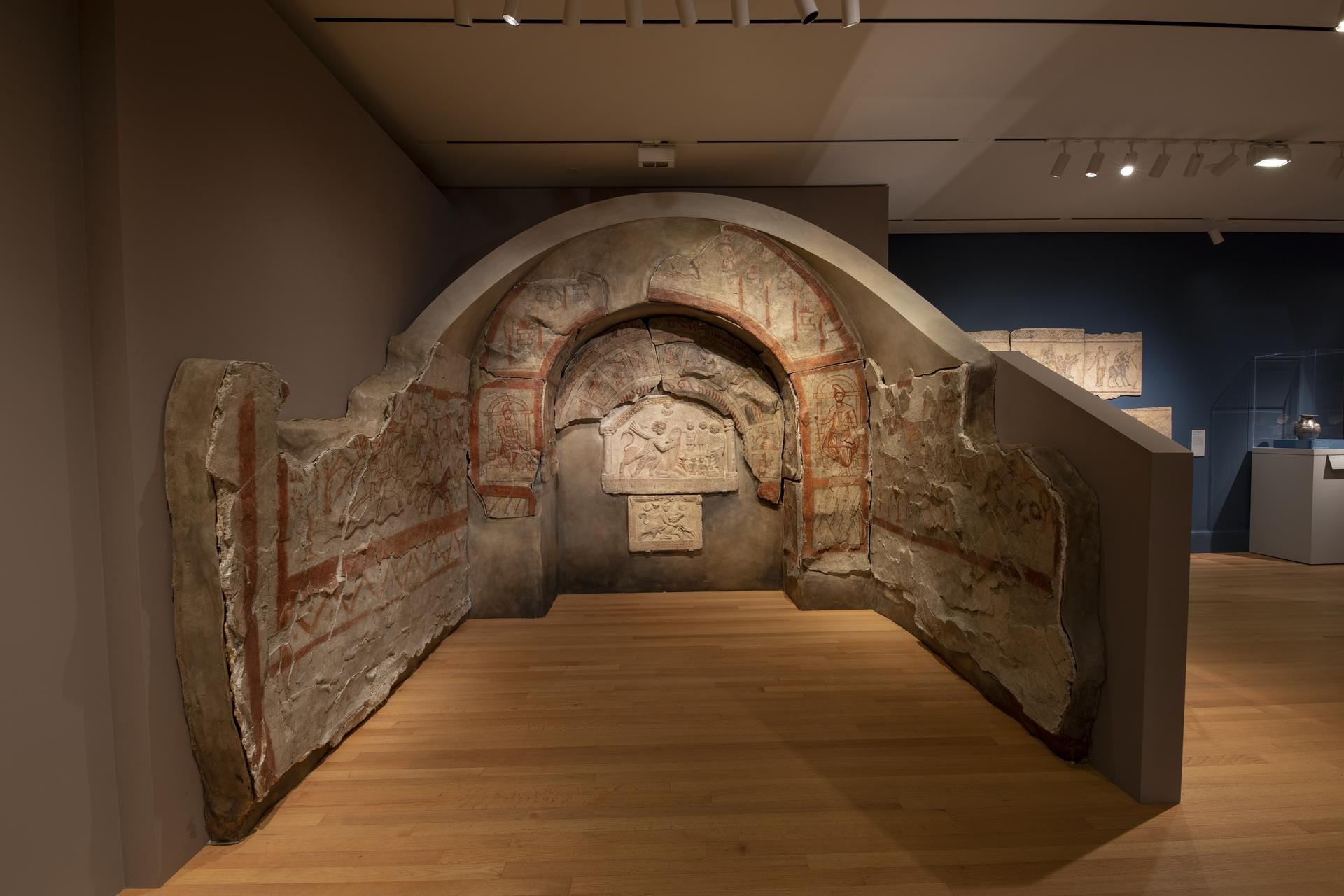

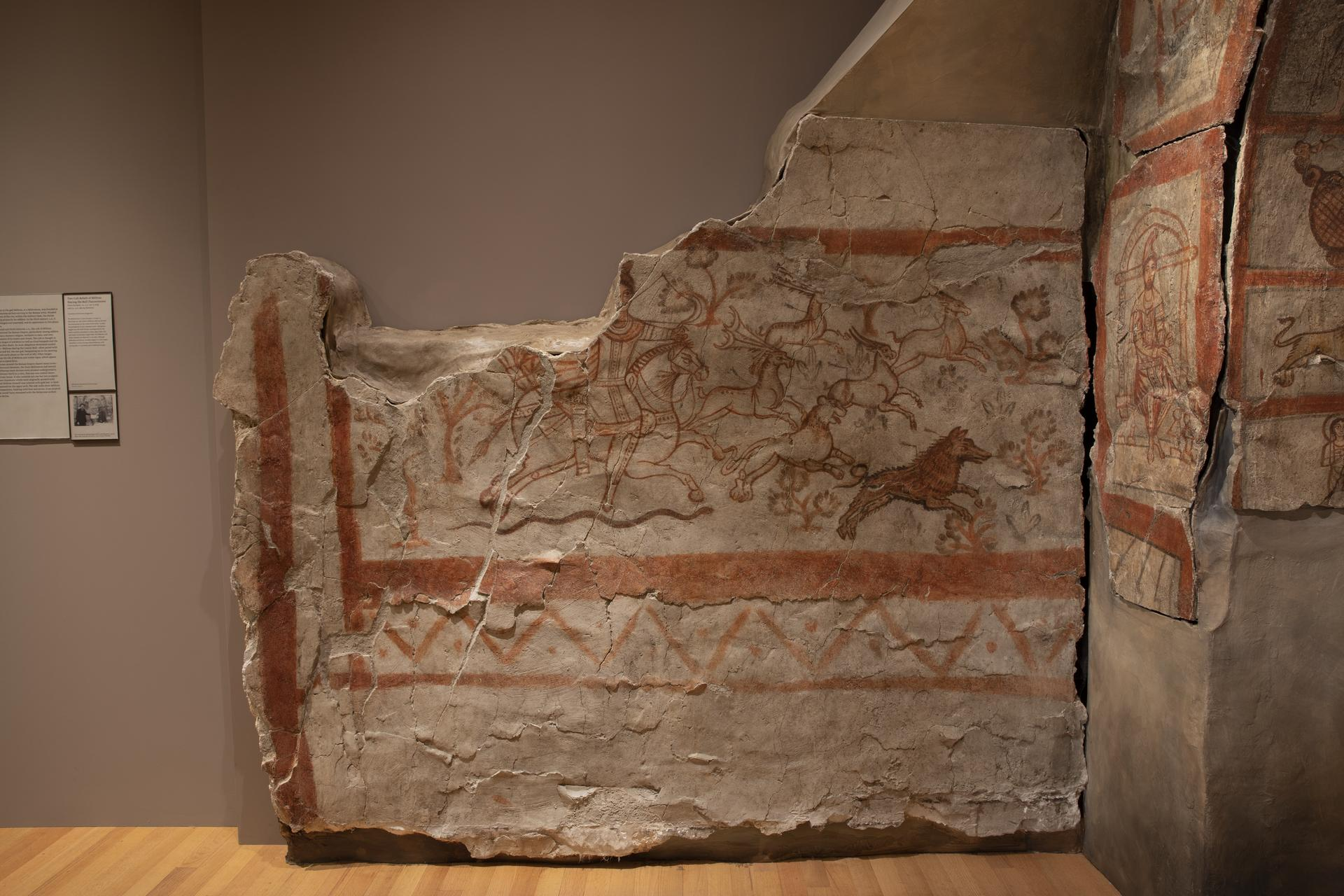

== First phase ==
The first building was erected shortly before 168 AD. Its main room was only 4.65 m long and 5.80 m wide. In addition there were two smaller rooms. A dedicatory inscription dates this building to the year 168. The inscription dates from the Stragegos Ethpeni, son of Zabde'a and is in Palmyrisch written and placed on a relief which Mithras shows how he kills the bull (Tauroctony). A second short Greek inscription just repeats his name. Rostovtzeff suspected that it was the earliest cult image in the sanctuary.

Reliefs with dedicatory inscriptions

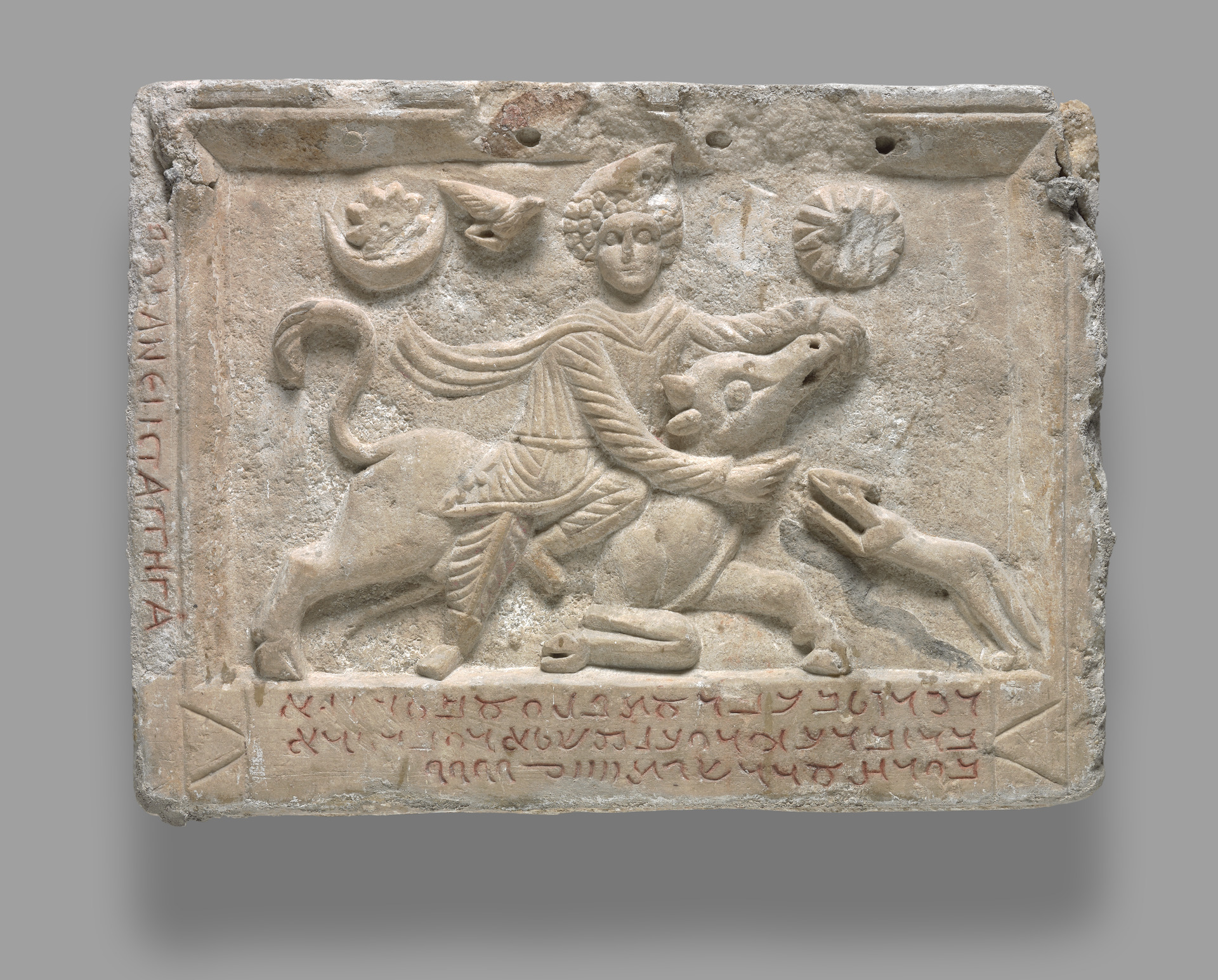
AD 168

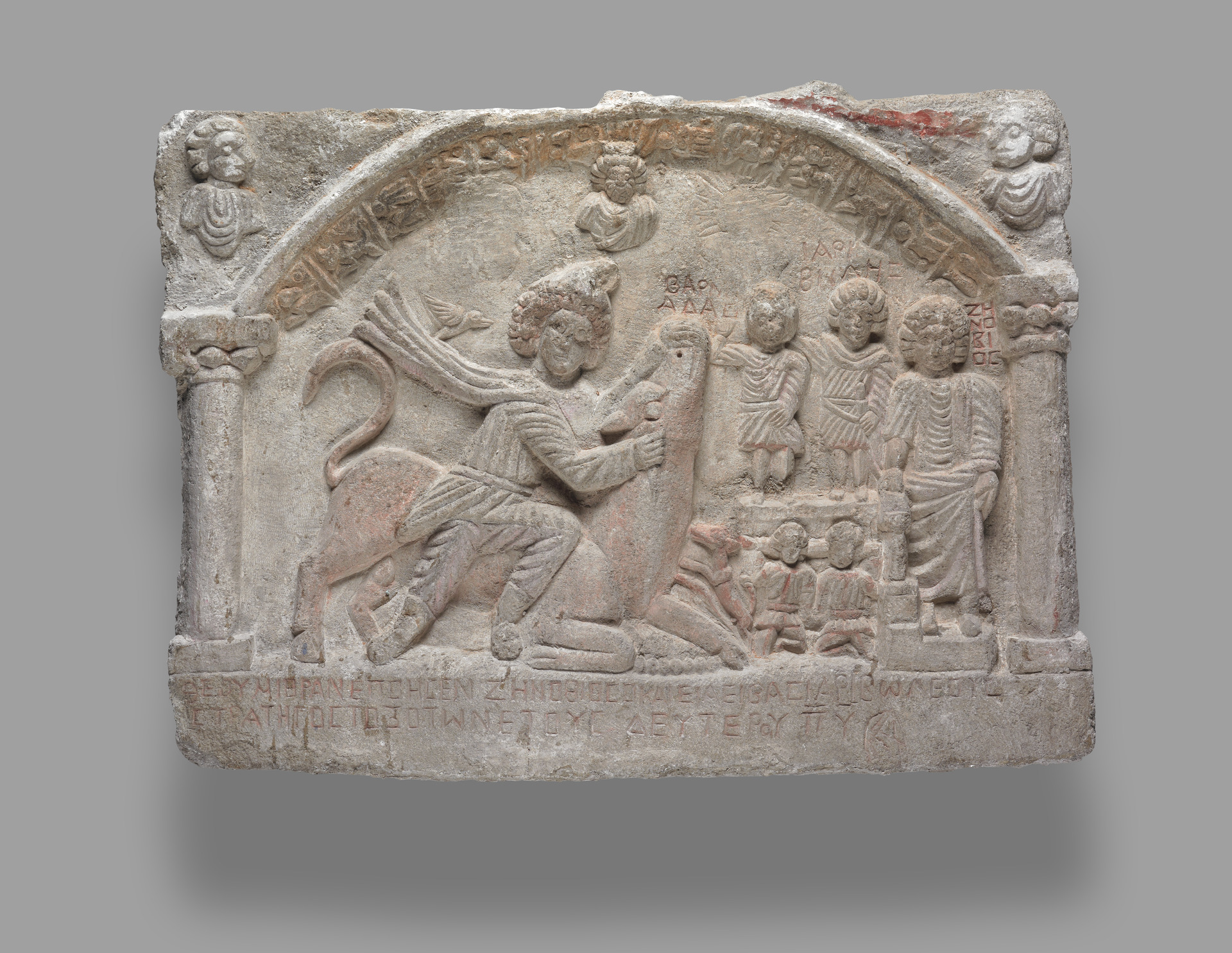
AD 170–171

A second cult image was dates just two years later. It shows a similar scene, but with some different features. The Greek dedicatory inscription reads: "For the god Mithras, made by Zenobios, who is also called Eiaebas, son of Yaribol, strategos of the archers, in the year 482 (170-171 AD)". To the right of the bull there are spectators, which otherwise is not documented for tauroctony scenes. Three of the viewers have captions. The largest figure, on the far right, is Zenobius, the donor of the relief. The other two characters are Jariboles and Barnaadath. Another peculiarity of the relief are seven balls between the bull's front hooves. The interpretation is uncertain, but the Iranian worldview divides the world into seven continents. So the representation of these seven parts of the world may be an allusion to Mithras, Lord of the whole world.

== Second and third phase ==
Two more cult reliefs were discovered. The smaller, older one, stood below the larger one and was possibly covered by a curtain. Tommaso Gnoli suspects that there were once two mithraeums in Dura Europos. One of them was abandoned and the cult image was brought here.

The second phase of construction dates from around AD 210 to 240 and was done by Roman soldiers under the direction of Antonius Valentius. In this phase the main room was expanded to 10.90 m. It was now mainly decorated with wall paintings. In the third phase, the building was expanded and decorated. In the main room of each phase there was an altar, and in the last phase there was even a separate chancel. The two cult reliefs were also located here. The rich wall paintings of the temple originate from the second construction phase, including Mithras as hunters, two magicians and burning altars. There were over 200 short inscriptions in the building. This also includes the signature of the painter Mareos, who painted the cult room.

The whole sanctuary was dismantled after the excavation and moved to the Yale University Art Gallery. The cult niche has been reconstructed and exhibited there.

== Mareos ==
Mareos (or Mareinos) was a painter known by his signature in the mithraeum. The paintings there are dated to the middle of the third century AD. The short inscription reads: "For the salvation of Mareos, the painter (Νάμα Μαρέῳ ζωγράφῳ)". The paintings in the mithraeum are relatively well preserved, but are described by most modern authors as not of particularly high quality. He may have been a local artist with limited skills. With a foreign painter one would expect a better quality of the work. Mareos is blessed in the short inscription, using the word namais. This word is of Persian origin and is often used in the Mithras cult as a particularly solemn blessing formula in the sense of "for salvation...". So Mareos was very likely a follower of Mithraism.

== Sources ==
- Dirven, L.A. 1999 The Palmyrenes of Dura-Europos: a study of religious interaction in Roman Syria (Leiden: Brill).
- Hopkins, C, 1979 The Discovery of Dura Europos, (New Haven and London).
- Rostovtzeff, M.I., 1938. Dura-Europos and Its Art (Oxford University Press).
- Cumont, Franz; Francis, Eric David, ed., trans. (1975), "The Dura Mithraeum", in Hinnells, John R. (ed.), Mithraic studies: Proceedings of the First International Congress of Mithraic Studies, Manchester UP, pp. I.151–214.
- Francis, Eric David (1975b), "Mithraic graffiti from Dura-Europos", in Hinnells, John R. (ed.), Mithraic studies: Proceedings of the First International Congress of Mithraic Studies, Manchester UP, pp. II.424–445.
- Tommaso Gnoli: The Mithraeum of Dura-Europos, in: Ted Kaizer (Hrsg.): Religion, Society and Culture at Dura-Europos, Yale Classical Studies 38, Cambridge 2016, ISBN 978-1-107-12379-3, pp. 126–143
- M. I. Rostovtzeff, F. E. Brown, C. B. Welles: The excavations at Dura-Europos: Preliminary Report of Seventh and Eighth Season of Work 1933–1934 and 1934–1935. Yale University Press, New Haven/London/Leipzig/Prag 1939, pp. 62–134.
