= Temple of Artemis Azzanathkona =

Temple in Dura-Europos

- Location within Syria
- 34°45′03″N 40°43′38″E
- Type: Archaeological site / Sanctuary
- Periods: Hellenistic, Parthian, Roman
- Cultures: Greco-Macedonian, Syrian-Mesopotamian, Roman
- Satellite of: Seleucid Empire, Parthian Empire, Roman Empire
- Associated with: Civilian worshippers, Roman military base, Cohors XX Palmyrenorum
- Location: Dura-Europos (Block E7)
- Region: Deir ez-Zor Governorate
- Part of: Block E7, Dura-Europos

History
- Built: c. 300 B.C. (Early Hellenistic foundation; expanded over centuries)
- Built by: Local elite / Greek and Syrian benefactors
- Abandoned: 256 A.D. (destroyed during the Sasanian siege)

Site notes
- Material: Mudbrick walls on stone and plaster foundations
- Area: 31 rooms (split into W and D systems)
- Excavation dates: 1931–1933 (Yale French-American Expedition); smaller subsequent surveys 2007–2010
- Archaeologists: Clark Hopkins, Michael Rostovtzeff
- Condition: Ruined (partially destroyed and looted by ISIS during the Syrian Civil War)
- Owner: State property
- Management: Directorate-General of Antiquities and Museums (DGAM)
- Public access: No

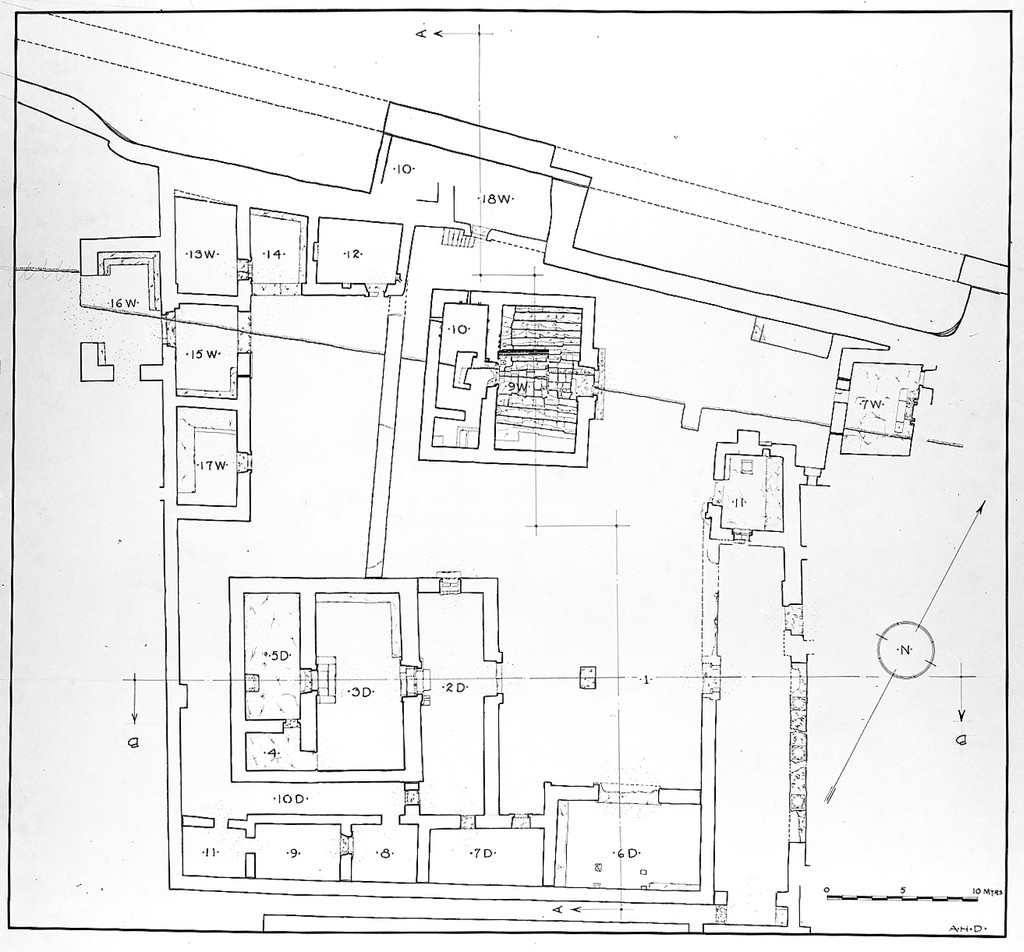
Plan of the Temple of Artemis Azzanathkona

The Temple of Artemis Azzanathkona was a sacred space located in block E7 at Dura Europos dedicated to a syncretic belief of Artemis and the Syrian deity named Azzanathkona. While established as a religious structure, portions of the temple were requisitioned by the Roman military after the Romans captured the city in 165 CE.

The Yale French-American excavation team began excavating the temple complex in 1931–32. Smaller subsequent excavations took place between 2007 and 2010.

== Discovery ==
The French-American excavation team unexpectedly discovered the Temple of Artemis Azzanathkona during the fifth season of excavations (1931–32) and excavated the temple alongside the southward adjacent structure known as the principia. New and supplementary artifacts and information from the temple continued to be discovered during the sixth season of excavations (1932–33).

== Rooms and inscriptions ==
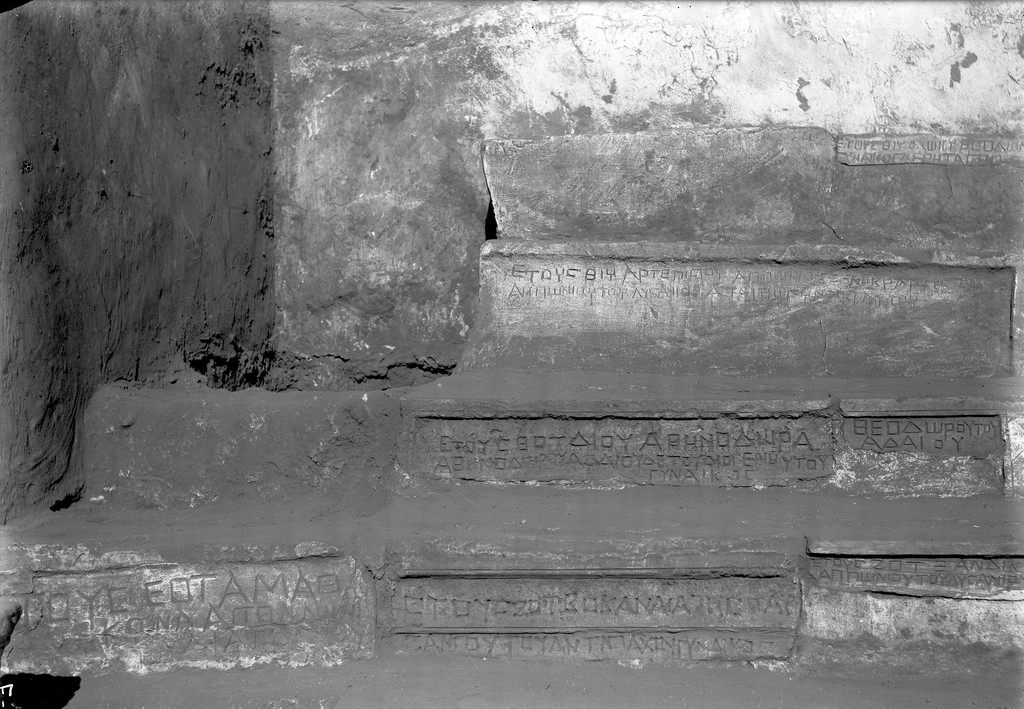
Photograph of the inscribed steps of Room W9

Archaeologist David Clark assigned a numbering system to the temple's 31 rooms, distinguished by the letter "W" for rooms along the wall line, and "D" for spaces in the interior of the block. This system likely emerged because Clark's team excavated both zones simultaneously before realizing they were the same entity. The earliest inscription is dated to c. 12–13 CE and was discovered in Room W9, also known as the salle aux gradins or stepped room for its tiered interior structure. The temple's rooms contain over 100 inscriptions in Greek and Latin, as well as a so-called "magic alphabet" in Room W14. The majority of these inscriptions bear names of individuals. In the case of the inscriptions discovered in Room W9, enough genealogical information was available that archaeologist Susan M. Hopkins was able to construct family trees of the individuals attested in the inscriptions.

== Cult ==
An inscription discovered in Room D8 (inscription 453) corroborates the dedication of the temple to "Artemis the goddess called Azzanathkona." This goddess is believed to be the syncretic deity of the Greek Artemis and the Semitic Azzanathkona, whose name is unknown outside of Dura-Europos. However, Michael Rostovtzeff claims Artemis Azzanathkona is one name the Syrian goddess Atargatis was worshipped under. The frequency of inscriptions in Room W9 bearing feminine names suggests a cult to which only women were initiated.

== Military Compound ==
Circa 160-165 CE, Roman military authorities requisitioned portions of the temple, forming a military compound in the western half. However, the compound appears to be intentionally designed to minimize interference with the temple as a functioning place of worship and gathering, leading the excavation team to believe there was continued civilian access to the temple alongside Roman military occupation. The temple became the headquarters for the Cohors XX Palmyrenorum, a Roman infantry and cavalry unit recruited from Palmyra. There were numerous papyri discovered in Room W13 documenting various activities in the life of the Cohort, thus becoming of great value for the study of Roman military organization in this period. When evidence of military presence in the temple was uncovered, excavators Clark Hopkins, Henry T. Rowell, and Rostovtzeff speculated that the principia served as headquarters for the Roman legionaries, while the Temple of Artemis Azzanathkona served as the headquarters for the auxiliaries. Likely in preparation for the final siege in 256, mud brick walls were erected through rooms to strengthen the ramparts. The temple shows substantial evidence of destruction by fire, as the floor of Room W9 was covered with ashes upon discovery and fire marked the walls of many rooms.

== Sources ==
- James, Simon (2019). The Roman Military Base at Dura-Europos, Syria. Oxford: Oxford University Press. pp. 70–78. ISBN 978-0-19-874356-9.
- Rostovtzeff, M. I. (1934). The excavations at Dura-Europos: Preliminary Report of Fifth Season of Work 1931-1932. New Haven/London/Leipzig/Prague: Yale University Press. pp. 131–180, 295–303. OCLC 1070324713.
- Rostovtzeff, M. I.; Bellinger, A. R.; Hopkins, C.; Welles, C. B. (1936). The excavations at Dura-Europos: Preliminary Report of Sixth Season of Work 1932-1933. New Haven/London/Leipzig/Prague: Yale University Press. pp. 482-499. OCLC 884041325.
