= Jotham Johnson =

American archaeologist (1905-1967)

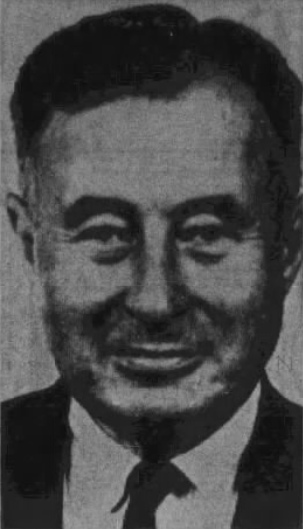
- Born: October 21, 1905; Newark, New Jersey, US
- Died: February 8, 1967 (aged 61); New York City, US
- Education: Princeton University BA (1926), University of Pennsylvania PhD in Greek (1926)
- Occupations: Archaeologist, author, professor
- Years active: 1926-1967
- Known for: Mediterranean archaeology and calendars

Jotham Johnson (October 21, 1905 – February 8, 1967) was an American classical archaeologist in Mediterranean archaeology. He was educated at Princeton University (1926) and the University of Pennsylvania, where he received his doctorate in 1931. He taught at the University of Pittsburgh and then joined the faculty of New York University. He was the chairman of classics at the time of his death.

He was involved in archaeological fieldwork at the site of Dura Europos in Syria. Later, he became involved in the excavations at the site of Minturnae in Italy, under the auspices of the University of Pennsylvania. Johnson conducted fieldwork at Aphrodisias in the early 1960s. In 1961, he became president of the Archaeological Institute of America, where he served until 1964. Johnson was also the first editor of the Institute's magazine Archaeology.

== Early life and education ==
Jotham Johnson was born October 21, 1905 in Newark, New Jersey to physician Jotham Clarke Johnson and Edith Jennette Compson Johnson. Older sister Katharine (born 1896) was an editor for Vogue magazine in Paris and then "special writer" for Look Magazine until just before she died in 1955.

Johnson graduated from Princeton University in 1926 and transferred to the American School of Classical Studies at Athens and became a fellow in 1927. He received his PhD in Greek from the University of Pennsylvania. and was "field director of the University of Pennsylvania Museum excavations at Minturno, Italy" from 1931 to 1934. He served in the Mediterranean "as a lieutenant commander in the Naval Reserve in 1942-45".

== Career ==
In 1946, Johnson became a professor at New York University and was "named chairman of the classics department in 1948 ... and of the entire university in 1958". In 1951-1952, he became the Norton Lecturer and "was a research scholar at the University of Rome." He served as the President of the Archaeological Institute of America (AIA) from 1961-1964.

Johnson produced a CBS three-day-a-week show for a New York audience called "Sunrise Semester - Classical Civilization - Mediterranean Archaeology" in 1961. Also, he was host of the West German television program "Footsteps to the Past".

== Archaeologist ==
His expertise was Mediterranean archaeology and primitive time-reckoning. With the use of the planetarium in Pittsburgh in 1940, he was able to work out the precise date that the ancient Egyptians used as their starting date of their calendar, June 18, 3,251 B.C.E.. He ruined plans for Columbia University in 1956 who had been planning the 2,000th anniversary of the Ides of March when he notified them that it would only be the 1,999th anniversary as "'March 15, 1 B.C. to March 15 1 A.D. equals one year', he pointed out that there was no zero year."

The University of Pennsylvania Museum, led by Johnson, excavated Minturnae and collected over "100 pieces of sculpture" from 1931-1933. The majority of the sculptures were left in Italy, where "many were misplaced or lost in the course of World War II."

Discovered scratched into a plaster wall of a private home in Dura-Europos Johnson found a sketch of the zodiac and words in Greek. He managed to read that this was the horoscope of an infant child provided by an astrologer based on the date of birth of the baby. When Johnson returned to Yale, he took his work to the astronomy department, which used the sketches of the planets and determined that the child had been born July 3, 176 C.E. at about 10pm.

Johnson believed that because of looting, "[T]he greatest archeological discovers ... will be made underwater". Although many shipwrecks held common cargoes of amphora jugs, occasionally a ship "had a cargo of some of the finest marble and bronze statuary of the ancient world, bound for the villas and public buildings of Rome. ... They await us in almost mint condition."

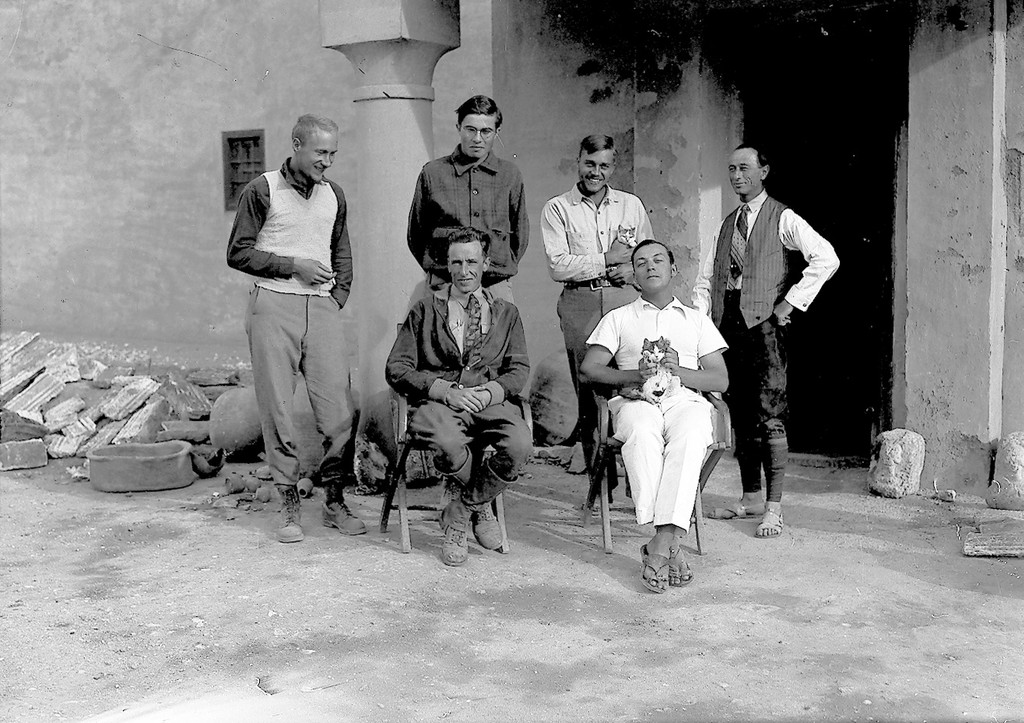
Dura-Europos unknown year - Jotham Johnson (second from left standing) with Henry F. Pearson (standing holding kitten) and Clark Hopkins (sitting without kitten)

== Works ==
Served as a editor for New Century Classical Handbook, Classical Weekly, Archaeological Newsletter, Archaeology and Horizon.

- [dissertation] Dura studies (Roma, Tip. ditta f.lli Pallotta, 1931).
- 1935. Excavations at Minturnae. Philadelphia: University Museum by the University of Pennsylvania Press.
- 1933. Excavations at Minturnae, II. Inscriptions, Part I, Republican Magistri. Philadelphia: University Museum by the University of Pennsylvania Press.

== Professional organizations and associations ==
- American Philological Association (APA)
- Classical Association of the Atlantic States
- New York Classical Club
- Vergilian Society

== Personal life ==
Johnson was married to Sarah Jean Coates in 1941, and they had one child, Jotham Johnson Jr., who died in 2022.

From 1954-56, Johnson wrote a personal column called "For the Record," which was published in many publications across the United States. Some articles were about archaeology news, his opinion of the future of archaeology, stories he had heard, politics and often his belief that college campuses should challenge the students' opinions they brought with them as Freshmen. Free discussion of topics and unpopular opinions should be offered. He encouraged professors to take an opposite opinion of a subject during a discussion, "the more feelings they hurt, the longer the discussions will be remembered", and "If a college education stands for anything, it means that the graduate has been taught to do his own thinking and to reject canned or predigested ideas."

Johnson died of a heart attack during a meeting of department heads on Washington Square. He was 61 years old.

Four generations of Johnson men graduated from Princeton University, starting with Jotham Clarke Johnson M.D., class of 1879, Jotham Johnson, class of 1926, son Jotham Johnson Jr, class of 1964, and Jotham Thomas Johnson in the class of 2000.
