= Susan M. Hopkins =

American archaeologist

- Born: Susan Mary Sullivan; 1900
- Died: 1969 (aged 68–69)
- Known for: Excavations at Dura Europos

Academic background
- Education: University of Wisconsin

Academic work
- Discipline: Archaeology

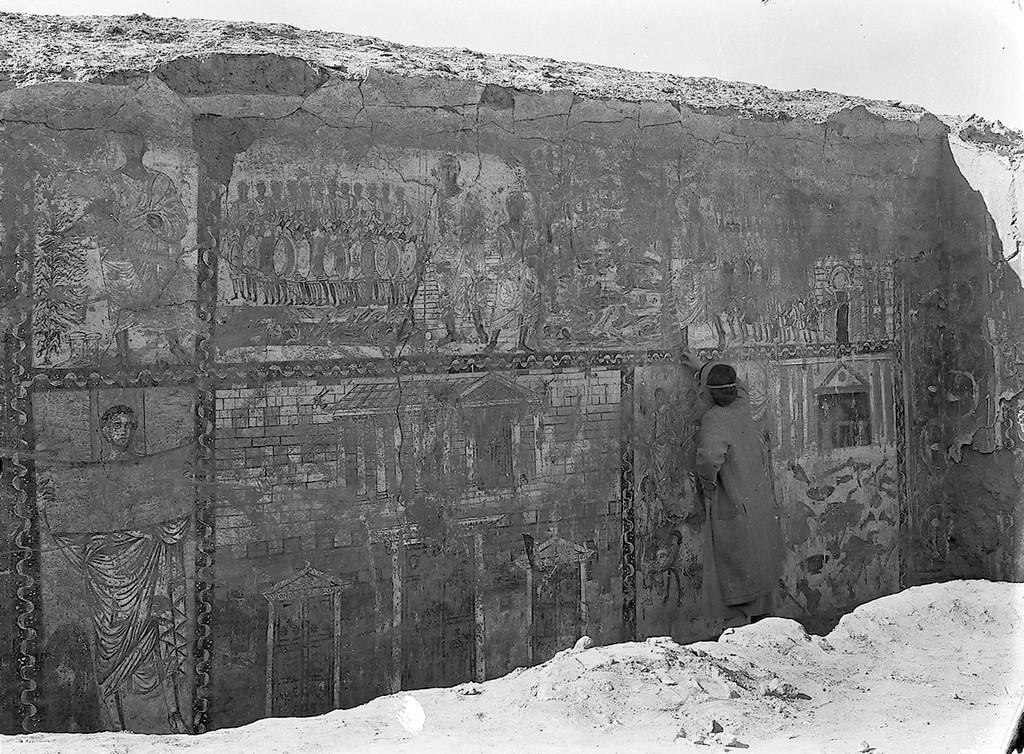
Photograph of Susan M. Hopkins cleaning synagogue in Dura-Europos 1932-1933

Susan M. Hopkins (1900–1969) was an American archaeologist known for her work on the excavations at Dura-Europos.

== Biography ==
Hopkins was born in 1900 in Eau Claire, Wisconsin. She studied at Cedar Falls Teachers College in Iowa and the University of South Dakota before transferring to the University of Wisconsin-Madison, where she graduated in 1923 with a thesis on 'Social Origins in Lucretius'. Subsequently she was appointed as a scholar in Classics for 1924-25 and assistant in Classics for the year 1925-26. In 1926 she married the archaeologist Clark Hopkins and moved with him to New Haven, CT, where she took classes at Yale University with Michael Rostovtzeff. In the summer of 1928 Hopkins and her husband attended the summer schools of the American Academy in Rome and the American School of Classical Studies at Athens, and afterwards joined an excavation at Olynthus, where Hopkins catalogued finds, in particular the terracottas.

== Archaeology at Dura-Europos ==
Susan M Hopkins is one of the archaeologists involved in the excavations at Dura-Europos. Hopkins was part of the French-American excavations at Dura-Europos alongside her husband Clark Hopkins, who was the assistant director for second season in 1928-29 and field director from 1931-35. She was the first and only woman archeologist to bring her child to the Middle East at that time and she was a caretaker of her husband and her daughter. She also took care of the other foreign excavators who were at the site as a whole because she was tasked with the responsibility of taking care of house hold duties. Hopkins was responsible for housekeeping, overseeing the kitchen and supplies, and organizing staff housing, as well as looking after her daughter, Mary Sue, who joined her parents on site from 1932. Hopkins also was sometimes tasked with cleaning different discoveries within the excavation and with cataloguing terracottas. In a letter to her sister Hopkins writes "I try to catalog the terracottas, which are positively the most fascinating things."

This photo features Susan Hopkins cleaning the west wall Synagogue on the north side sometime between 1932-1933. Photograph of Susan M. Hopkins cleaning Synagogue in Dura-Europos between 1932-1933 Her catalogues of small finds during the fifth to tenth seasons of the excavation have been described as “the most complete and most accurate record of the artifacts of Dura that exists”. She contributed to the study of coins, pottery and inscriptions at the site, including study of the Greek inscriptions from the Temple of Artemis Azzanathkona. Susan Hopkins' reports can be found in the preliminary excavation reports within the second season of work between October 1928-April 1929. Her contributions to the report are titled "Stamped and Scratched Pottery" and "Coins." Susan Hopkins also used her skill in Greek, Latin and epigraphy to further the results of the excavation.

Letters written by Hopkins to friends and family members (specifically her sister and her parents) during the excavations, describing Hopkins' work, day-to-day life at the excavations and her impressions of her travels around Europe and the Middle East were collected in a volume edited by Norma Goldman and Bernard Goldman, published in 2011. In these letters Susan M. Hopkins describes Dura-Europos as being very cold at night and extremely hot in the day. She also describes the challenges that were faced from excavating in a remote area without any fundamental knowledge of the native language. Hopkins writes, "And if we survive January during which they say it freezes everyday, we won't need a house." During the time of the excavation they were also within a war zone over disputed territory which made their excavation more difficult. To illustrate this concern to her family Hopkins writes, "I am beginning to be much worried about the food. For all civilized things we are dependent on the French Military stores and the one in Deir has had, literally, nothing for two weeks because their supplies were stopped up the Euphrates on the Turkish border."

Susan Hopkins also describes feeling lonely in her letters to her family; she was the only woman at the excavation site for a majority of the time that she was there. However, she found solace reading books by Gertrude Bell, an influential archeologist who also worked within the Middle East. Gertrude Bell was known for her diplomatic skills in the middle east because of her knowledge of Arabic, which was a pursuit of Hopkins as well.
