= Siege of Dura-Europos (256) =

Sasanian siege of Roman city (256)

Siege of Dura Europos (256)
- Part of Shapur I's second Roman campaign
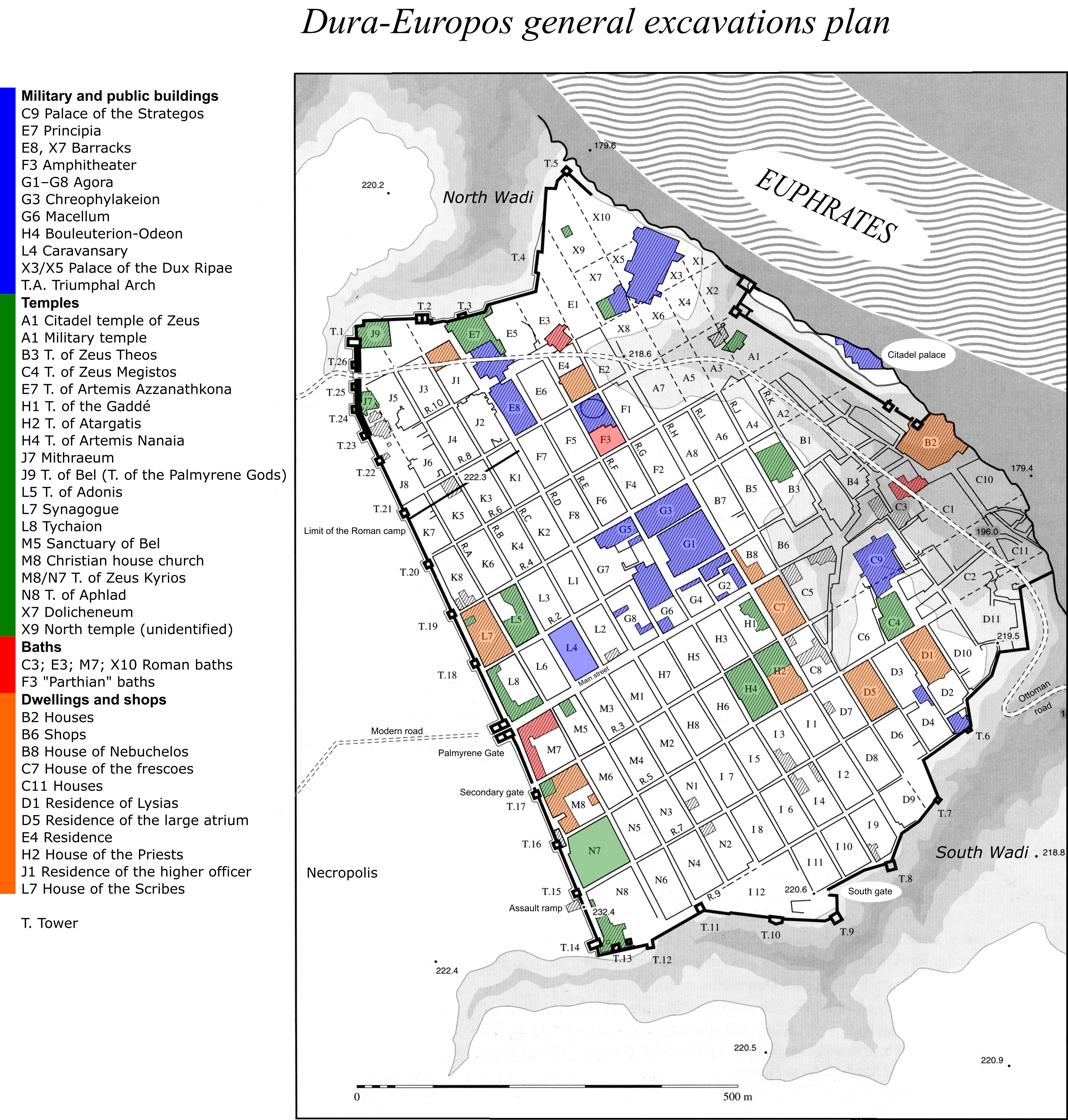
- Dura-Europos general excavations plan, assault ramp is between 14th and 15th towers
Date	256 AD
Location	Dura-Europos, Roman Empire (present-day Syria)
Result	Sasanian victory

Belligerents
Sassanian Empire	Roman Empire

Commanders and leaders
Shapur I	Unknown

Units involved
	Legio IV Scythica; Legio III Cyrenaica; Legio XVI Flavia Firma; Cohors XX Palmyrenorum; Cohors II Paphlagonum Gallia; Cohors II Equestris

Strength
23,000	Unknown

The siege of Dura Europos took place when the Sasanians under Shapur I besieged the Roman city of Dura-Europos in 256 after capturing Antioch.

Dura-Europos was an important trading center in Roman Syria. It may or may not be the same as the "Doura" recorded in Shapur I's inscriptions. The town was in Sasanian hands for some time after its fall, and was later abandoned. Intact archaeological evidences at Dura provide details of the Roman presence there, and the dramatic course of the siege. The garrison was determined to resist the siege, and the Sasanians employed a variety of siege warfare techniques to defeat them. Archaeological evidences suggest that the garrison at Dura-Europos was mixed, composed of Cohors XX Palmyrenorum (which is known more than the others), vexillations from Legio IV Scythica Valeriana Galliena, III Cyrenaica, XVI Flavia Firma, and other cohorts, including Cohors II Paphlagonum Galliana Volusiana and possibly Cohors II Equestris. The relationship between these forces are uncertain. XX Palmyrenorum was certainly based in Dura-Europos, and may have been an "inferior" contingent of the garrison relative to the legionaries. The numbers of the legionaries are unknown.

== Use of chemical weapons ==
The siege was notable for the early use of chemical weapons by the attacking Persian army. During the siege the attackers dug several underground shaft mines under the city walls. The Romans dug tunnels to reach the mines and fight the diggers underground. In one such tunnel, when the Romans broke through into the Sasanian tunnel the tunnelers ignited a mixture of sulfur and pitch, producing a cloud of sulfur dioxide, which killed twenty Roman soldiers, one of which was carrying a coin dated 256, allowing the dating of the siege. Archaeologists excavated the scene in the 1930s. In 2009 tests showed the presence of sulfur dioxide inside the tunnel. In 2020, a group of chemistry students in Foxborough, Massachusetts used chemical analysis of the samples in the tunnel compared with the composition of bitumen and deduced that methane was also likely a by-product of the attack.

== Gallery ==
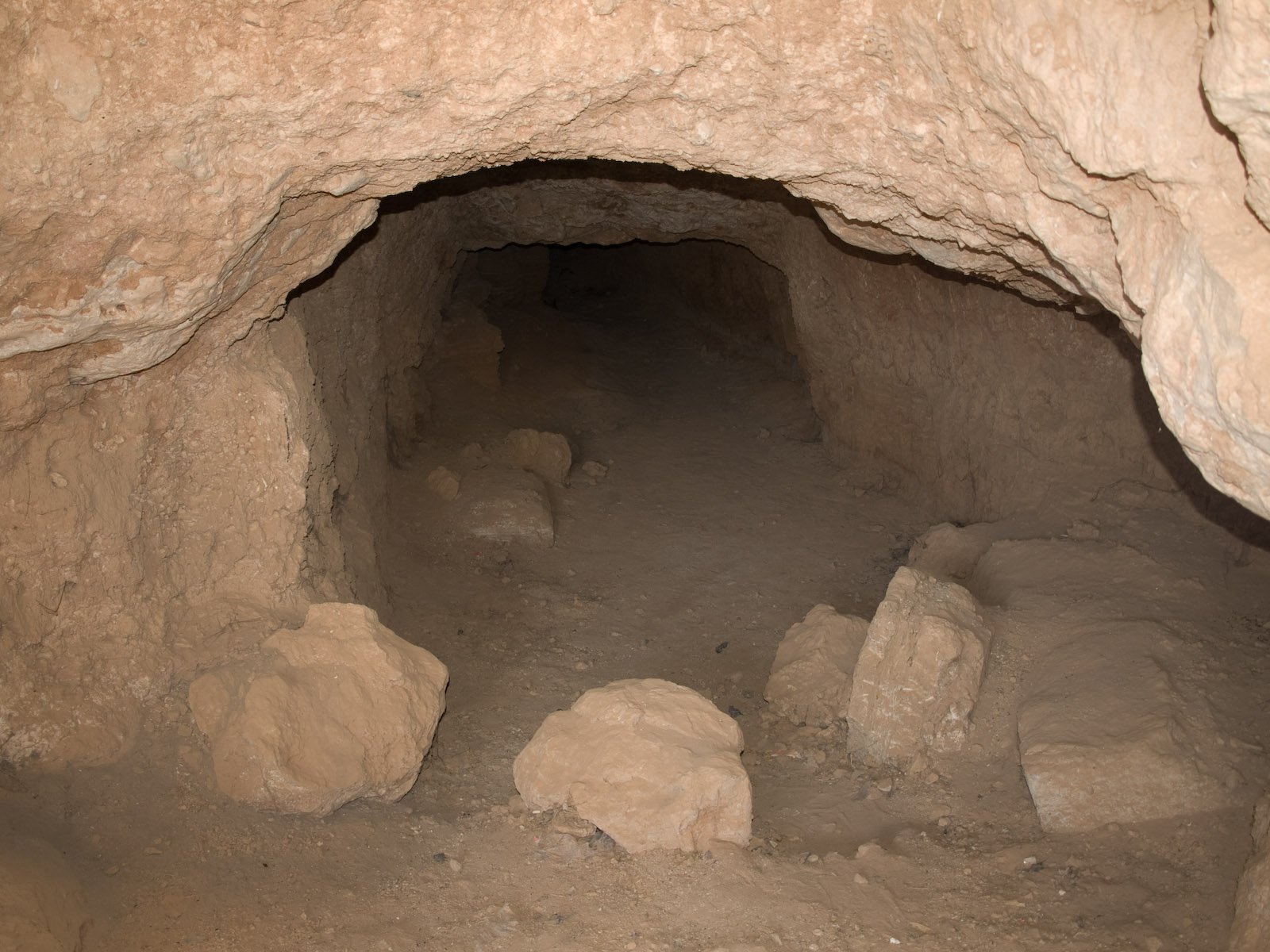
Tunnels made by the Sasanians

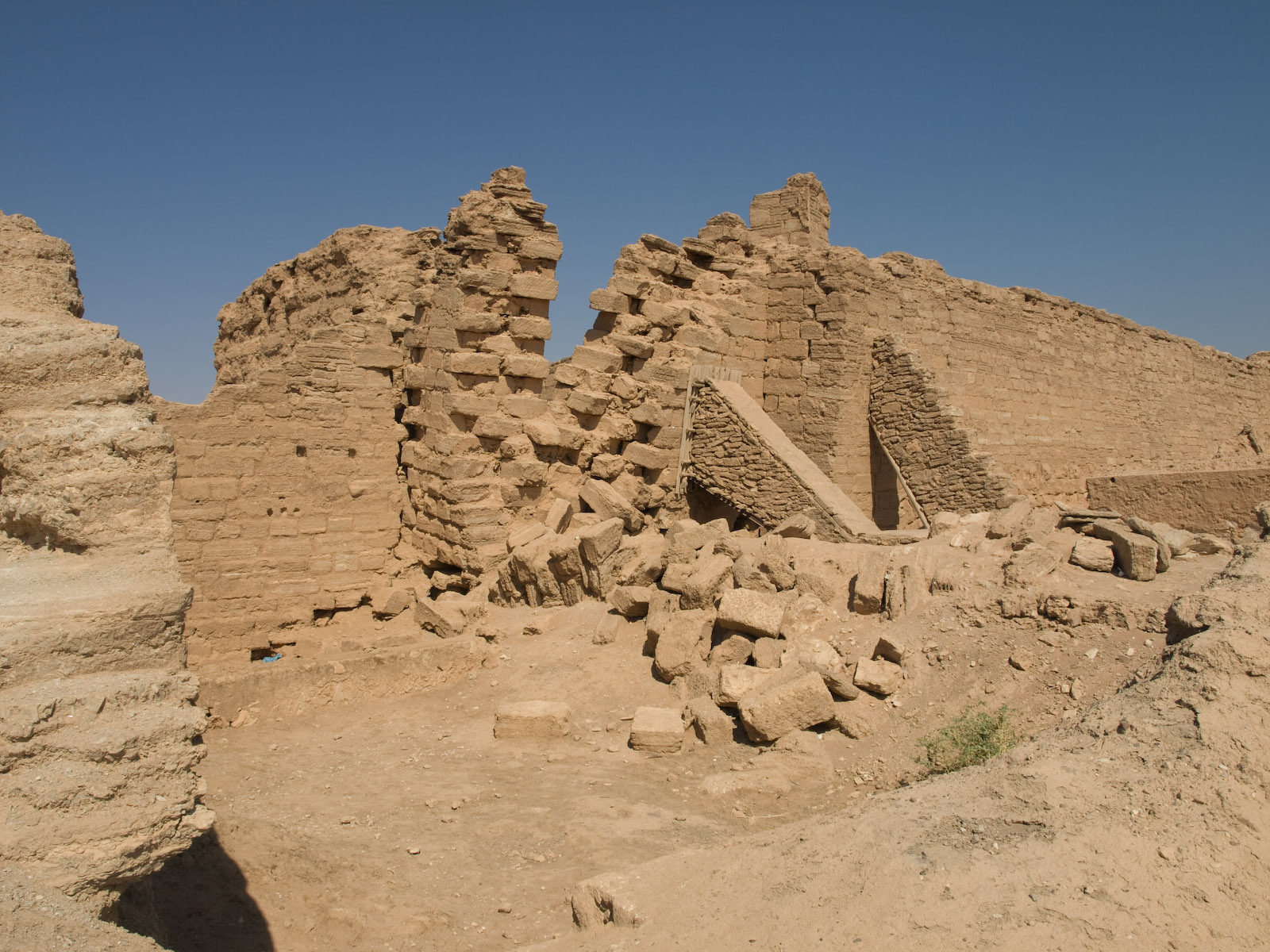
Ruins of the city walls

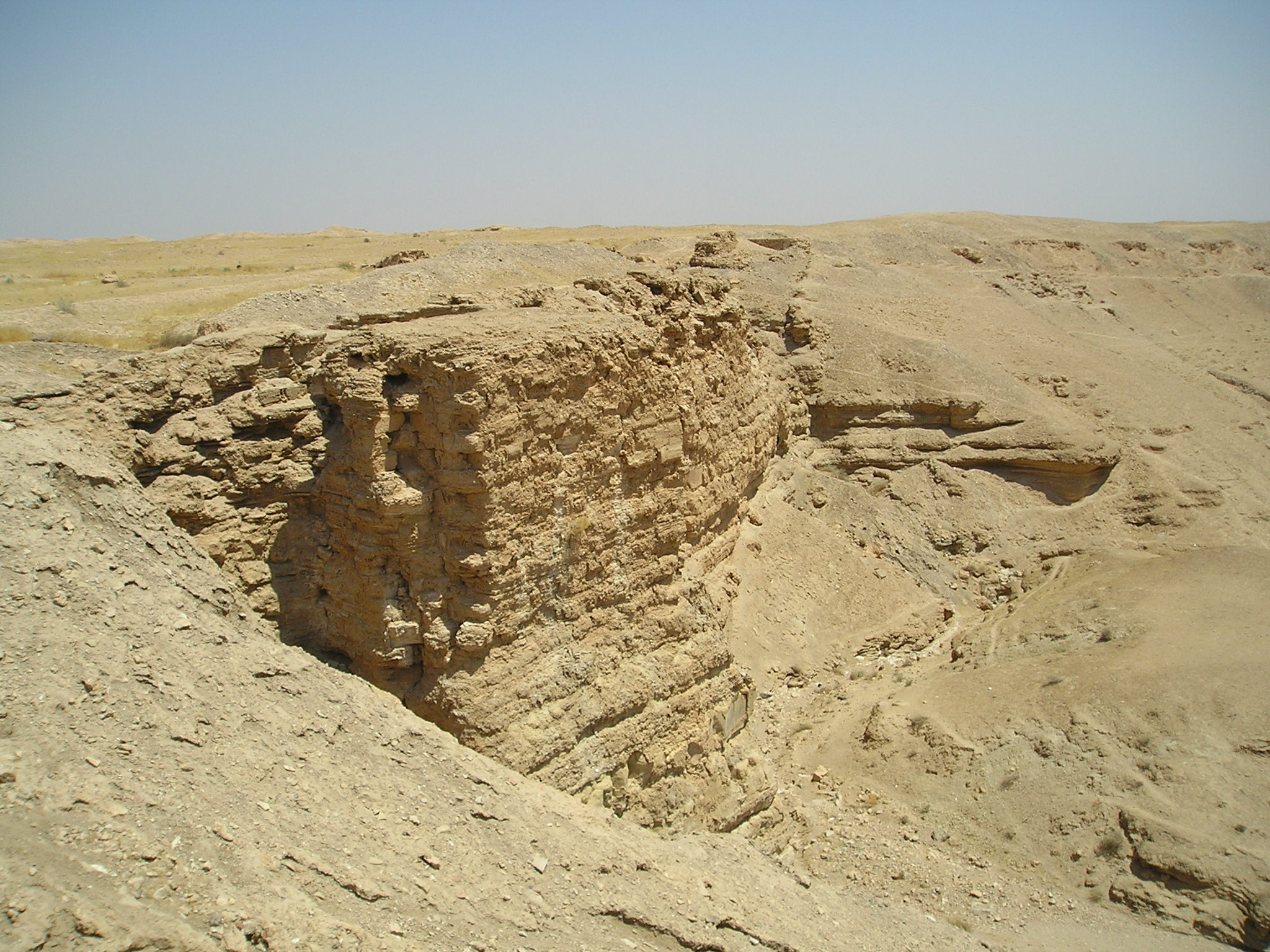
The southern wall. One of the Sasanian assaults was performed against this side of the walls

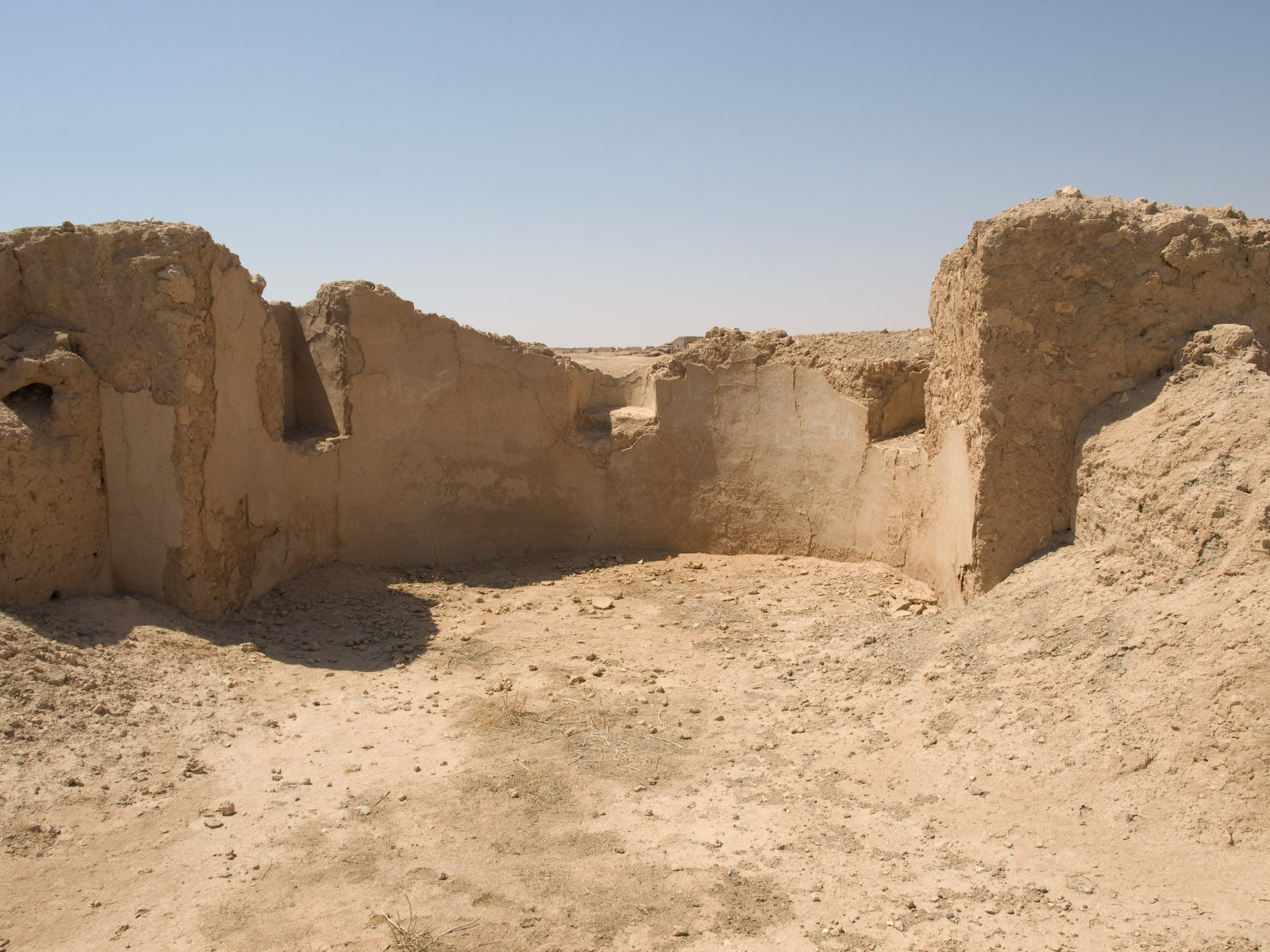
The citadel

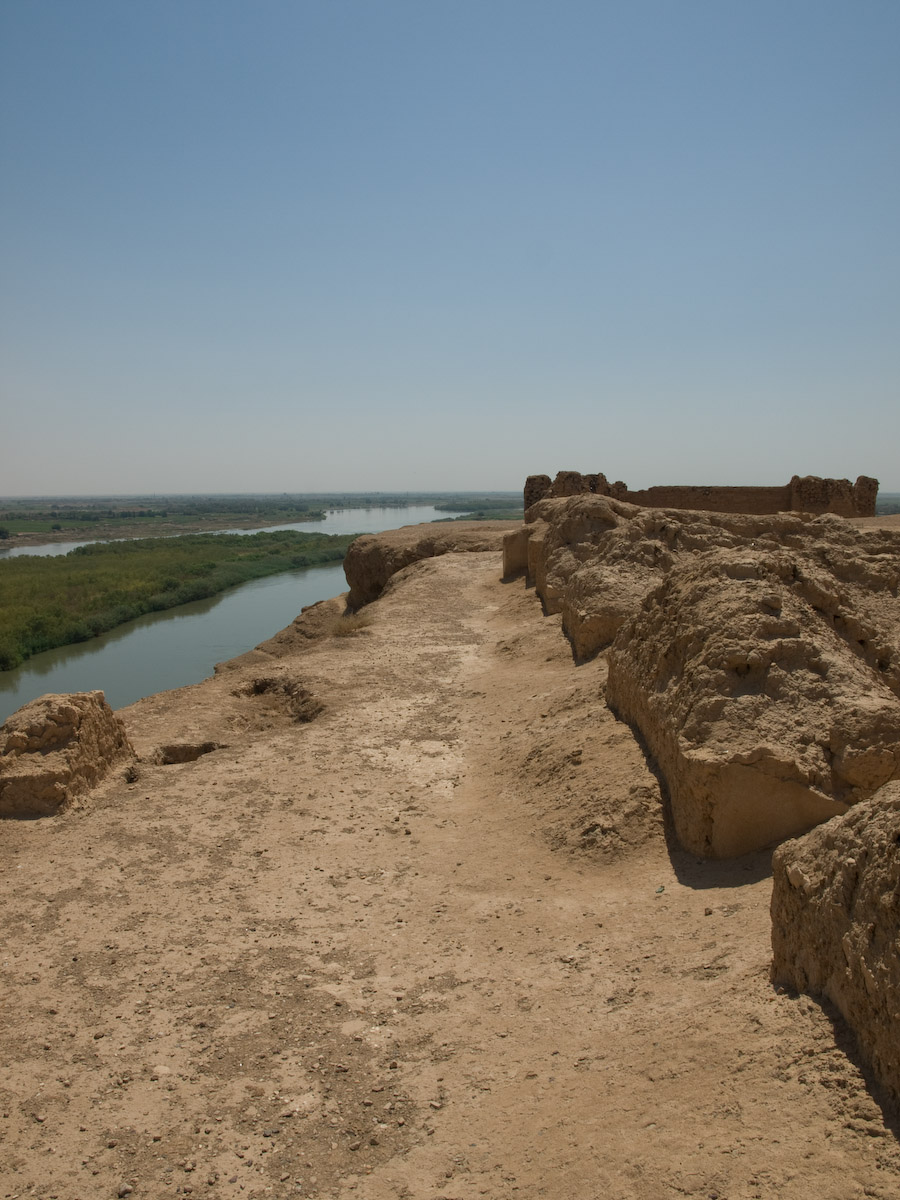
The citadel

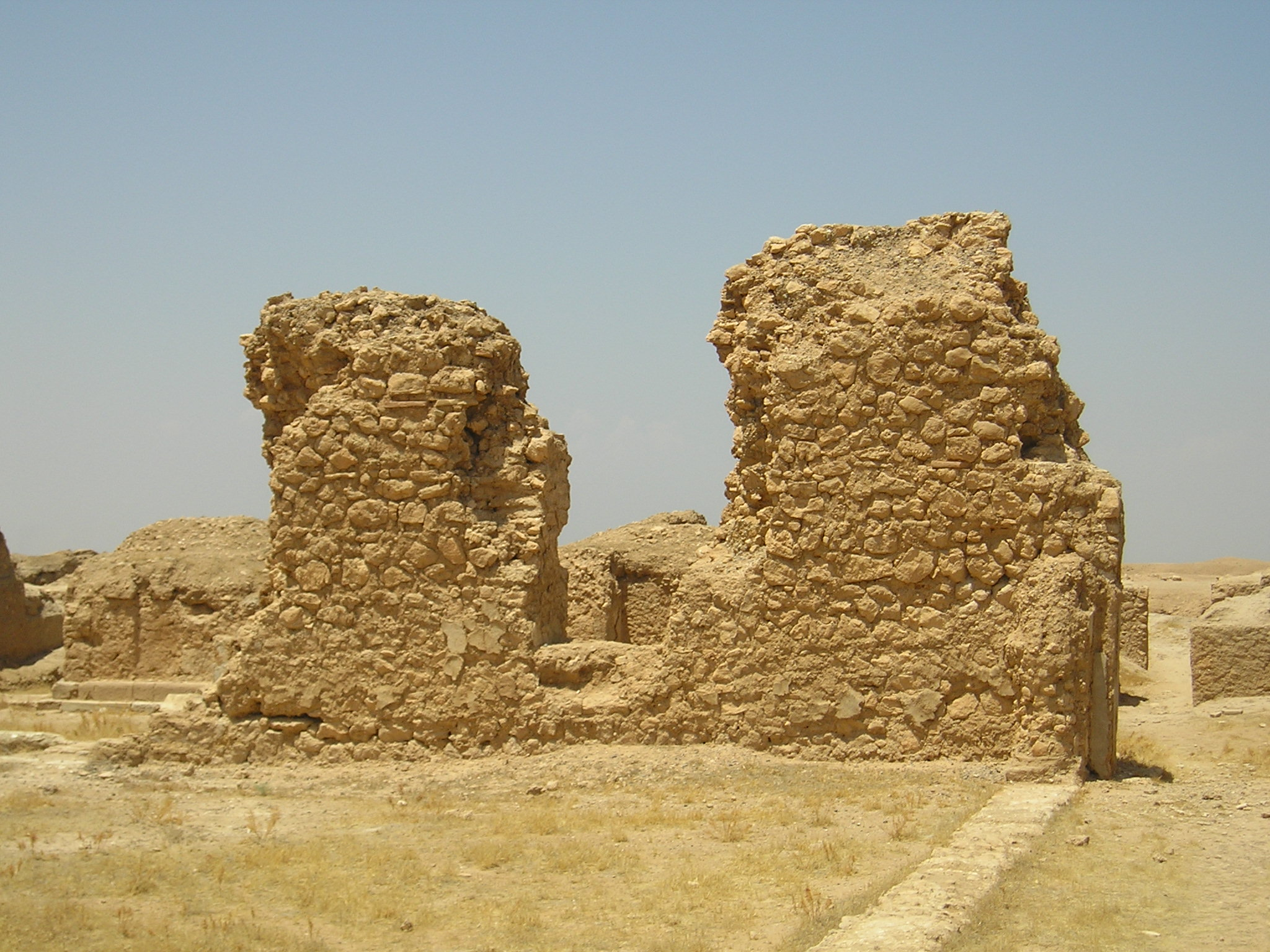
The praetorium, the headquarters of the legionaries
