= Cohors XX Palmyrenorum =

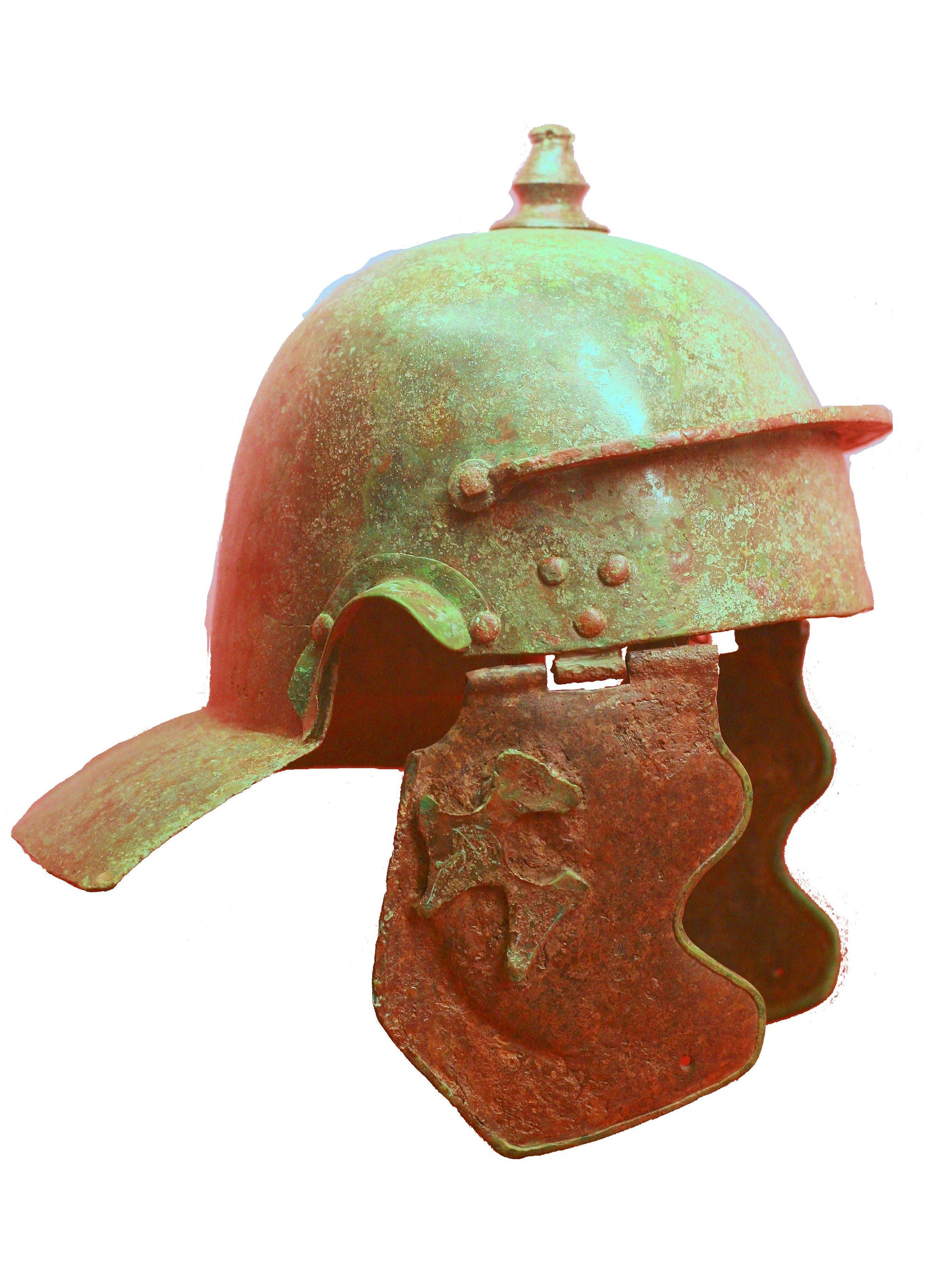
- Roman infantry helmet (late 1st century)
- Active: Late 2nd century AD to at least c. 257 AD
- Country: Roman Empire
- Type: Roman auxiliary cohort
- Role: infantry/cavalry
- Size: 1,040 men (800 infantry, 240 cavalry)
- Garrison/HQ: Dura-Europos

The Cohors XX Palmyrenorum ("20th Cohort of Palmyrenes") was an auxiliary cohort of the Roman Imperial army. It was a cohors equitata milliaria, mixed infantry and cavalry regiment, originally recruited from the inhabitants of Palmyra in Roman Syria. There were also a small number (32–36) of dromedarii forces attached to the infantry.

The unit was probably raised in the late 2nd century, when Palmyra became part of the Roman Empire. At first they served in the province of Dacia. In the early 3rd century they were stationed in Dura-Europos. The headquarters of the Cohors XX Palmyrenorum was the Temple of Artemis Azzanathkona aside the Praetorium.

== See also ==
- Feriale Duranum, a standard calendar of religious observances for the military issued to this cohort
- List of Roman auxiliary regiments

== Bibliography ==
- Robert O. Fink: The Cohors XX Palmyrenorum, a Cohors Equitata Miliaria. In: Transactions and Proceedings of the American Philological Association. Vol. 78, 1947. pp. 159–170.
- Nigel Pollard: Soldiers, Cities, and Civilians in Roman Syria. University of Michigan Press, 2000, ISBN 978-0472111558
