= Clark Hopkins =

American archaeologist (1895–1976)

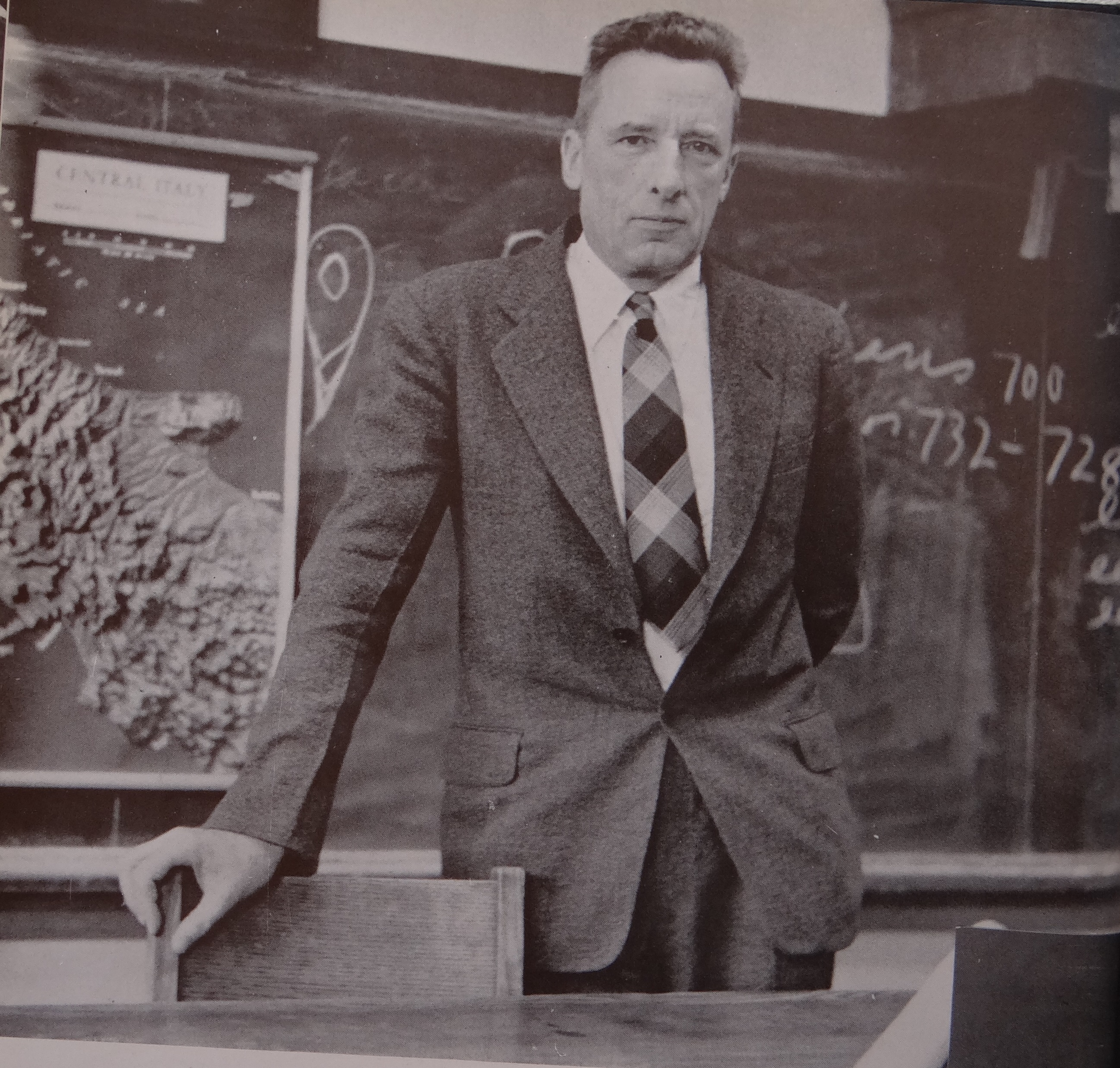
- Clark Hopkins from the 1952 Michiganensian
- Born: September 16, 1895; New York City, US
- Died: 1976 (aged 80–81)
- Known for: Excavations of Dura-Europos
- Scientific career
- Fields: Archaeology
- Institutions: University of Michigan
- Doctoral advisor: Michael Rostovtzeff

Clark Hopkins (New York City, 16 September 1895 – 1976) was an American archaeologist. During the 1930s he led the joint French-American excavations at Dura Europos. In later years he was professor of art and archeology at the University of Michigan.

== Biography ==
Clark Hopkins was a son of Edward Washburn Hopkins, who was a Professor of Sanskrit and Comparative Philology at Yale University. Hopkins studied at Yale (A.B., 1917), Oxford (Rhodes Scholar, 1919-1921; A.B., 1921 and A.M., 1926) and the University of Wisconsin (Ph.D., 1924).

In 1926 Clark Hopkins married the archaeologist Susan M. Hopkins and they moved New Haven, CT. In the summer of 1928 both Susan and Clark Hopkins attended the summer schools of the American Academy in Rome and the American School of Classical Studies at Athens, and afterwards joined an excavation at Olynthus.

He taught at Rice Institute, Yale and the University of Michigan. He studied at Athens in 1927-1928, and in 1928-1929 was an Assistant Director of Yale's excavations at Dura-Europos. In 1931-1935 he was Field Director of excavations there. Hopkins was also a reserve officer of the U. S. Army; he served in the World War I as a 2nd Lieutenant of Infantry, and in the World War II as a Major in the Sixth Service Command's Training Division. Later he was a Professor of Classical Art and Archaeology at the University of Michigan.

Clark Hopkins is best known for his work at Doura Europos, where he was excavation director in 1932-1933 when the Franco-American mission made the extraordinary discovery of the synagogue. He left the detailed account of this discovery that would revolutionize the conceptions of Jewish and Christian art in several articles and in a posthumous work, The Discovery of Dura-Europos, published in 1979:

It was like a dream! In the endless space of the clear blue sky and the empty gray desert, a miracle occurred, an oasis of paintings arose from the monotonous earth.

Hopkins co-authored the preliminary excavation report, the final report was published in 1956 by Carl Herman Kraeling.

Clark Hopkins also led the last excavation campaign in Seleucia, Iraq on behalf of the University of Michigan.

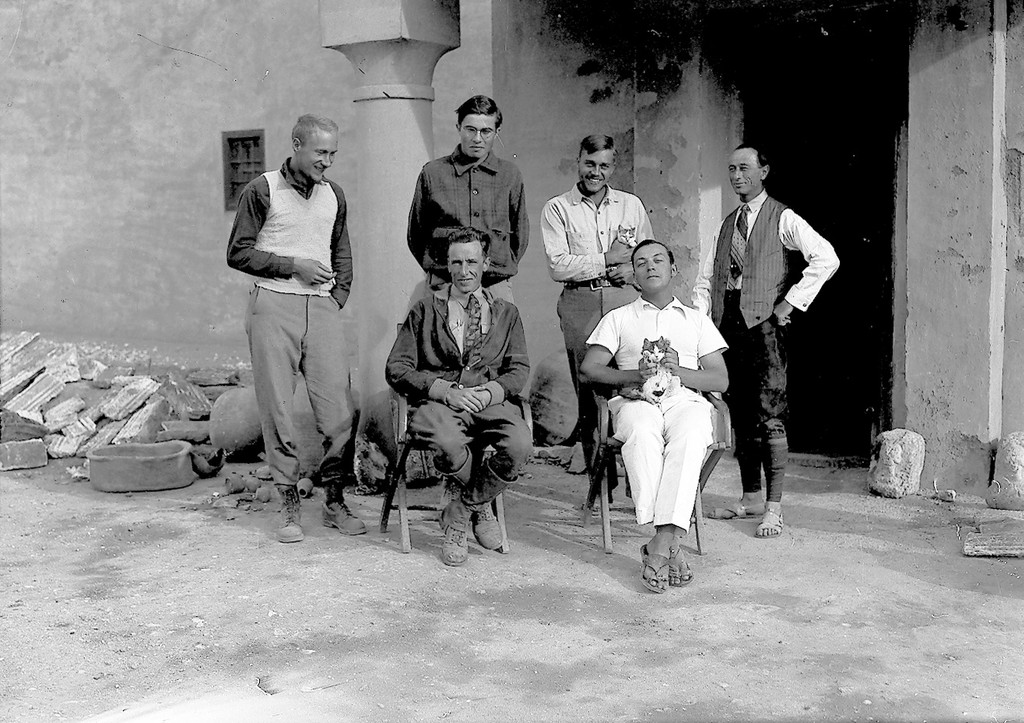
Dura-Europos unknown year - Jotham Johnson (second from left standing) with Henry F. Pearson (standing holding kitten) and Clark Hopkins (sitting without kitten)

== Bibliography ==
- Christian Church at Dura-Europos, New Haven, 1934.
- The Excavations at Dura-Europos. Preliminary Reports. Sixth Season, 1932–1933. Codirigé avec M. I. Rostovtzeff, A. R. Bellinger, and C. B. Wells. New Haven, 1936.
- Introduction to Classical Archaeology: Crete and Greece. Ann Arbor, 1950.
- Topography and Architecture of Seleucia on the Tigris. Ann Arbor, 1972.
- The Discovery of Dura-Europos. New Haven, 1979.
