= Temple of Zeus =

Temple of Zeus may refer to:

== Greece ==
- Temple of Zeus, Olympia
- Temple of Olympian Zeus, Athens
- Sanctuary of Zeus Polieus, Athens

== Italy ==
- Temple of Olympian Zeus, Agrigento
- Temple G, Selinunte

== Libya ==
- Temple of Zeus, Cyrene

== Syria ==
- Temple of Zeus Kyrios, Dura-Europos
- Temple of Zeus Megistos, Dura-Europos
- Temple of Zeus Theos, Dura-Europos
- Temple of Zeus Hypsistos, Al-Dumayr
