= Dura-Europos synagogue =

Ancient synagogue in Syria

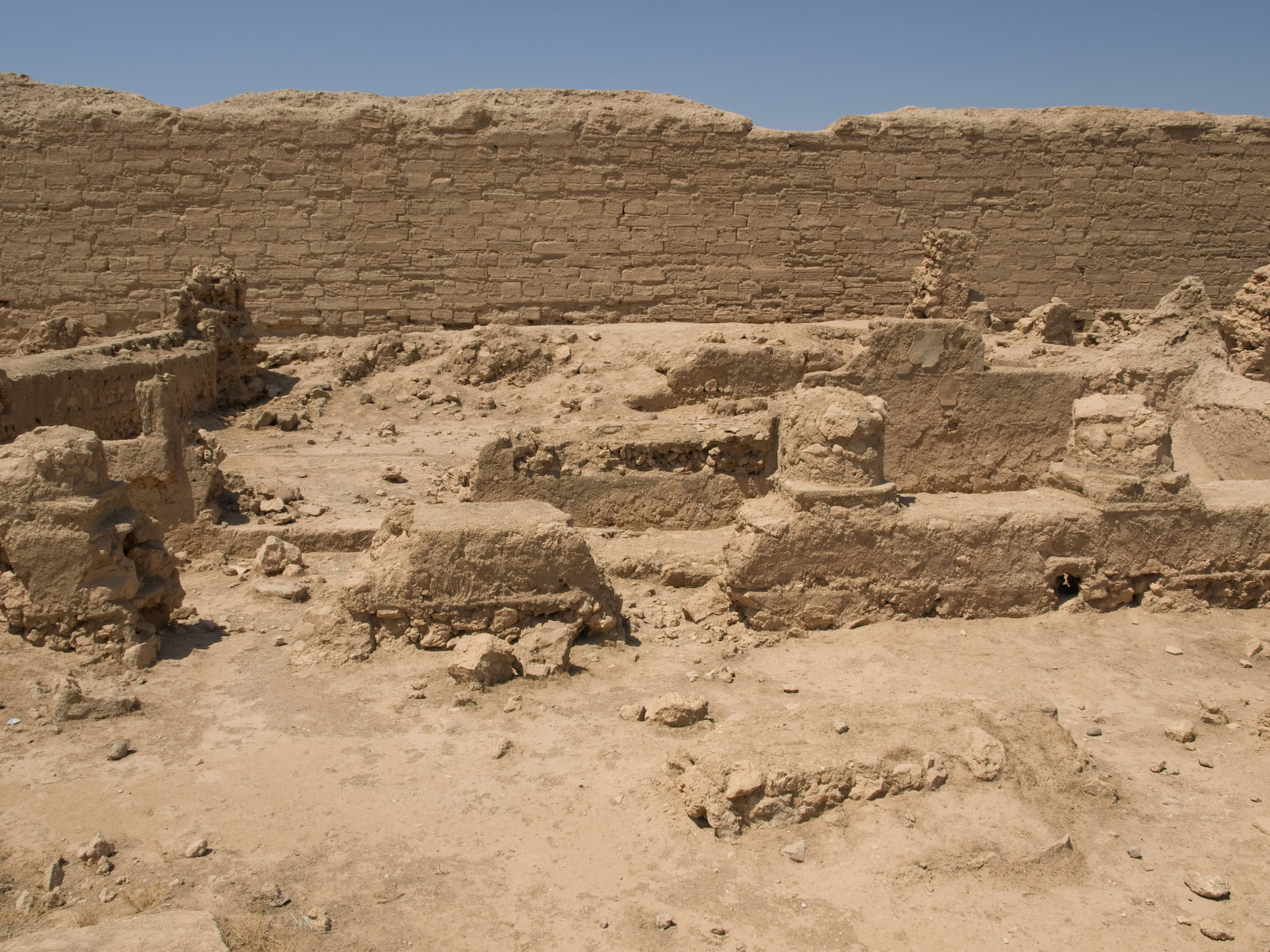
- Courtyard, western porch and prayer hall

- Location of the ancient former synagogue in Syria

Religion
- Affiliation: Judaism
- Ecclesiastical or organisational status: Ancient synagogue; Archaeological site
- Status: Destroyed

Location
- Location: Dura-Europos, Deir ez-Zor Governorate
- Country: Syria
- Coordinates: 34°44′51″N 40°43′38″E

Architecture
- Completed: c. 244 CE
- Destroyed: c. 2014 during the Syrian Civil War
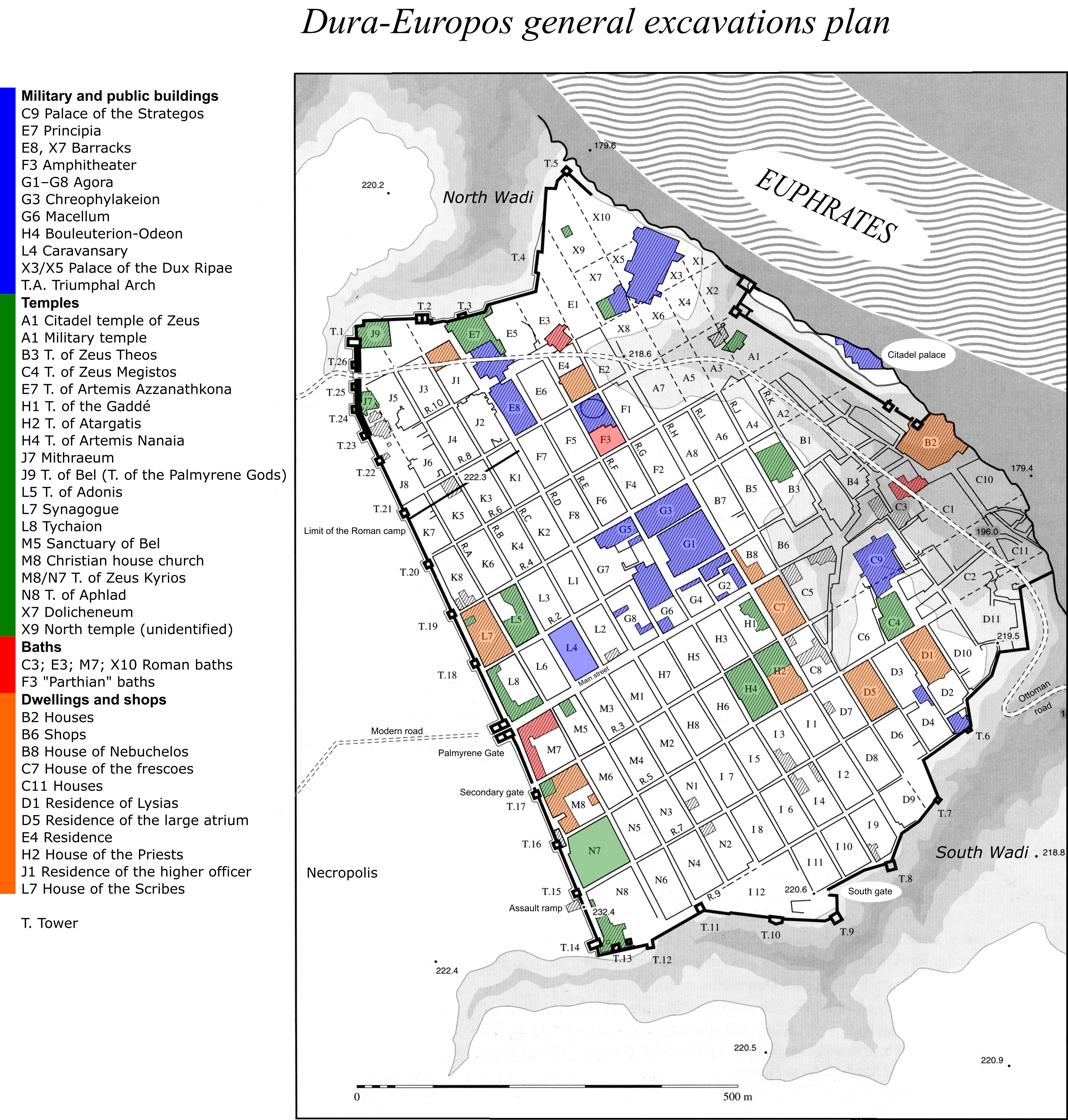
- Map of Dura Europos and location of the former synagogue in islet L7.
- Periods: Classical antiquity
- Cultures: Jewish, Parthian, Sassanid

History
- Abandoned: 256–257 CE

Site notes
- Discovered: 1932

The Dura-Europos synagogue was an ancient Jewish synagogue discovered in 1932 at Dura-Europos, Syria. The synagogue contained a forecourt and house of assembly with painted walls depicting people and animals, and a Torah shrine in the western wall facing Jerusalem. It was built backing on to the city wall, which was important in its survival. The last phase of construction was dated by an Aramaic inscription to 244 CE, placing it among just a handful of synagogues from antiquity discovered and unequivocally identified by archaeologists. It was unique among the many ancient synagogues that have emerged from archaeological excavations as the structure was preserved virtually intact, and it had extensive figurative wall-paintings, which in 1932 still came as a considerable surprise to scholars. The synagogue remains, including the murals, are now preserved in the National Museum of Damascus.

Dura-Europos was a small garrison and trading city on the river Euphrates, and usually on the frontier between the Eastern Roman Empire and the Parthian and finally the Sassanid Empires of Persia. It changed hands at various points but was Roman from 165 AD. Before the final Persian destruction of the town in 256–257 AD, parts of the synagogue which abutted the main city wall were apparently requisitioned and filled with sand as a defensive measure. The city was abandoned after its fall and never resettled, and the lower walls of the rooms remained buried and largely intact until excavated. The short measure of time during which it was used ensured that it would have limited impact upon Jewish or Christian art. The excavations also discovered very important wall-paintings from places of worship of Christianity at the Dura-Europos church. In addition, there were wall paintings edifying Mithraism, and fragmentary Christian texts in Hebrew.

In the Syrian Civil War, the site was occupied by ISIL, and what was left of the synagogue and a number of other buildings there appear to have been destroyed, possibly in 2014.

== Jewish community of Dura Europos ==
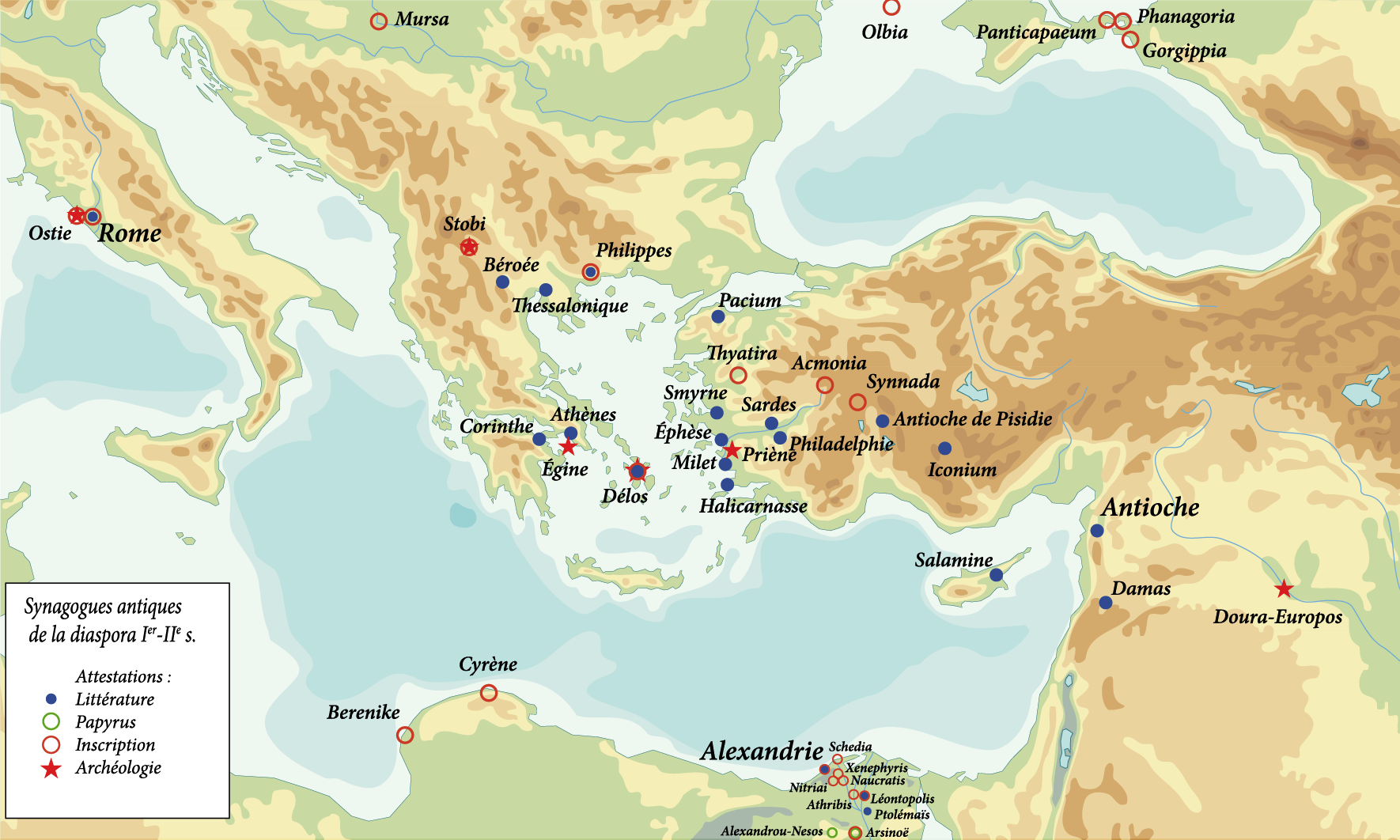
On this map, Dura Europos is located in the far east. The remaining dots indicate the location of other synagogues in the Jewish Diaspora during the first two centuries.

The presence of a Jewish community in Dura Europos long preceded the construction of the synagogue. The cities of Mesopotamia had flourishing Jewish communities, whose members descended both from exiles during the time of Nebuchadnezzar II and from refugees from the Jewish–Roman wars under Vespasian and Hadrian. The Jewish diaspora had an official representative in the Parthian and then Sasanian Empires, the exilarch, necessarily of Davidic descent. The towns of Sura and Nehardea were home to Talmudic academies whose fame can even exceed that of Palestine's, thanks to the respective influence of Abba Arika (Rav) and Rabbi Chila. An important caravan town on the Euphrates, Dura Europos very likely had a Jewish community from the second or first century AD. There is nevertheless no archaeological trace of a religious organization before the installation of the synagogue.

== Location and context ==
The synagogue is a building belonging to the L7 block of Dura Europos: the city was organized according to a Hippodamian plan of regular rectangular blocks of 35–70 m (115–230 ft) since its development by the Seleucids, which archaeologists have arbitrarily numbered for more convenient reference. This islet L7 is located in the first north–south row, and the second east–west row north of the Decumanus Maximus: it is therefore bordered to the west by the street along the rampart, between the towers 19 and 20, and on the other sides respectively by streets A to the east, 2 to the south and 4 to the north.

It was originally a residential block comprising up to ten separate units (designated by the letters A to I on the map below), (Note: The residential blocks of Dura Europos consisted on average of eight dwellings of 300 square m each.) one of which was dedicated to the needs of the Jewish community and transformed into a building of worship. This location on the outskirts of the city, as well as modesty of the first building, are often used as an argument to emphasize the small size of the community. With the expansions and reconstructions made necessary by its development, the synagogue ended up becoming the central nucleus and the most important building of a small Jewish quarter. The last state of the building, with its famous frescoes, is thus the second phase of the second synagogue to occupy the place.

== Plan ==
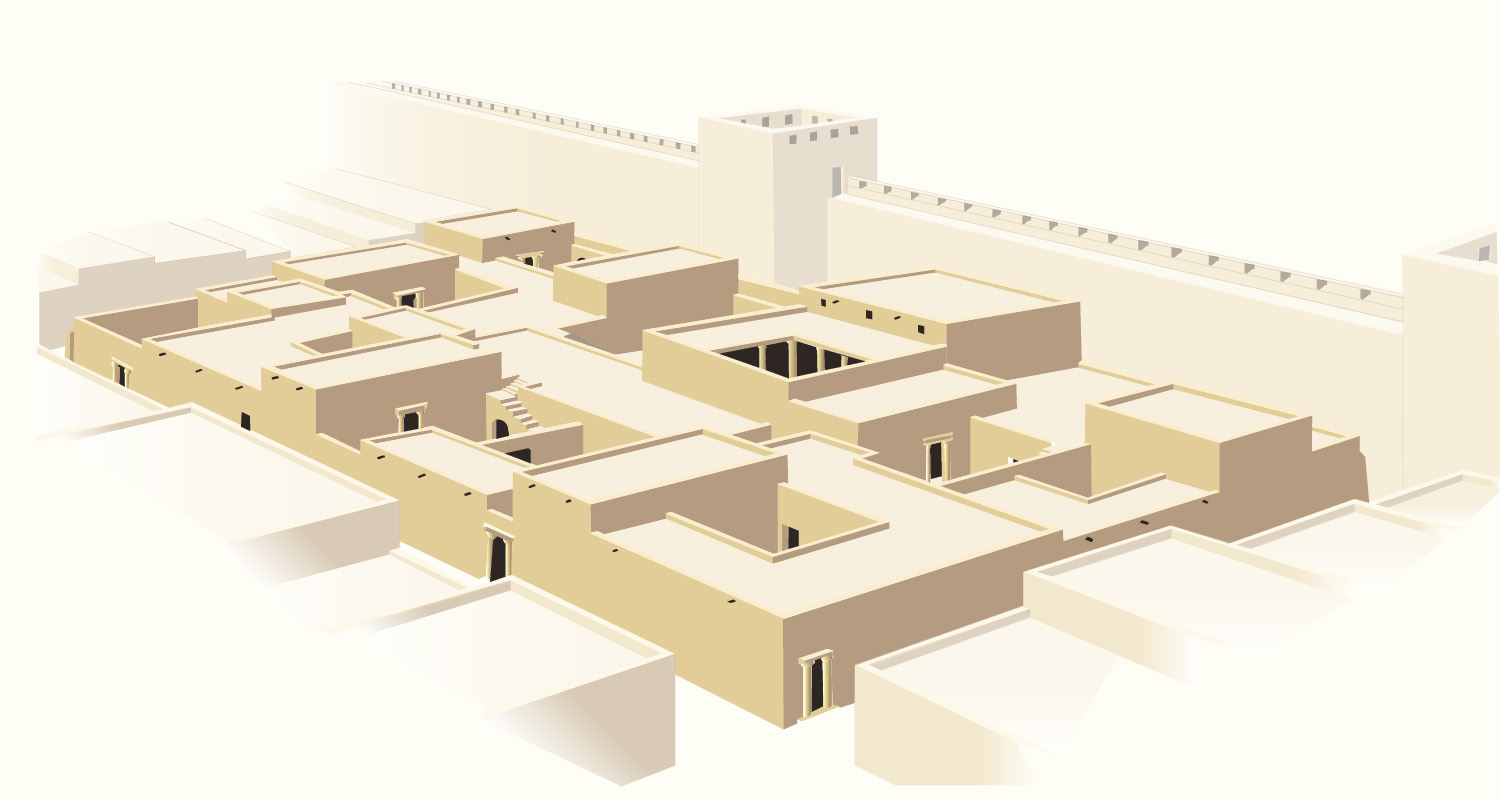
Isometric reconstruction of the L7 islet in Dura-Europos.

Plan of islet L7 in Dura-Europos, with the synagogue (in red) and its outbuildings (in pink). According to the plan of NC Andrews (1941) taken up in Hachlili 1998, p. 41.

Restored plan of the first synagogue.
1. Central courtyard
2. Community assembly hall
3. Corridor
4. Reception hall
5. Reception hall
6. Residential room
7. Auxiliary room to the assembly hall
Plan based on notes by Henry Pearson (circa 1936) as mentioned in Hopkins 1979.

== Location of secured remains ==
The main assembly hall, which contains the wall paintings, is preserved in the National Museum of Damascus in its original arrangement from inside the synagogue. Due to the fall of the regime of Bashar al-Assad, in 2025, a delegation of scholars from outside Syria was able to visit the paintings for the first time in decades.

== Torah shrine ==
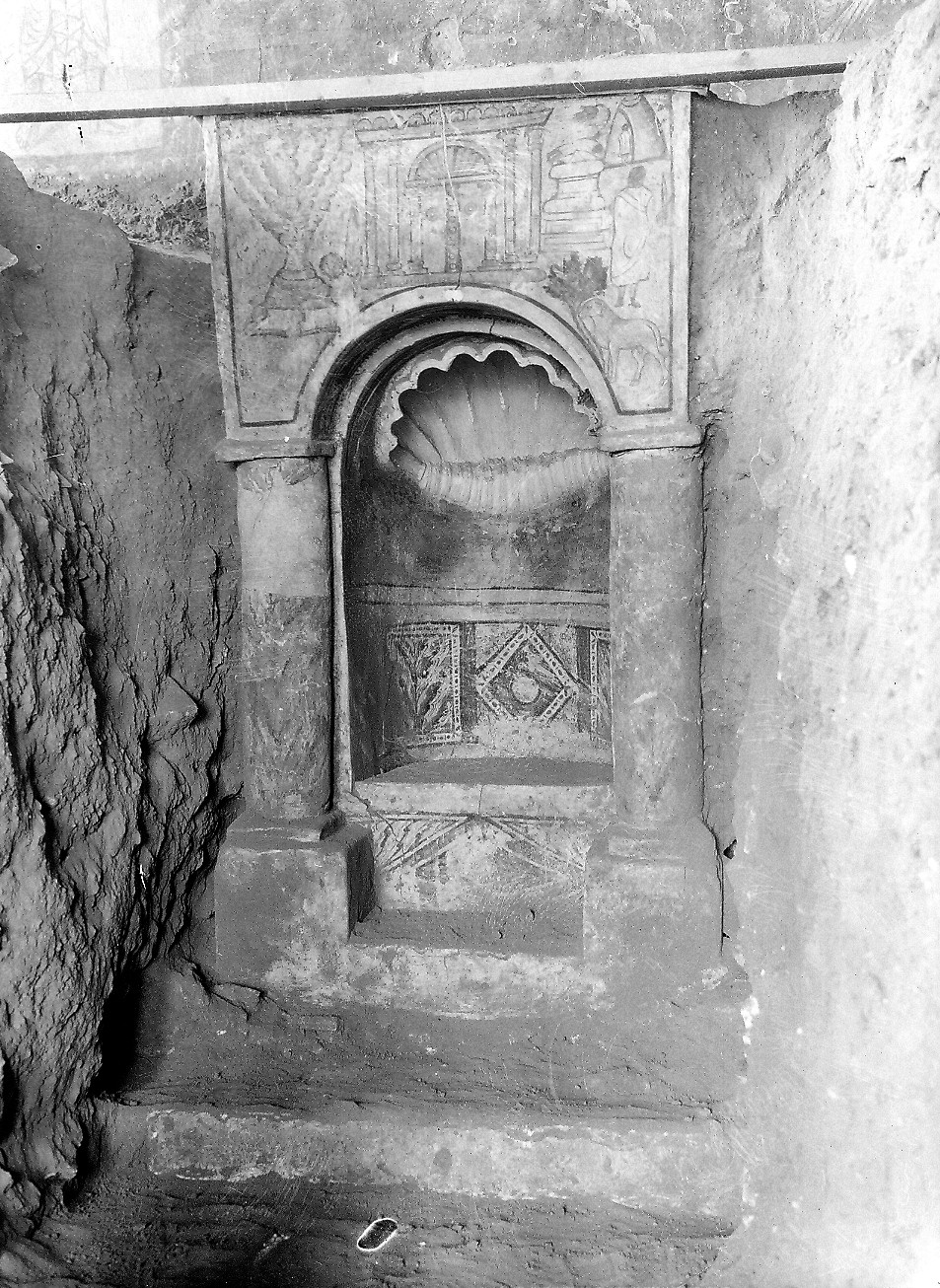
The Torah shrine, Dura-Europos

The decoration of the Torah shrine consists of two elements. The first one includes, "the uppermost step of the niche-block, the columns of the facade, and the intrados of the archivolt." The second one involves important religious scenes, objects and pictures of Jewish worship.

=== Geometric decoration ===
The interior of the niche consists of three parts: the conch had a light-blue color that faded all at once after the excavation. The outer surface of the shell is a rich green color. The columns and the bottom of the niche are painted to look like marble revetments. The bottom of the niche consists of five rectangular panels that are framed on top and bottom by pink bands, and there are red vertical bands to separate them from each other. Out of the five panels, one and five are a pair and two and four are another pair: they are all designed by the same fashion. For the first and the fifth panel, the artists used black diagonal lines to divide triangular patterned designs. Opposing triangles on the top and the bottom of the panel has red stripes and are inscribed with peltae. Opposing triangles on the sides of the panels are decorated with brown-lined irregular concentric shapes, with a green dot in the middle of each. On the second and the fourth panels, the outer frame is decorated with red and pink bands, and alternating red dots and strokes against the white background, with bead-and-reel designs on the corners. On the corners of the strips, there are three-petal like strokes. Inside the frame, there are wavy green and dark green curvy lines of different thickness drawn from the top left and right corners of the panel towards the middle. The central panel of the niche consists of a veined black diamond with a yellow circle in the middle. The diamond is framed with the same bead-and-reel design that surrounded the second and the fourth panels. The four triangles that are on the side of the diamond are decorated in brown colors.

=== Figurative paintings ===
The figural decoration above the niche on the front face of the arch is particularly significant. The spandrels formed a rectangle that is 1.47 m wide and 1.06 m high, framed by a pink border that is 0.04–0.05 m wide. On the left side of the front face is a representation of a menorah, and on the right side was a depiction of the sacrifice of Isaac. Depicted in the central position was a columned building with an arched doorway.

== Wall paintings ==
The main "Assembly Room" contains the painted Torah shrine and the rest of the wall paintings.

The paintings cover the walls of the main "Assembly Room", using three levels of pictures over a dado frieze of symbols in most places, reaching a height of about 7 metres. Stylistically they are provincial versions of contemporary Graeco-Roman style and technique; several different artists seem to have worked on them. Technically they are not fresco (paint fused into wet plaster) but tempera over plaster. Earlier parts of the building have decorative painting with no figures. Some of the paintings have figures whose eyes have been scratched out, especially those in Persian costume.

=== Iconography ===
Scholars cannot agree on the subjects of some scenes, because of damage, or the lack of comparative examples.

The scenes depicted are drawn from the Hebrew Bible and include many narrative scenes, and some single figure "portraits"—58 scenes in total, probably representing about 60% of the original number. They include the Binding of Isaac and other Genesis stories, Moses receiving the Tablets of the Law, Moses leading the Hebrews out of Egypt, Moses at the burning bush, the visions of Ezekiel, a figure of Enoch or possibly Abraham, the water miracle in the desert, the return of Ark from the temple of Dagon, Ezra with the scrolls and many others. The Hand of God motif is used to represent divine intervention or approval in several paintings.

There have been scholarly debates questioning the wall paintings' influence over later Jewish and/or Christian iconography, which have been held due to the relevance of such early depictions of the biblical narrative.

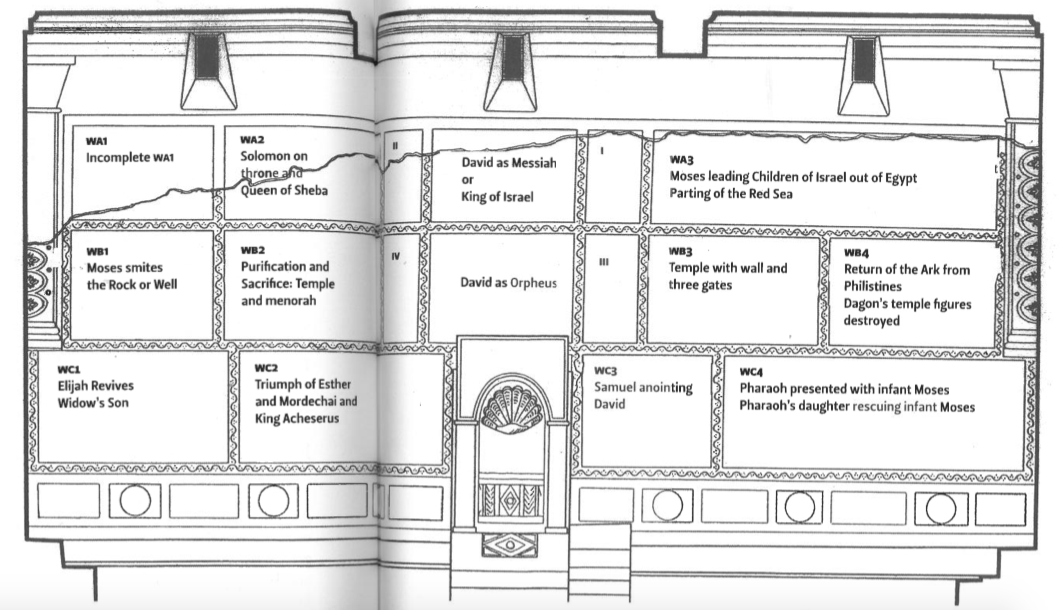
Western wall paintings schematic breaks the wall into discrete sections designated by whichever biblical scene or figure each painting portrays

Depictions of Moses and the Book of Exodus occupy significant swathes of space in the paintings on the Western Wall of the synagogue; of the 12 discrete paintings identified in the Hopkins schematic, 3 center on the narrative of Moses' life, with a total of 7 depictions of Moses across the western wall. Some paintings contain multiple representations of Moses within one distinct scene.

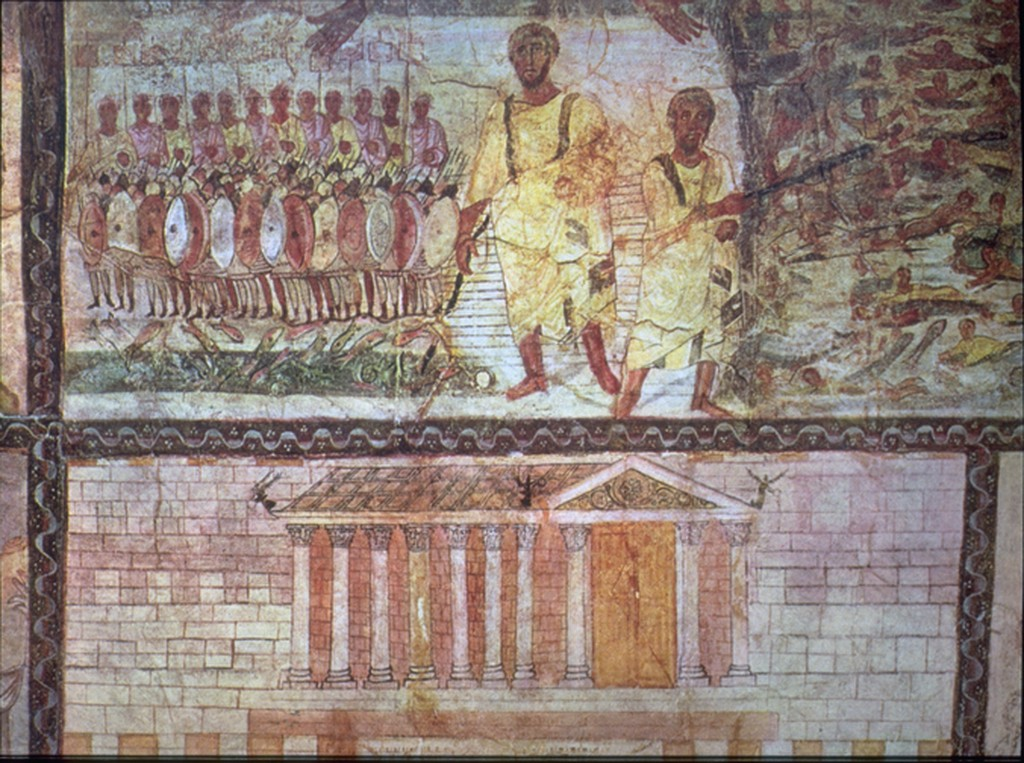
Moses leading the Israelites across the Red Sea, a temple

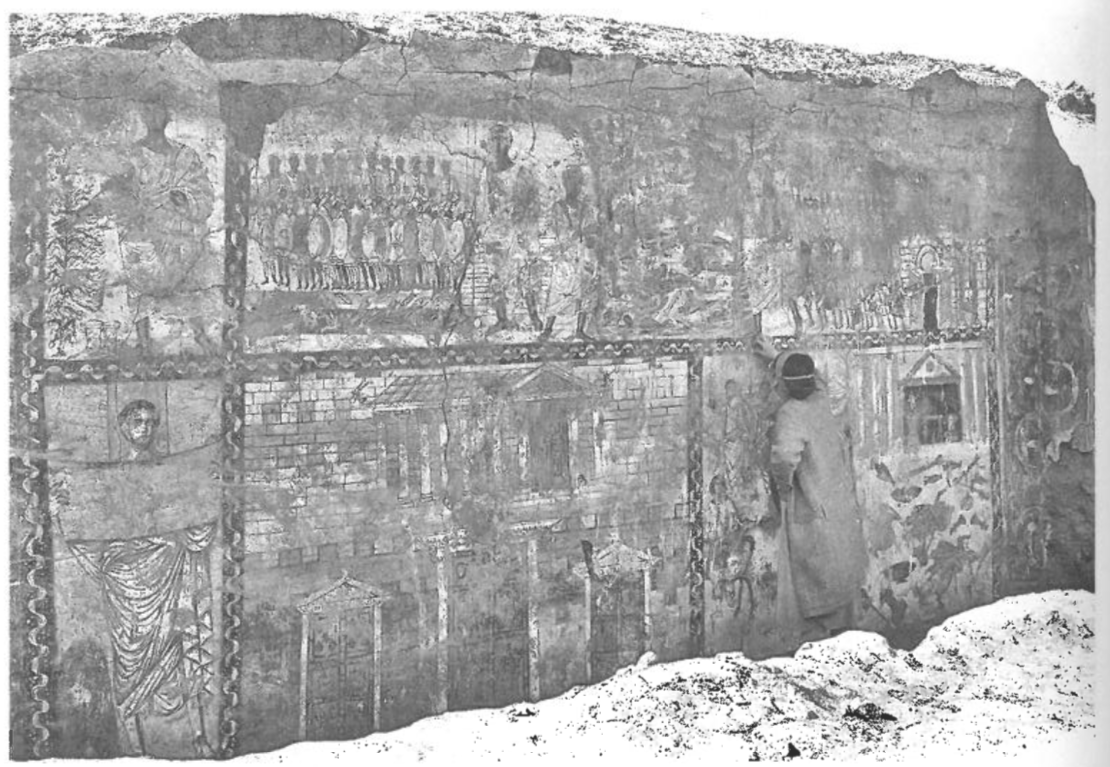
Susan Hopkins pointing to the figure of Moses with the detail showing the Aramaic inscription

The painting of Moses leading the Israelites out of Egypt features multiple Moses figures, much like the painting labeled WC4. Between the first Moses's legs is an inscription in Aramaic reading, "Moses, when he went out from Egypt and cleft the sea." This inscription firmly identifies the murals as depicting the story of Moses leading the Israelites across the Red Sea from the Book of Exodus. First (on the right) Moses is seen raising a club-like staff and facing to the left, leading an army of Israelites behind him. Second, Moses is seen lowering his staff over the Red Sea, causing its parted waters to close and engulf the pursuing Egyptian army. Here he is facing to the right of the painting. And finally, Moses is seen looking to the left at his safely absconded Israelites, holding his staff at his side, pointed downward.

The synagogue paintings' portrayal of Moses and the Israelites each contain influences from the concurrent Roman military culture. Moses is portrayed as the leader of the Israelites who are shown not as civilians or slaves, but as an armed military force. In this context, Moses' powerful stance and comparatively large size present him as the military leader of the Israelites. His long club-like rod or staff and bearded visage have been compared to a relief of Hercules from the 2nd-century Durene temple of Zeus, built during the 114 CE Roman occupation of the city.

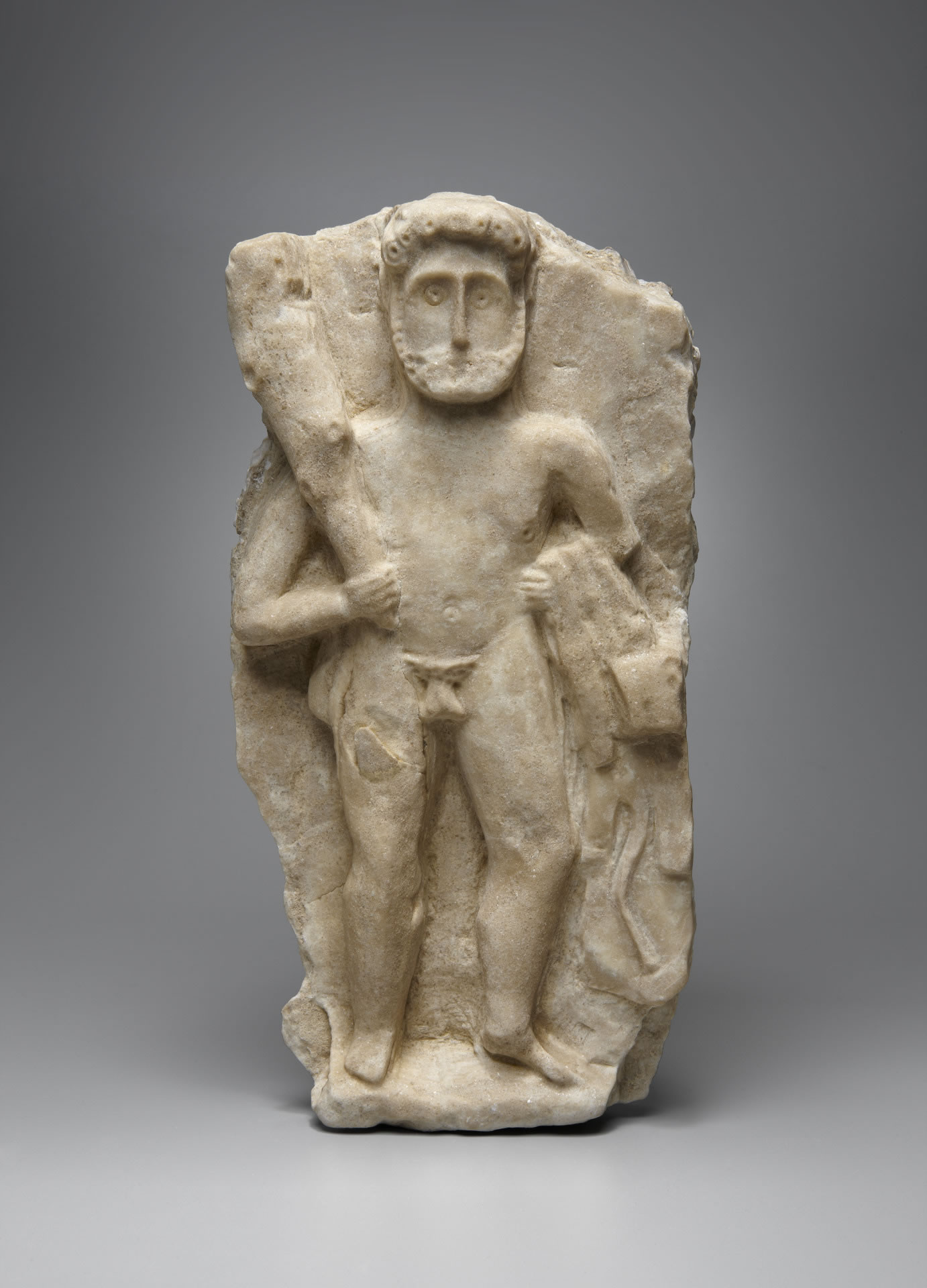
Relief depicting Hercules, Temple of Zeus

The mass of Israelites positioned to his left carry shields and spears. Their shields are layered and overlapped over one another to form a physical barrier, much like the Roman shield wall formations of the phalanx and the testudo. Behind the Israelite soldiers stand figures representing the twelve Elders of Israel, each holding a pole with a square banner or flag, resembling the Roman vexillum, the military standards of the Roman army.

Below the painting of Moses and the Israelites is a painting of a temple, portrayed explicitly as a contemporary Roman-style temple. The temple's pediment is low and is decorated with a rinceau design, often and originally found in Roman buildings. The temple also features Corinthian columns, characteristic of both earlier Hellenistic and contemporary Roman architecture. At either end of each of the temple's two pediments are acroteria in the form of winged victory or Nike figures. Both the architectural ornament of the acroteria and the Nike symbol stem are characteristic of Hellenistic and contemporary Roman architecture.

==== Consecration of the Tabernacle mural ====
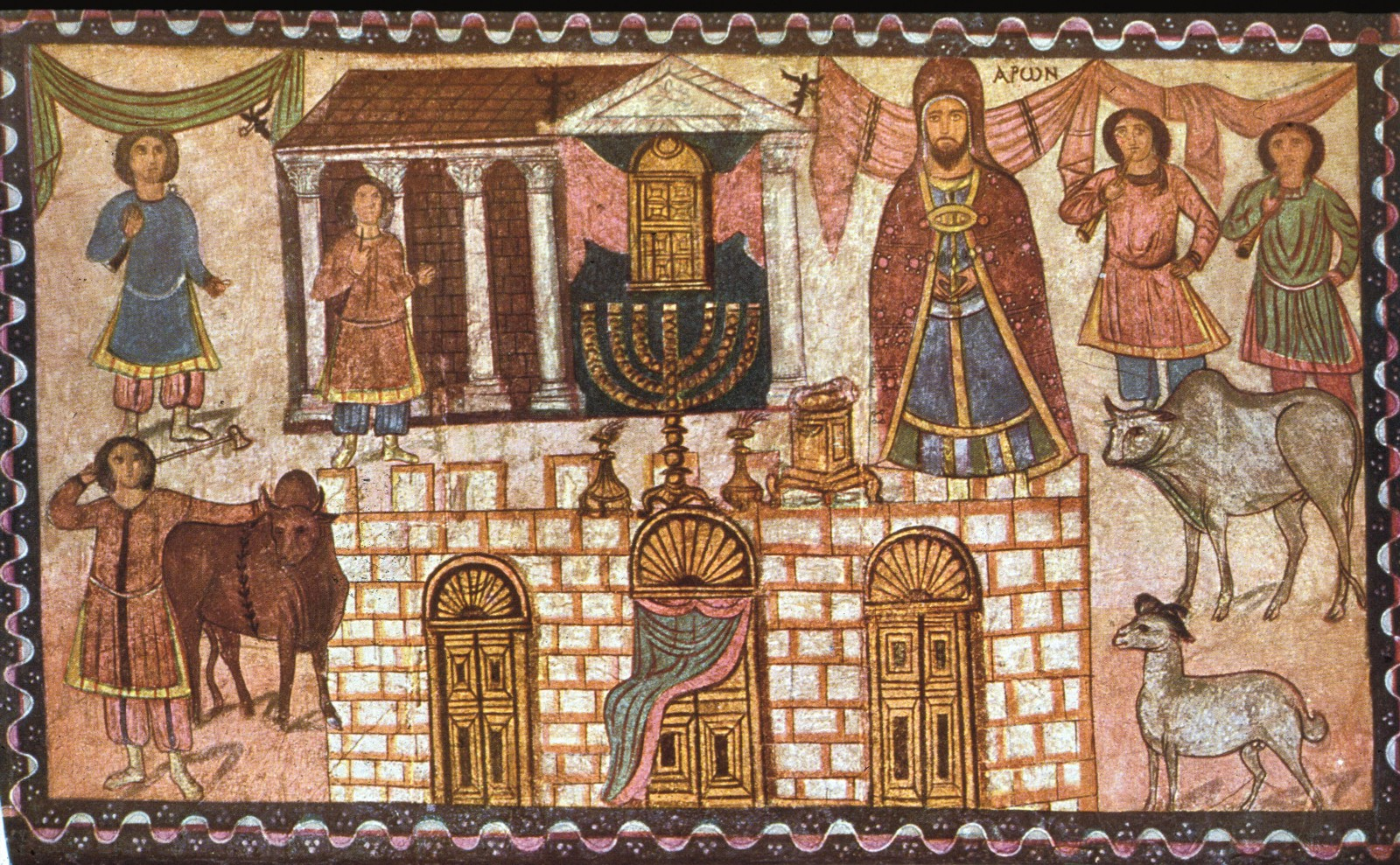
Consecration of the Tabernacle (c. 245–256 CE)

Located on the western wall of the synagogue's assembly hall, just left of the Torah niche, is a mural depicting the Tabernacle. The artist did not follow the biblical description of the Tabernacle as a tent, but rather was inspired by Roman temples, and includes a cella, pediment and capitals of the Corinthian order. The local Jewish population did not mind illustrating the Tabernacle based on Roman civil architecture for unknown reasons. Coins showing similar structures were found in Dura-Europos, and the painter might have used them as models.

In this particular work, Aaron is depicted standing just to the right of the door of the tent of meeting, denoted by the Greek alphabet inscription ΑΡΩΝ ("ARON"). He is dressed in contemporary Persian or Sassanid style, but with the same colors mentioned in the Book of Exodus: gold, blue, and purple. The ephod worn by the high priest as described in the Bible is not shown.

To the bottom left, there is a young priest leading a cow, which is the special sacrificial red heifer. A dorsal band decorates its body. The two animals just to the left of Aaron, a bull and a ram, are atonement sacrifices for Aaron to be made on Yom Kippur.

Selected paintings of the Dura-Europos synagogue
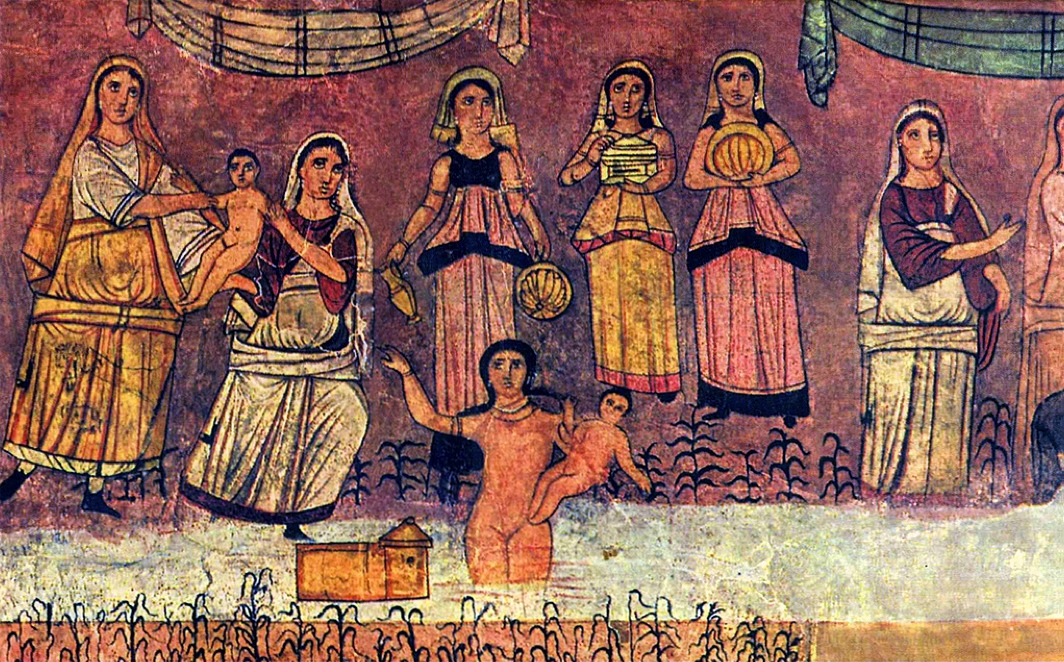
Pharaoh's daughter finds Moses

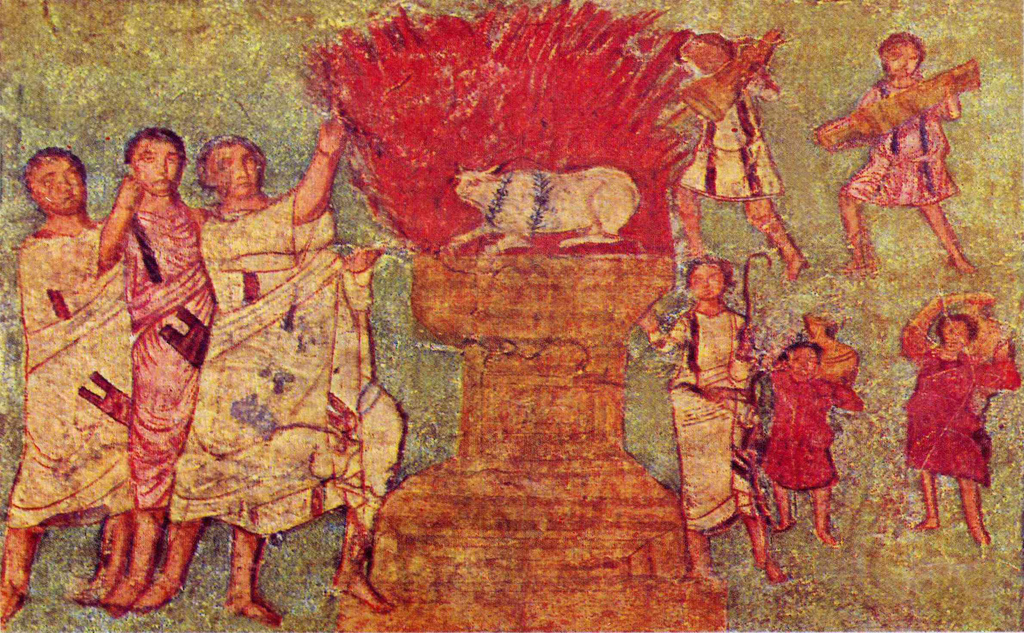
Golden Calf

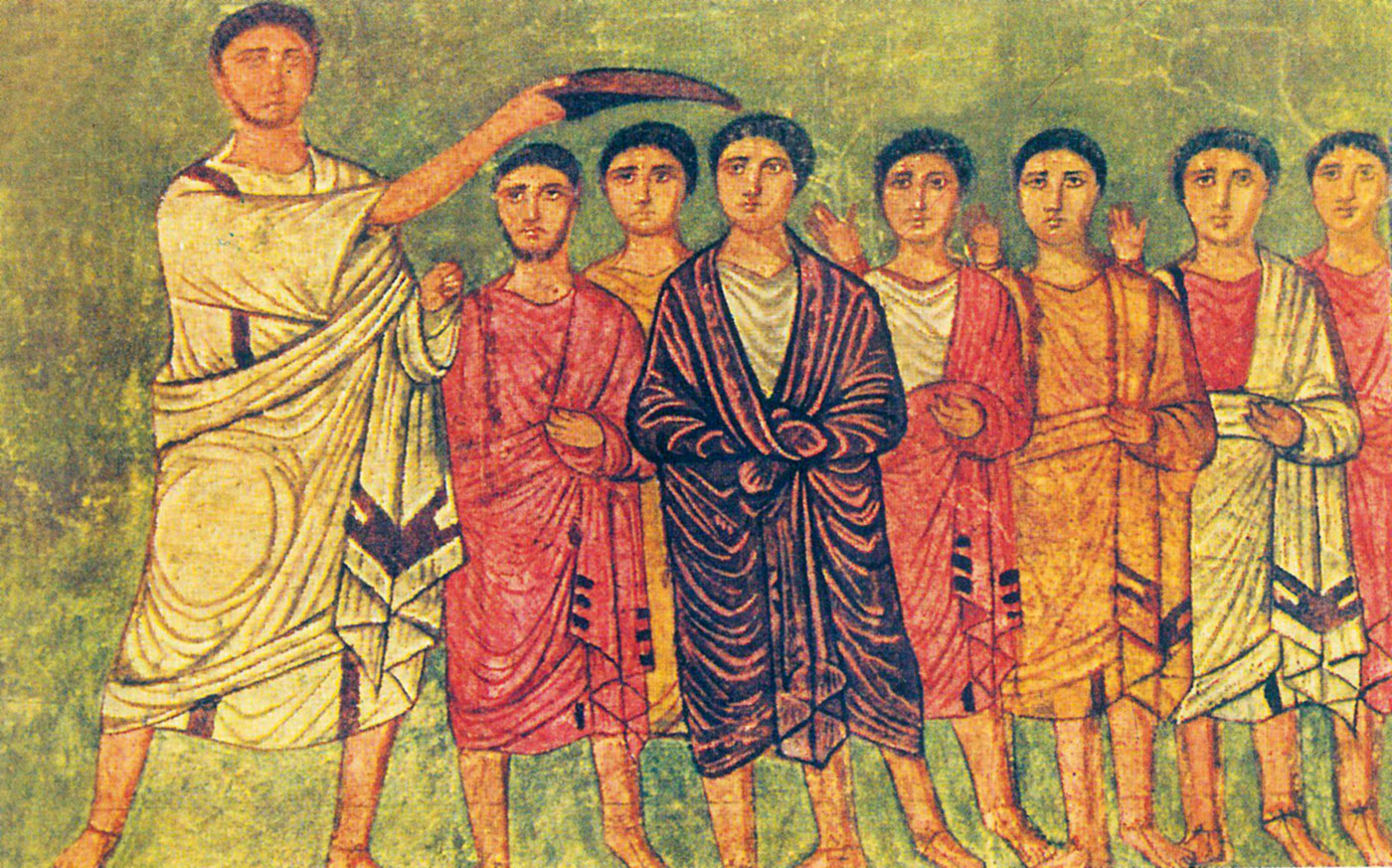
Samuel anoints David

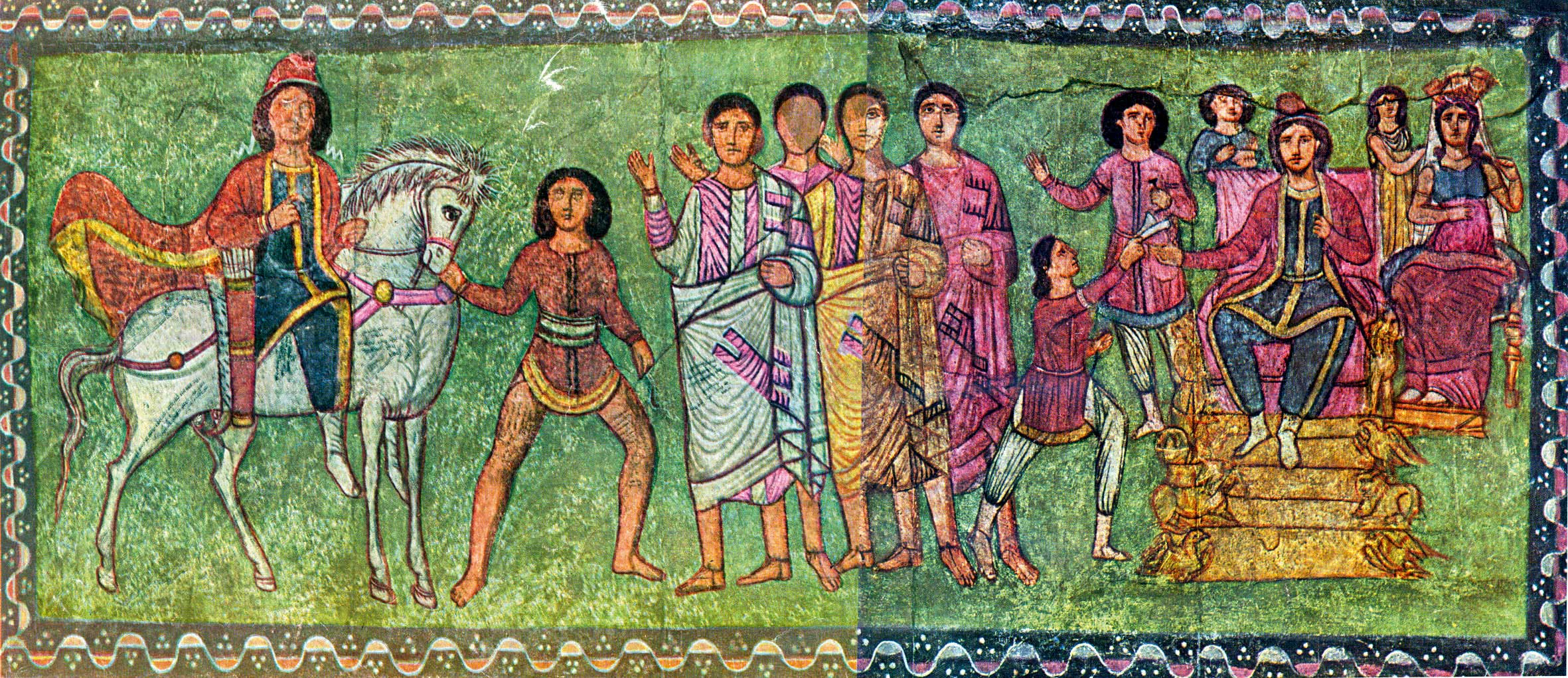
Mordecai and Esther

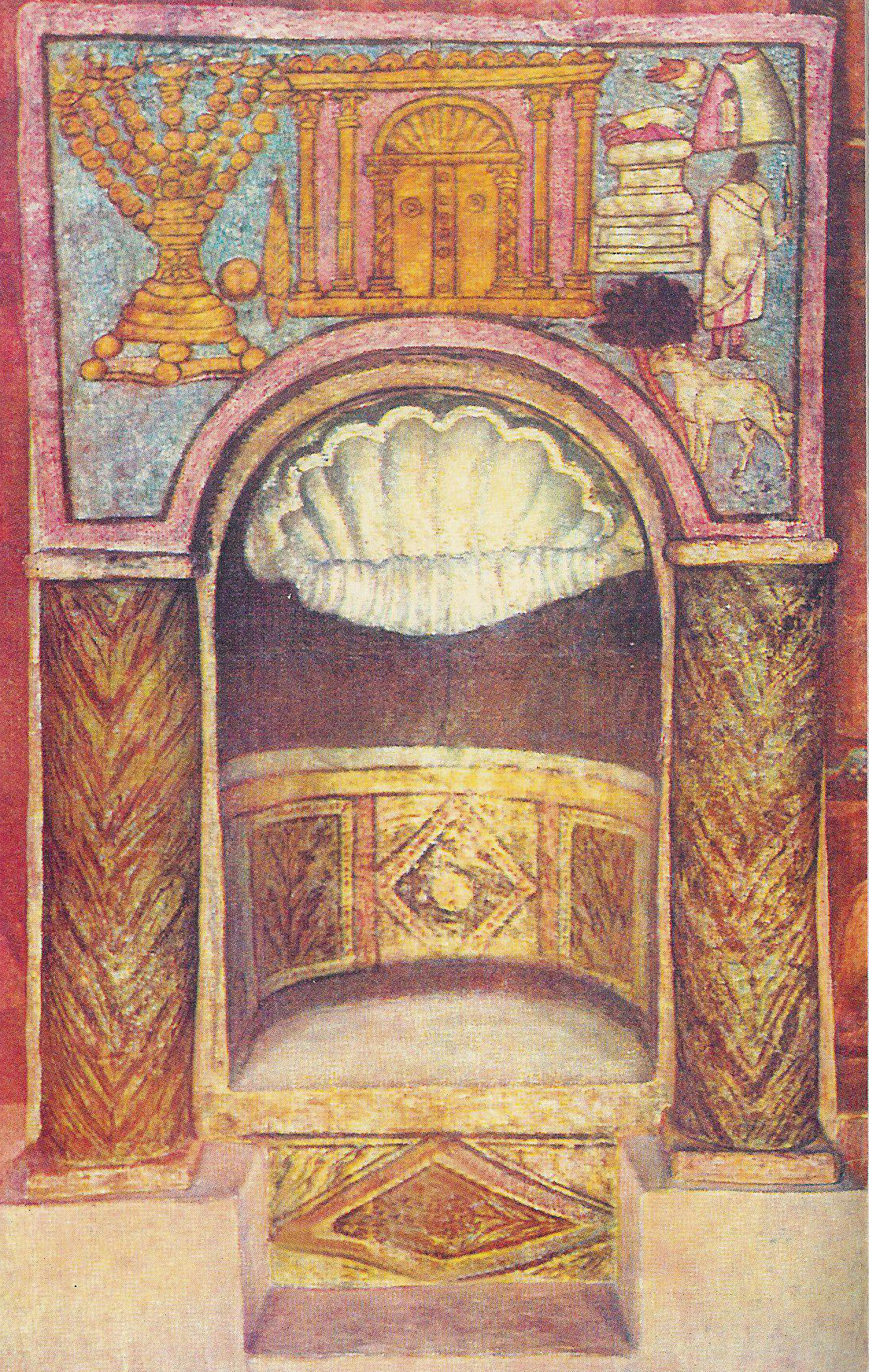
The Ciborium; Herod's Temple appears on top, in a similar style as depicted on the Bar-Kokhva revolt coins

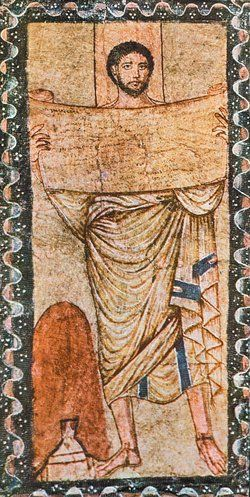
Ezra reads the Law

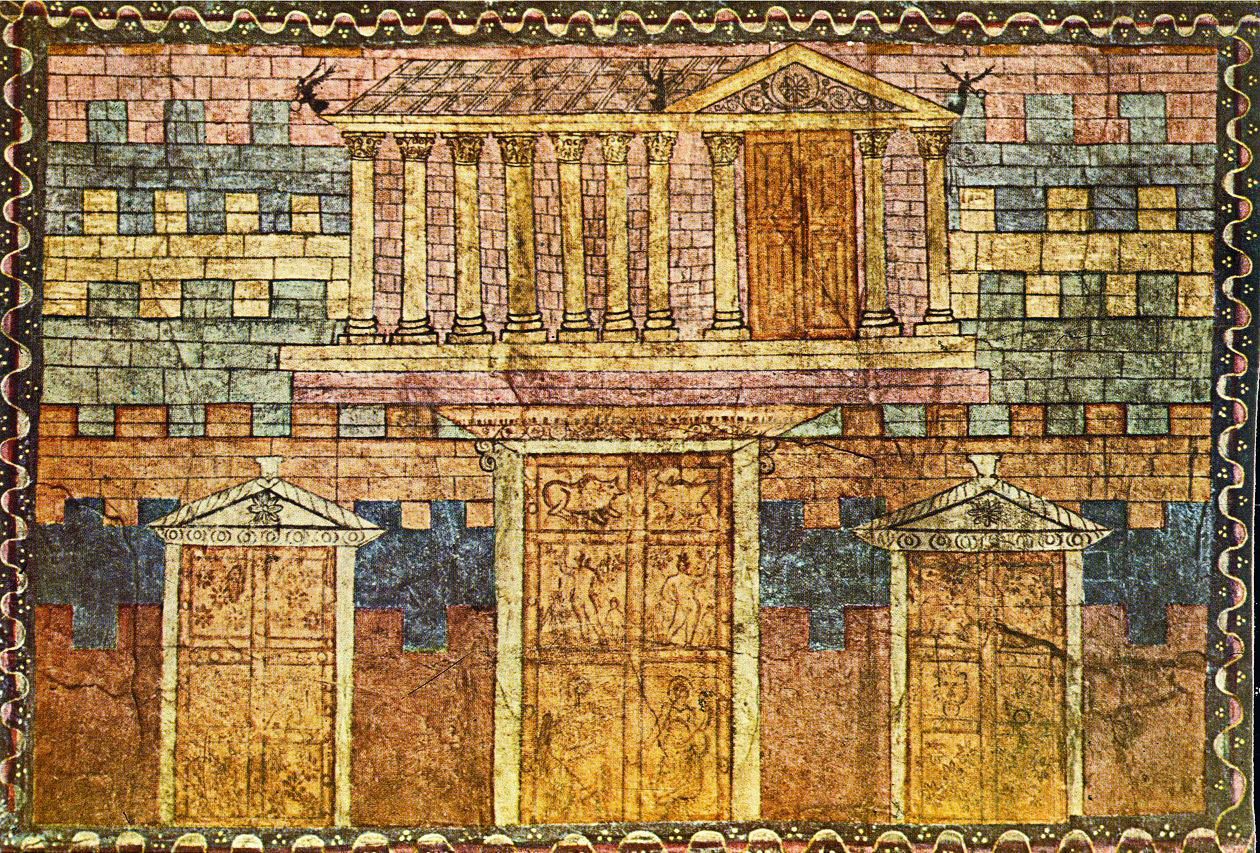
Solomon's Temple

== Ceiling: decoration and inscriptions ==
The ceiling was believed to have been created between 244 and 245 CE; it was part of the retransformation from which the Dura-Europos synagogue derived. It was around 7 m tall and had dimensions of 13.65 m × 7.68 m, like the assembly hall. It was later found out that the previous synagogue was also decorated similarly, including tiles decorated with fruits, shapes, and flowers. However, the excavated 3rd-century ceiling was made up of even smaller tiles than the previous ceiling; it occupied a larger space and had a wider variety of tile inscriptions. A total of 234 tiles were discovered and brought back at the time of discovery. However, there may be more that were destroyed and different designs that had not been discovered.

The synagogue's ceiling is made up of repeated tiles and inscriptions. The ceiling is often compared to aerial mosaics, similar to coffered ceilings that supported the tiles, which were already discovered in western societies, such as Roman and Hellenistic cities. The original placement of the tiles, between 244 and 245 CE, has not been clearly stated, but each tile was around 0.37 to 0.42 m^{2} and about 0.045 m in depth. They were formed out of terracotta, which was heated, then decorated and plastered to the above ceiling. Imprints of brick and wooden beams were located on the ceiling tile at the time of the synagogue's build and made the tiles' placement clearer.

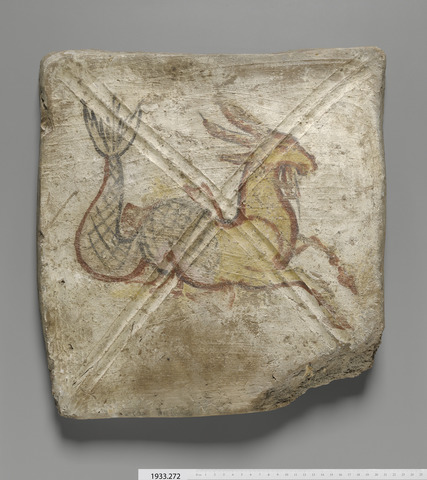
A capricorn tile from the Dura-Europos synagogue ceiling

The tiles are consistent with either pictorial images or inscriptions being displayed. There were about 20 different pictorial tiles that were repeated across the ceiling. They varied from sea animals, land animals, grains, and vegetation to faces and females. Often displayed are female faces, which have been counted to recur 23 times on the ceiling and usually follow a particular pattern. The available prototypes are considered goddesses such as Flora or Demeter-Persephone. Female faces were among the most popular pictorial tiles. Other popular pictorial types include vegetation, which consists of about 41 roses/flowers, a centaur, and pinecones, among others. Other tiles have depictions of the zodiac signs Capricorn and Pisces. Another theme was the evil eye; an example is a tile featuring a double-lidded eye with a snake on either side. The same tile also had a scarab and three nails above the eye, with the inscription "IAO". Several tiles, both inscribed and pictorials, had mystical and symbolic meanings.

Even though it is debated, some scholars claim that the entirety of the ceiling symbolizes heaven and eternal immortality. However, some uncertainty remains due to the paint not being recognizable on the tile after sun exposure.

=== Tile inscriptions ===
The inscribed tiles were written in Greek or Aramaic and followed a specific prototype. The saved tiles were mainly in Greek; the prototype was the tile painted black, with a black and red leafy wreath on it, to which text was confined. One of the first tiles discovered, in Greek, reads "(Samuel [son] of Yedaya, elder of the Jews founded [the building])", naming archisynagogue Samuel as the 'founder' in AD 245. Often names were mentioned, and it suggested that they were donors or people involved in the creation, reconstruction, or decoration of the synagogue; it is not clear what their roles were, but their involvement is evident.

== Cultural context and purpose of the murals ==
Because of the paintings adorning the walls, the synagogue was at first mistaken for a Greek temple, though this was quickly corrected by the vice-director of excavations Robert du Mesnil du Buisson in Les peintures de la synagogue de Doura-Europos (Rome, 1939). Mesnil also made detailed comparisons of the friezes from the Dura synagogue with those of the mithraeum, the Christian baptistery, and the temple of the Palmyrene gods.

Scholars think the paintings were used as an instructional display to educate and teach the history and laws of the religion. Some think that this synagogue was painted in order to compete with the many other religions practiced in Dura-Europos; the new (and considerably smaller) Christian Dura-Europos church appears to have opened shortly before the surviving paintings were begun in the synagogue. The large-scale pictorial art in the synagogue came as a surprise to scholars, although they already suspected that there was a tradition of Jewish narrative religious art at this period, which at the time of the discovery were thought to have all been lost, leaving only traces in later Christian art. The discovery of the synagogue helps to dispel narrow interpretations of Judaism's historical prohibition of visual images.

== Relationship to early Christian art and late Jewish art ==
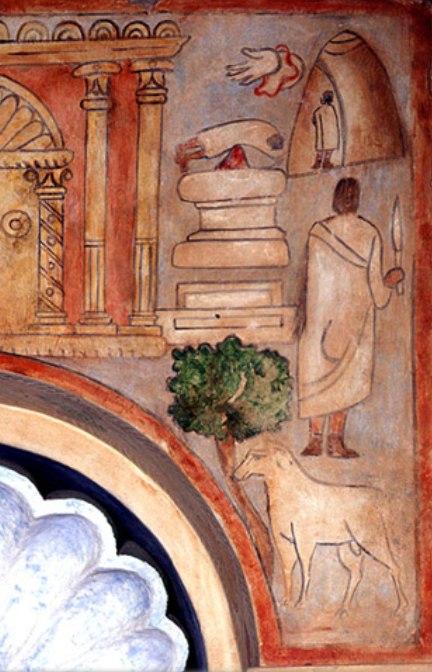
The sacrifice of Isaac in the Dura synagogue

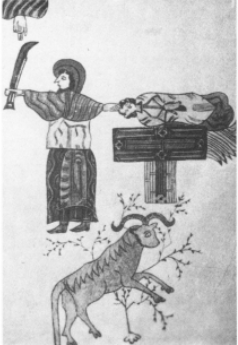
The sacrifice of Isaac in the León Bible of 960

The synagogue of Dura-Europos offers negligible influence on later Christian and Jewish artwork. The time that the Dura-Europos synagogue was active was not long as it was buried as part of the Roman defense against Sasanian troops in 256 A.D. The Dura-Europos Synagogue remains the earliest example of Jewish artwork available for study. It contains not only Hellenistic and Roman influences, but Sasanian as well.

The layout of the paintings suggest that they were inspired by a copybook with examples and formulae. While there are similarities to other works of antiquity, the differences between each work bear too much difference in order for one to be considered influential. There have been attempts to link these works, but they have proven largely unsuccessful.

The Leon Bible, as an example, which was written ca. 960, had in common with Dura-Europos the scene of the sacrifice of Isaac. However, the León Bible showed key differences. Their position in the León Bible shows them facing the viewer, whereas Dura Europos they are not. In the León Bible, the Hand of God bestows the benedictio latina, whereas in Dura-Europos it makes an appearance with no such manuscript. The Dura painting shows Abraham's hand free of Isaac's hair, whereas in the León miniature, it is grasping it. Finally, in the Dura painting Abraham is using a knife as opposed to the sword he uses in the León Bible.

== See also ==
- History of the Jews in Syria
- Jewish Christianity
- List of synagogues in Syria
- Oldest synagogues in the world
- Synagogal Judaism
- Zodiac mosaics in ancient synagogues

== Sources ==
- Hachlili, R. (1998). Ancient Jewish Art and Archaeology in the Diaspora. Leiden. ISBN 978-90-04-10878-3.
- Hopkins, C. (1979). The Discovery of Dura-Europos. B. Goldman. ISBN 978-0-300-02288-9.
- Sed Rajna, Gabrielle; Amishai-Maisels, Ziva; Jarrassé, Dominique; Klein, Rudolf; Reich, Ronny (1995). L'Art juif. Citadelle & Mazenod. ISBN 978-2850880667.
- White, L. M. (1990). The Social Origins of Christian Architecture. Vol. 1. Valley Forge: Johns Hopkins University Press.
- White, L. M. (1997). The Social Origins of Christian Architecture. Vol. 2. Valley Forge: Johns Hopkins University Press.
