= Florentius of Valeránica =

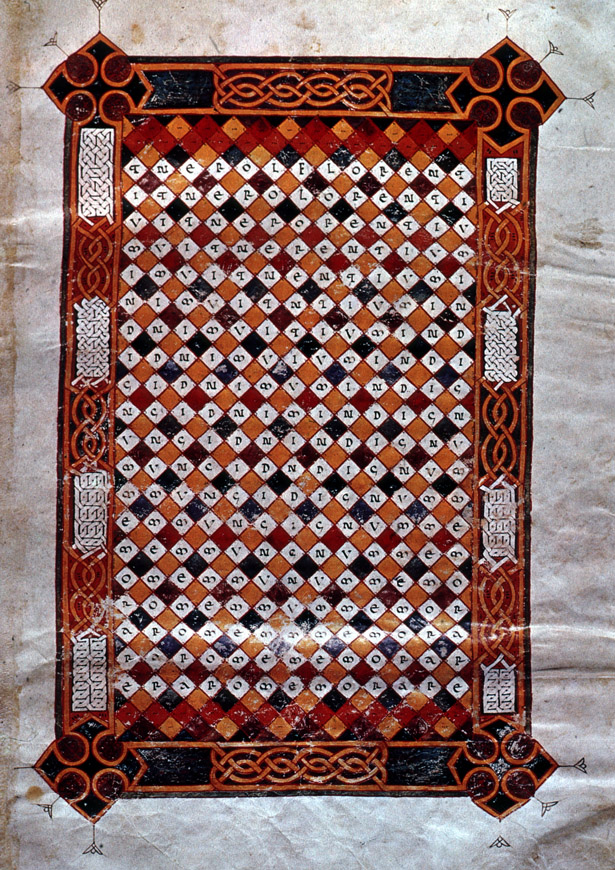
A page from Florentius's Moralia in Job of 945

Florentius (Spanish: Florencio; c. 918 – after 978) was a monk, scribe and artist of the monastery of San Pedro de Berlangas (Valeránica) in the County of Castile.

All that is known of Florentius comes from the colophons of manuscripts he copied (or their copies). He gave his age as 24 or 25 years in a colophon of 945, but in another of 953 he gave it more precisely as 35. The latter is generally accepted, putting his birth around 918. His place of birth is unknown. He may have been offered to the recently founded monastery of Valeránica as a child oblate or perhaps to its nearby mother house, San Pedro de Cardeña.

The first record of Florentius's activity is the foundation charter of the monastery of San Andrés de Boada, which he drew up on 1 March 937. That same day, he drew up Count Fernán González's charter of donation to the monastery of San Pedro de Arlanza. On 15 March 942, he wrote up Fernán's concession of some salt pans at Añana to Valeránica. All of these acts are preserved as copies. The original of the donation to Arlanza is also preserved in the British Library.

Florentius is known to have executed five complete codices. The oldest is the Oña Bible, of which only a few folios are preserved today. He completed it on 10 June 943. On 11 April 945, he finished a copy of Gregory the Great's lengthy Moralia in Job. It is currently Madrid, Biblioteca Nacional de España, MS 80. On 9 July 953, he completed a copy of Cassiodorus's commentary on the Psalms. Once kept in the San Isidoro de León, it disappeared early in the 19th century. Sometime after 953, Florentius copied out the Liber homeliarum of Smaragdus of Saint-Mihiel. It is kept today in the cathedral of Córdoba. His last known codex is the León Bible of 20 July 960, which was mostly executed by his student, Sancho, under his direction.

Florentius is recognized today for his calligraphy, his decorated initials, well executed frontispieces and miniatures and his work with interlace, relatively recently brought to Spain from the north. In the Diccionario biográfico español, he is called the "prince of calligraphers" (príncipe de los calígrafos). All of his codices are large in size, deluxe illuminated manuscripts that use multiple inks.

Two original documents in Florentius's own hand survive from his later years. One is Count García Fernández's purchase of Covarrubias from Valeránica, dated 7 September 972. The other is the act by which the count founded the infantazgo of Covarrubias on 24 November 978. On the same day, he drew up the count's donation of the monastery of San Quirce de Yesares at Añana to Valeránica. This act survives only in a copy. It is the latest record of Florentius.
