= León Bible of 960 =

Bible manuscript

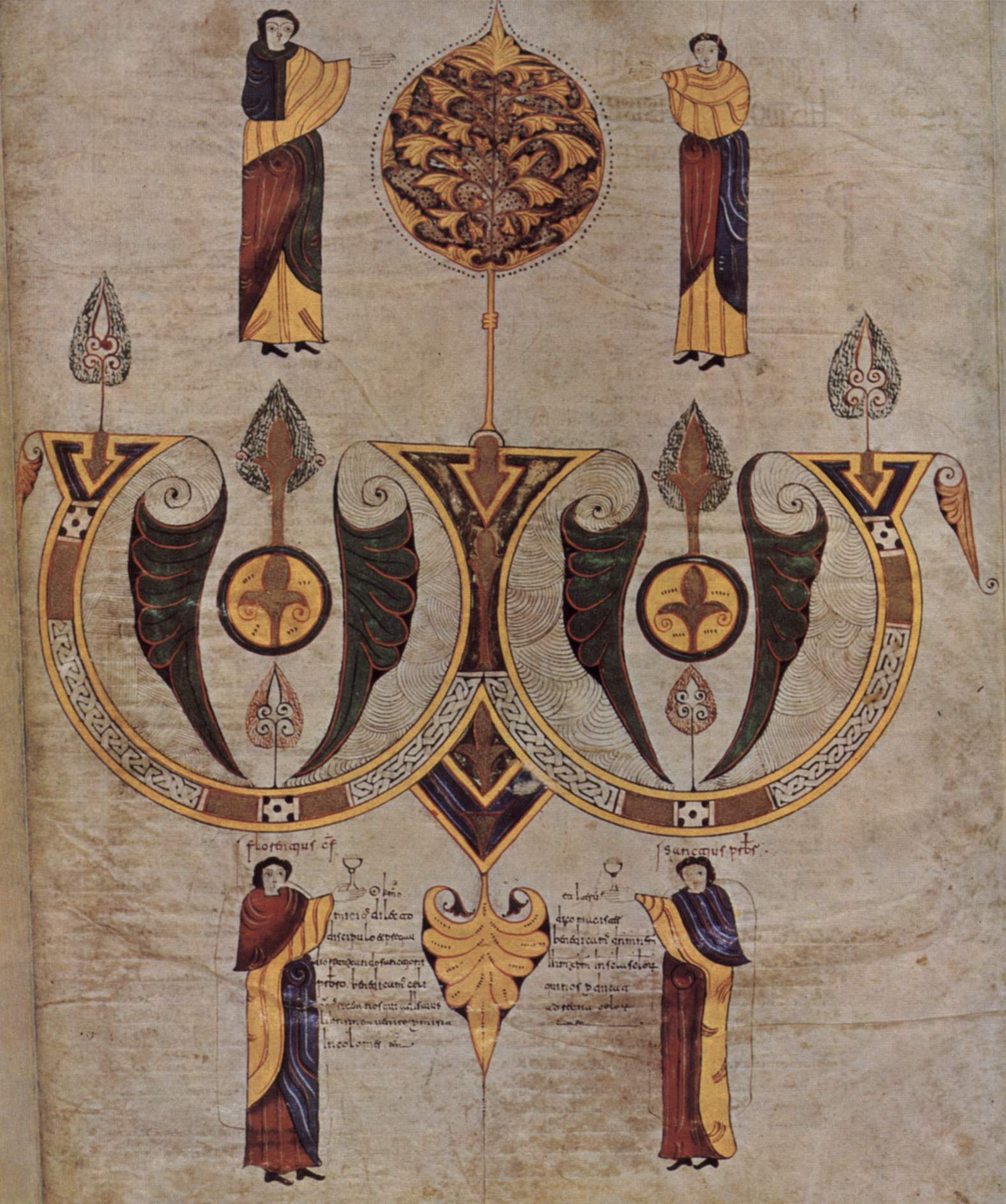
Omega (folio 514, recto).

The León Bible of 960 or Codex Biblicus Legionensis is a mozarabic Bible manuscript copied and illuminated in 960 at the monastery of Valeránica in Tordómar. It is now held in the library of the Basílica de San Isidoro, León - why it moved there is unknown, though the monastery in which it was produced disappeared at the end of the 10th century and so it could have been given to the Basilica during the 11th century by Ferdinand I of Leon and his wife Sancha, the main patrons of the basilica.

Its colophon shows it was completed in the monastery of Valeránica on 19 June 960, copied and illuminated by a copyist named Sanctus and his master Florentius, though it is difficult to distinguish between the two men's work. They are shown together toasting its completion beneath a large omega (f.514r), which may have been influenced by Islamic scenes of the heavenly banquet in Islamic art.

Its text is in two columns of Visigothic minuscule, usually used in Spanish manuscripts between the 8th and 12th centuries. It contains a high number of glosses in Latin and Arabic. It begins with a large full-page image showing Christ and the four symbols of the evangelists in medallions. This is followed by ten pages of tables showing Christ's descent from Adam and Eve. The Old Testament is decorated with 80 images within the columns, illustrating the passages immediately above them. The New Testament is less decorated, with ten pages of canon tables and small miniatures of saint Paul at the start of the epistles. The illuminations' style is close to that of Beatus manuscripts of the same era and of Spanish High Medieval illuminated manuscripts.

== Gallery ==
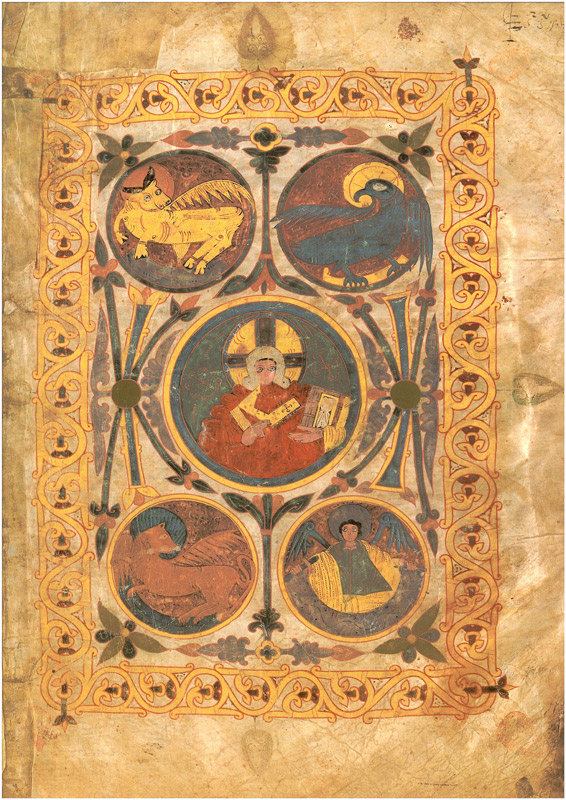
Frontispiece - Christ and evangelists

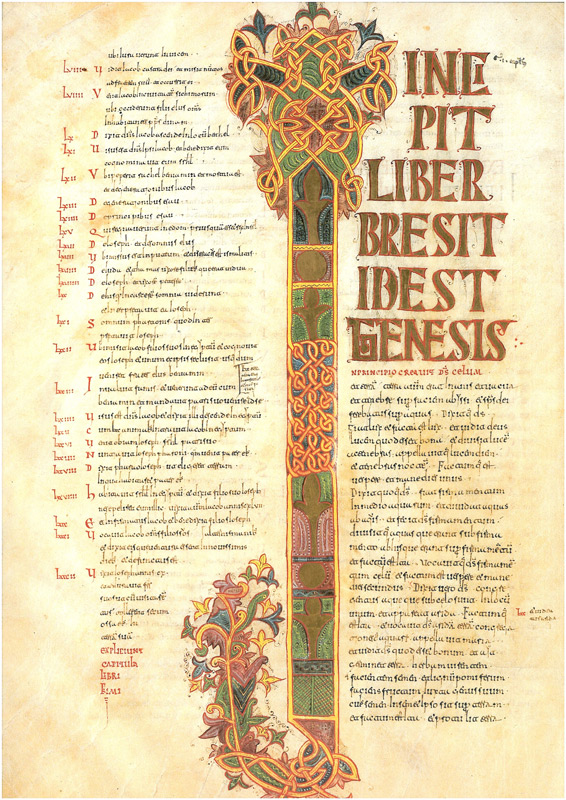
Incipit of the Book of Genesis

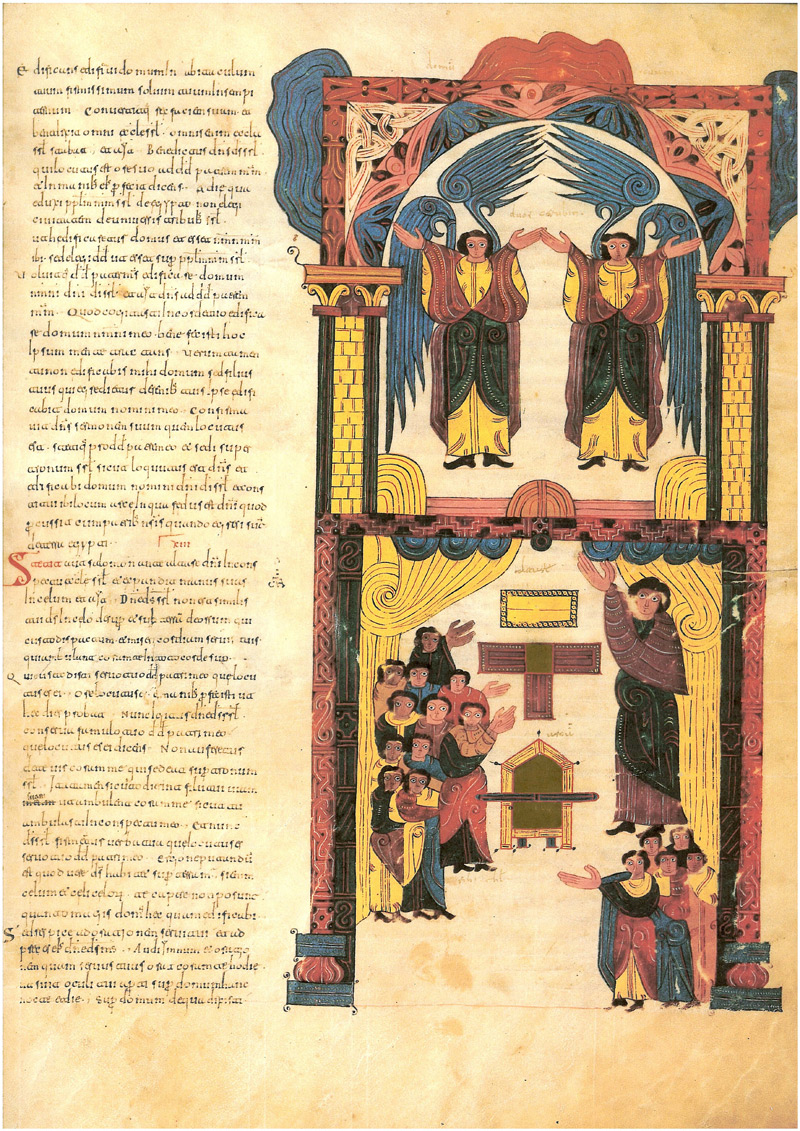
David before the Ark of the Covenant

== Sources of its iconography ==
Its iconography has various sources. Its arrangement of Old Testament illustrations seems to show it was copied from a lost Visigothic bible, which had itself been copied from older illuminated manuscripts. A more recent model could have served as an intermediary stage - the copyist Florentinus produced a (now lost) bible in the same monastery in 943, which also acted as the model for a bible copied at San Isidoro around 1162. Florentinus also produced the Commentary on Job of 945, which might have been another inspiration for the illuminations in the 960 Bible.

Palmettes and half-leaves also show Islamic influence whilst the frontispiece of Christ and the evangelists' symbols is influenced by Carolingian models, particularly in its colour scheme. A third influence may be a Jewish manuscript drawing on the wall-paintings in the Dura-Europos synagogue, such as the sacrifice of Isaac or Aaron in front of the tabernacle, though this hypothesis is questioned.

== Bibliography ==
- Williams, John (1977). Manuscrits espagnols du Haut Moyen Age [Spanish manuscripts from the early Middle Ages] (in French). Paris: Chêne. pp. 35, 55–61. ISBN 978-2-85108-147-6. OCLC 10962257.
