= Moralia in Job of 945 =

10th-century illuminated manuscript

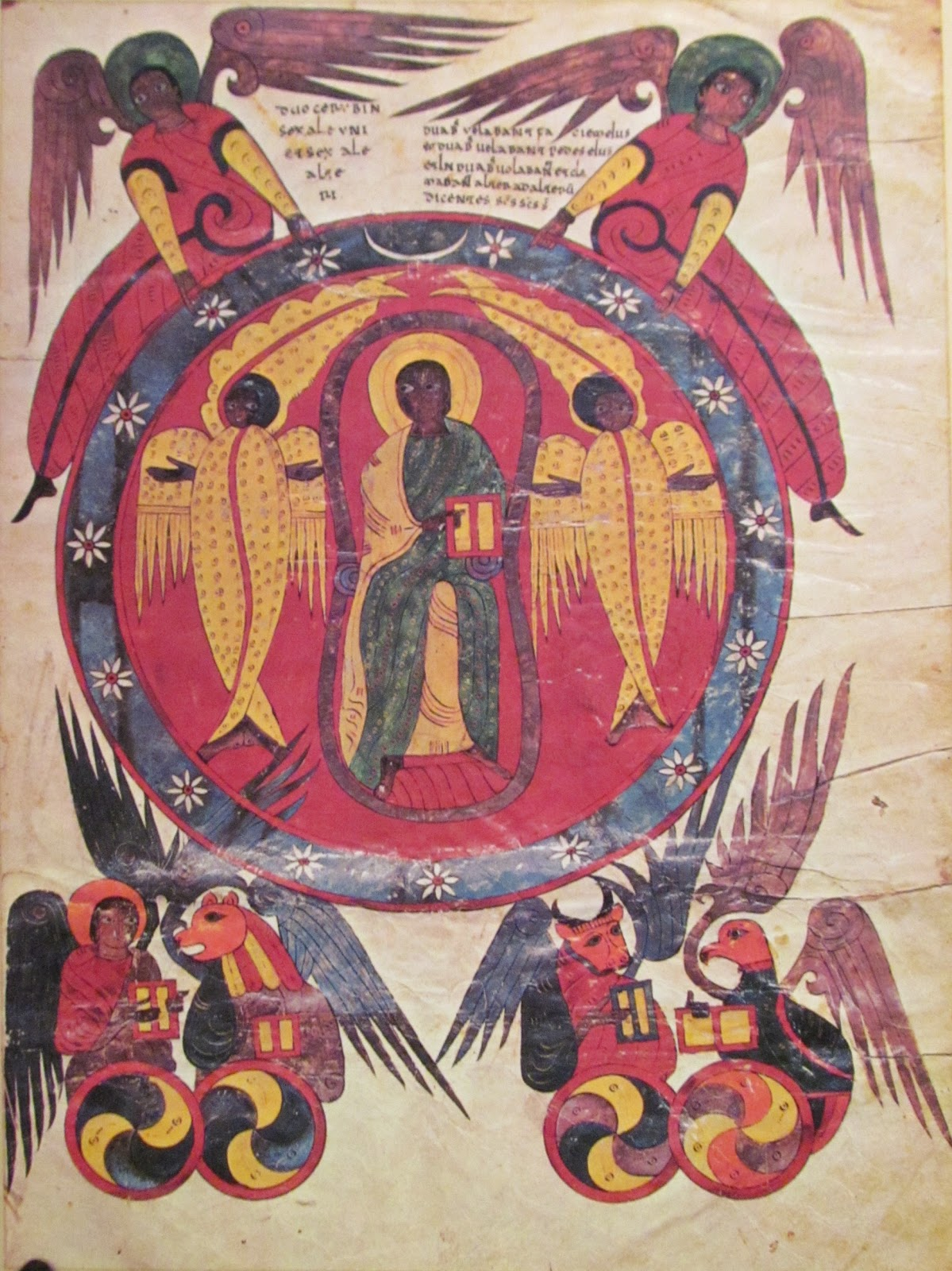
Christ in Majesty, folio 2 (recto).

The Moralia in Job of 945 is an illuminated manuscript of 502 bound folios, containing the text of the Commentary on Job by Gregory the Great. A colophon on the verso of its folio 500 shows its copying and illumination was completed on 11 April 945 by one Florentius in the monastery of Valeránica in what is now the town of Tordómar in Spain. Florentius is also known as the artist and copyist of other important Spanish manuscripts of this era, including the León Bible of 960.

The manuscript was later moved to the library of Toledo Cathedral, where its annotations in Arabic were added. It remained there until it was moved in 1869 to its present home in the Biblioteca Nacional de España, where it is catalogued as Ms.80.

== Bibliography ==
- John Williams, "The Moralia in Iob of 945: : Some Iconographic Sources", Archivo español de Arqueología, vol. 45–47, 1972–1974, p. 223-235
- The Art of Medieval Spain: A. D. 500 - 1200, Metropolitan Museum of Art, 1993, 358 p. (ISBN 9780810964334), p. 161-162
- (in French) John Williams, Manuscrits espagnols du Haut Moyen Âge, Chêne, 1977, 119 p. (ISBN 2851081470), p. 35 and 55-61
