= Al-Dumayr =

Dumeir ضمير Dumayr
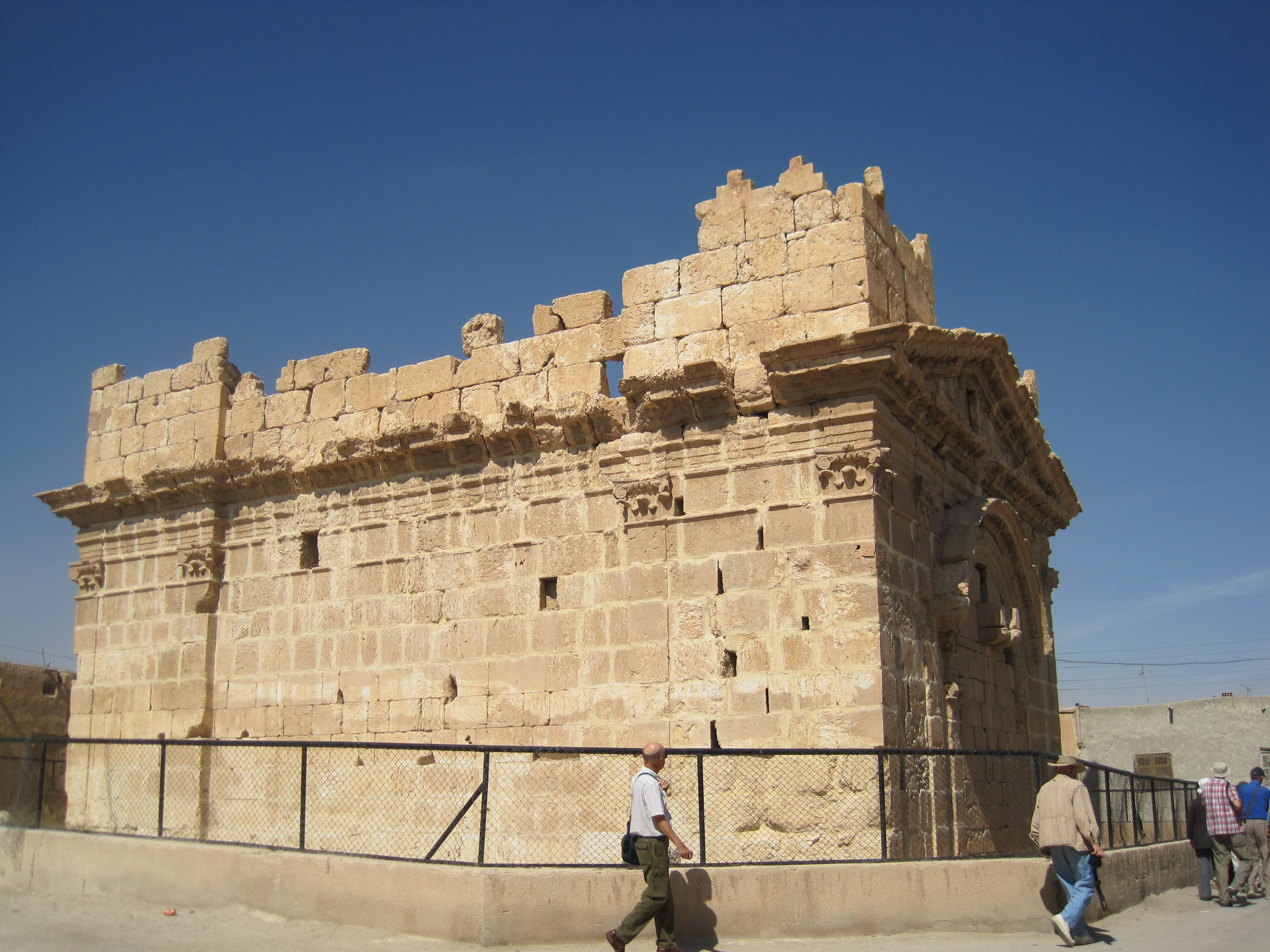
- Temple of Zeus Hypsistos, Dumeir

- Location in Syria
- Coordinates: 33°38′31″N 36°41′34″E
- Country: Syria
- Governorate: Rif Dimashq
- District: Douma
- Subdistrict: al-Dumayr
- Elevation: 675 m (2,215 ft)

Population (2004)
  - Total: 24,223
- Time zone: UTC+3 (EET)
  - Summer (DST): UTC+2 (EEST)

Dumeir, also Dumair, Damir and Dumayr (Arabic: الضمير) is a city located 45 kilometers north-east of Damascus, Syria.

== Archaeology ==
An altar dedicated to the Semitic deity, Baalshamin in 94 CE, now in the Institut du Monde Arabe in Paris, indicates that a Nabatean religious building previously stood on the site.

There is a reference to a building in a lawsuit in 216, however in 245 CE, in the reign of the Roman Emperor Philip the Arab, the Roman Temple of Dumeir, located in the center of the old town, was dedicated to Zeus Hypsistos. The shape is highly unusual, and construction may have commenced as a public fountain or staging post, but in its final form it is clearly a temple.

It was fortified in the Arab period, the arch on the rear wall being filled in with stones and defensive devices. The temple has been restored as the result of much research and reconstruction work.

The Ghassanid phylarch (tribal king) al-Mundhir III ibn al-Harith built a tower at Dumayr. A Greek inscription engraved by al-Mundhir credits himself for its construction and thanks God and St. Julian. A monastery associated with the Ghassanids called Dayr al-Matirun, likely an Arabicized version of the Greek martyrion, existed about 3 kilometers (1.9 mi) east of Dumayr.

== Facilities ==
A cemetery was built in 1960 for the French casualties of WWI and WWII in Al-Dumayr. The Syrian Arab Air Force Al-Dumayr Military Airport is also located in Al-Dumayr.

== See also ==
- Al-Dumayr offensive (April 2016)
- Desert castles - the Al-Dumayr qasr possibly dates to the Byzantine period, maybe built by the Ghassanids, but might be Umayyad as well

== Bibliography ==
- Shahid, Irfan (2002). Byzantium and the Arabs, Volume 2, Part 1. Washington, D. C.: Dumbarton Oaks Research Library and Collection.
