= Moralia in Job (British Library, Add MS 31031) =

8th century illuminated manuscript

Beginning of the manuscript

British Library, Add MS 31031 is an 8th-century illuminated copy of Gregory the Great's Moralia in Job, books I–V. The codex is missing the last folio and ends in the words "et singuli tota". The manuscript is written in Merovingian script on vellum. It has 145 folios. The manuscript has colored initials and titles. In the 15th century it belonged to Ottobeuren Abbey in Bavaria.
