= Statue of Hercules, Dura-Europos =

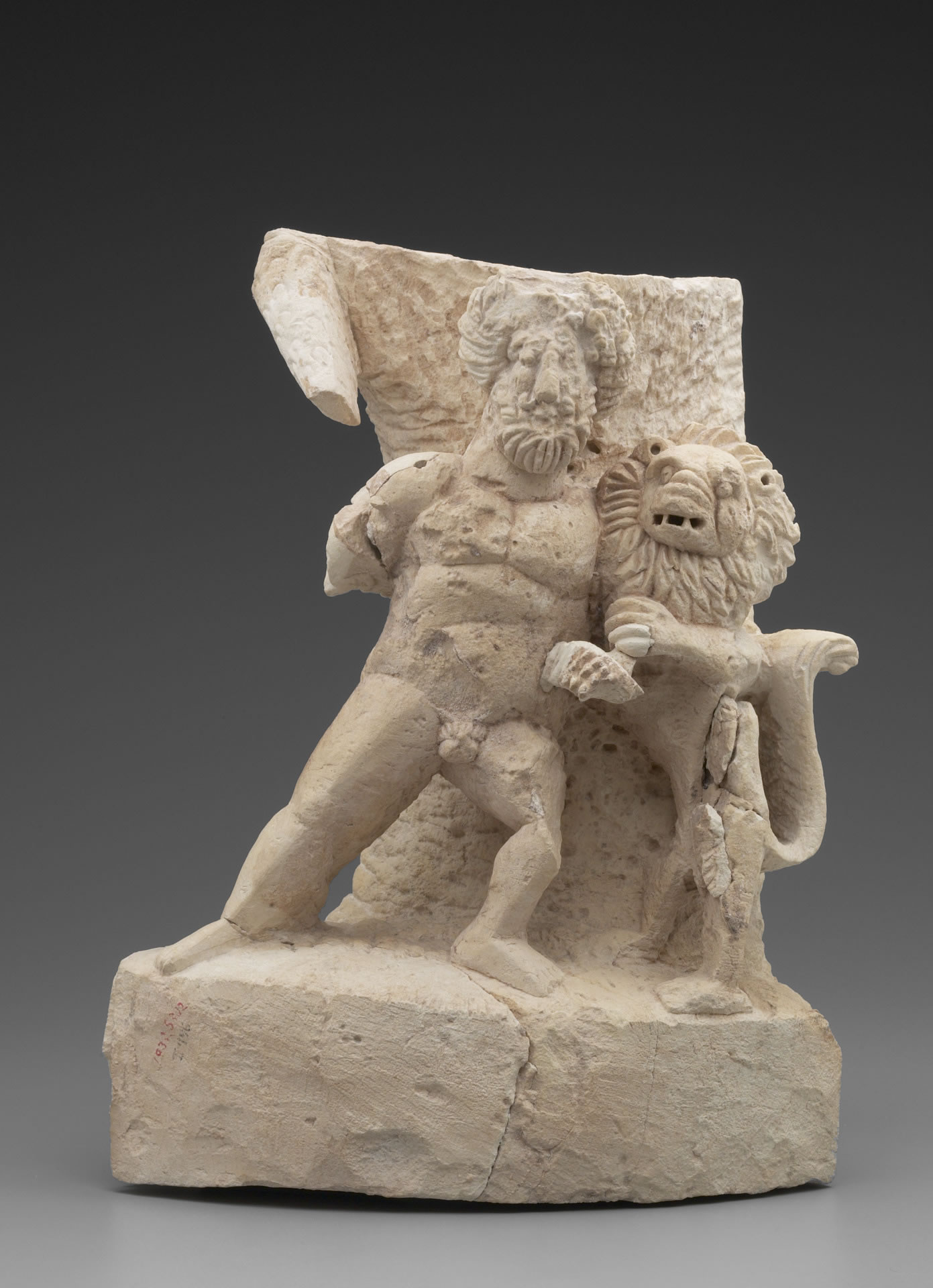
Statue of Hercules, Yale University Art Gallery 1938.5302

The Statue of Hercules (Yale Art Gallery 1938.5302) was discovered in the Temple of Zeus Megistos in Dura-Europos during the 1935–1937 excavations undertaken by Yale University and the French Academy. The statue dates from the period of Roman rule at Dura-Europos (AD 160–256). It is now in the possession of the Yale Art Gallery.

The statue is made out of limestone and is about 50 cm high, 40 cm wide, and 30 cm deep. Hercules is depicted frontally, holding a lion in a head lock with his left arm, although his legs are depicted in a side view. His right arm and left knee have been broken off, as has part of the lion's head and its paws. Anatomical details of Hercules' body are mostly indicated only by engraved lines. His legs are excessively thick in comparison to the rest of his body. The modelling is pretty schematic: his feet are simply flat rectangles. His genitalia have been damaged, but his pubic hair is still visible, cut into the stone. The shape of the base shows that the sculpture was intended to sit in the corner of a room. This is confirmed by the remains of plaster found on the back side of the work.

The statue is a depiction of Hercules' victory over the Nemean Lion. Images of Hercules were relatively common at Dura-Europos. Around 42 examples were found during the excavations of the city, including five examples of him with the Nemean Lion. The fondness for this motif may go back to eastern ideas of the lion-slaying hero, a motif with a long tradition in Mesopotamian art. There are depictions of Gilgamesh battling with a lion, going back to the third millennium BC. A particularly famous example is known from Persepolis.

The statue was probably made along with other statues and reliefs in a workshop in Dura-Europos, which also produced other statues of Hercules with similar features, all of which are made of white limestone. Other sculptures at Dura-Europos conform to the style and design of works from Palmyra and are generally of better quality, while the products of this workshop work generally very plump and ungainly. The frontality of the statue is typical of Parthian art.

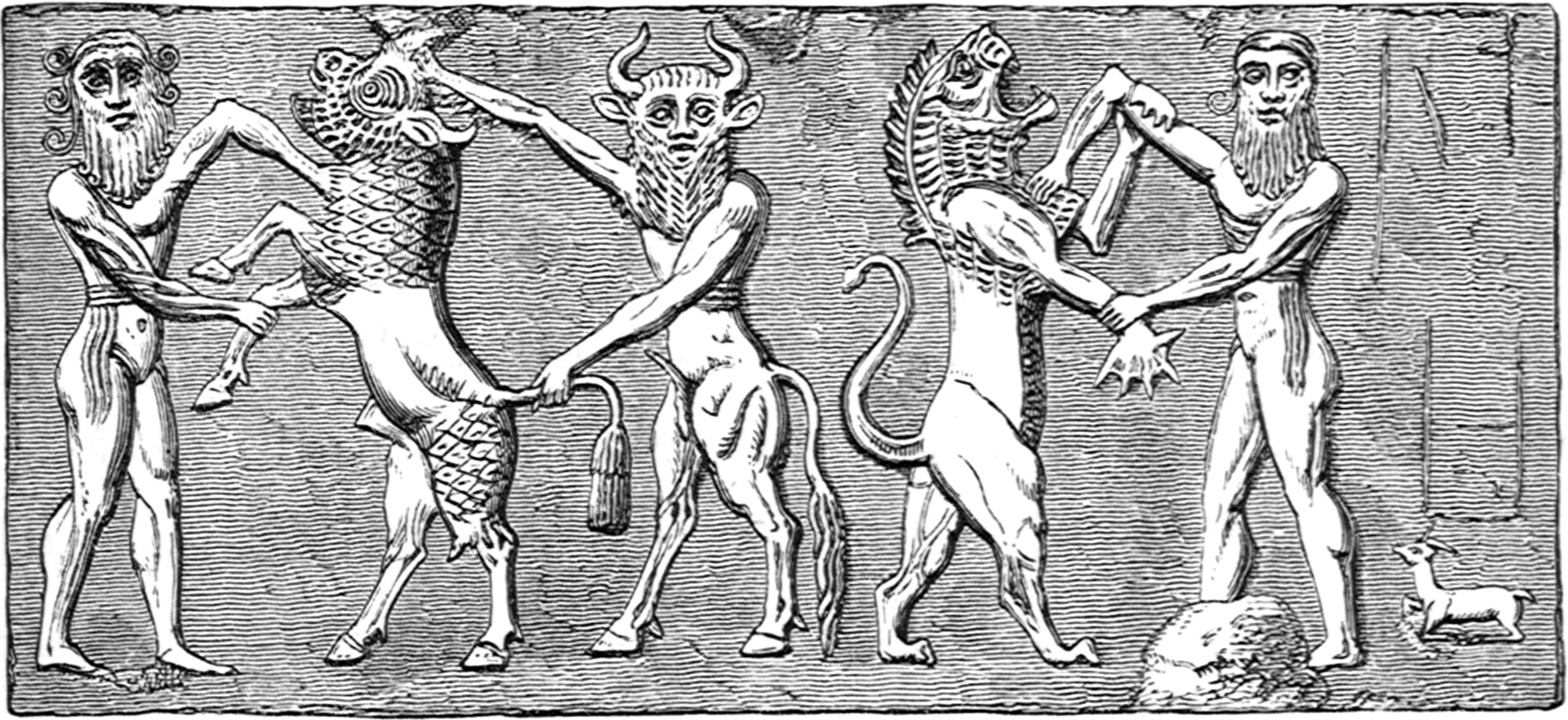
Gilgamesh fighting a lion

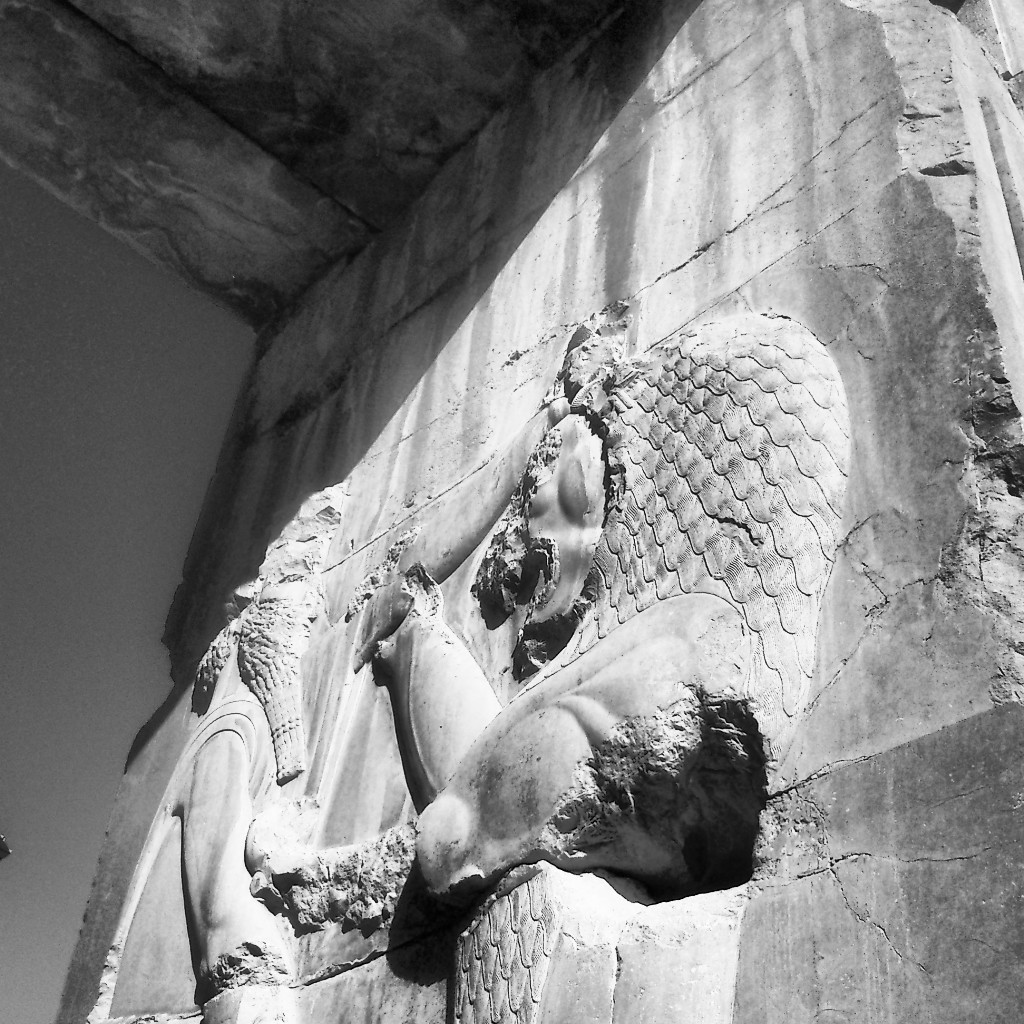
Lion-slayer at Persepolis

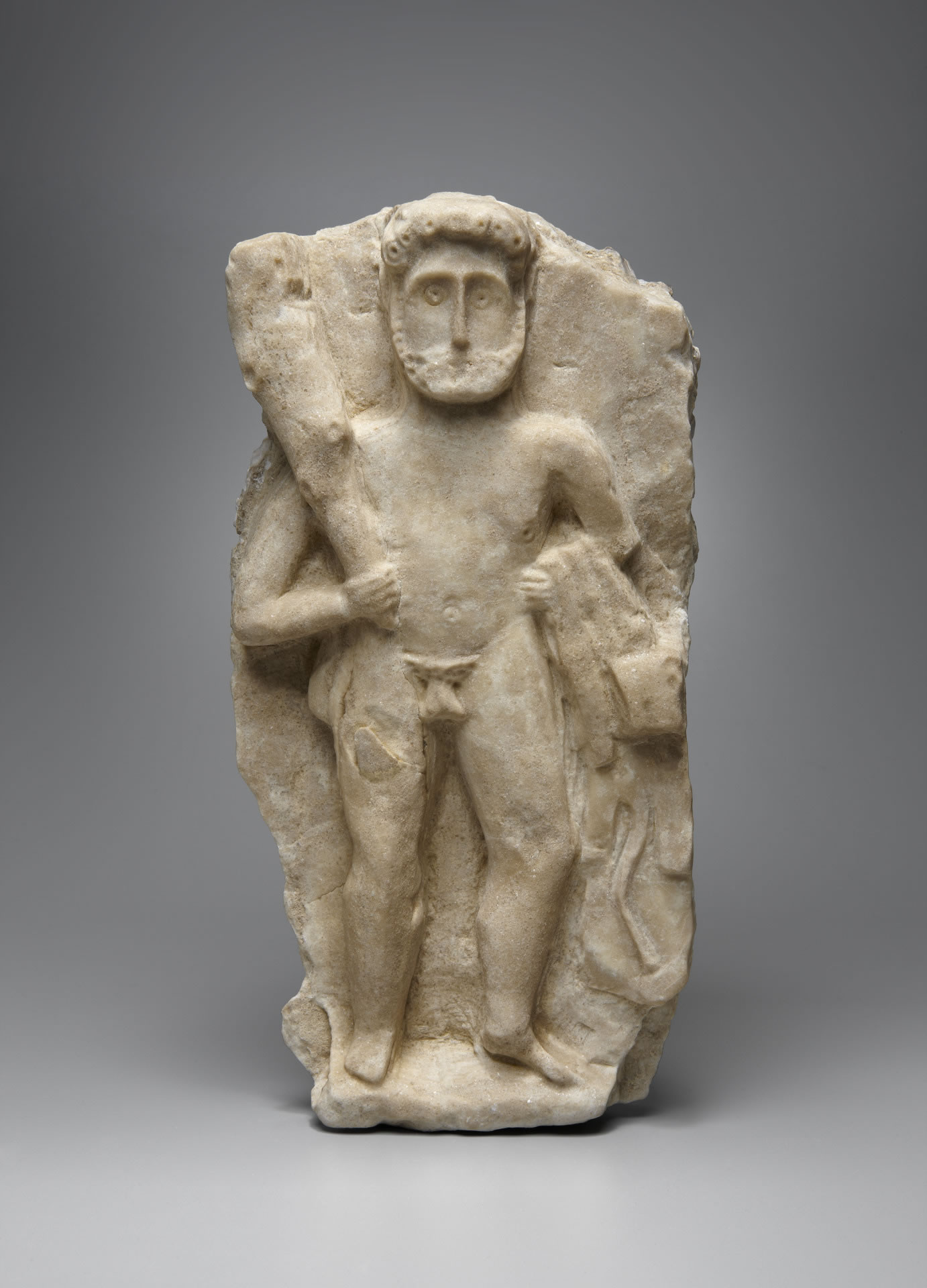
Relief depicting Hercules, Dura-Europos; local, provincial style

== Bibliography ==
- Susan B. Downey: "The Heracles Sculpture" in The Excavations at Dura-Europos: Final Report III, Part I, Fascicle 1, New Haven 1969, pp. 29–30. no. 31. Tafel XII
- Lucinda Dirven, "Strangers and Sojouners: the Religious Behavior of Palmyrenes and other Foreigners in Dura-Europos," in Lisa R. Brody, Gail L. Hoffman (ed.): Dura Europos, Crossroads of Antiquity. Boston 2011, ISBN 978-1-892850-16-4, S. 354, Nr. 47
