= Moralia in Job =

Commentary on the Book of Job by Pope Gregory I

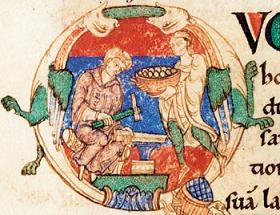
An illuminated initial from Gregory's Commentary on Job, Abbey of Saint-Pierre at Préaux, Normandy

Moralia in Job ("Morals in Job"), also called Moralia, sive Expositio in Job ("Morals, or Narration about Job") or Magna Moralia ("Great Morals"), is a commentary on the Book of Job by Gregory the Great, written between 578 and 595. It was begun when Gregory was at the court of Emperor Tiberius II in Constantinople, but finished only several years after he had returned to Rome. It is Gregory's major work, filling some 35 books or 6 volumes. Its actual title is "An Extensive Consideration of Moral Questions".

== Manuscripts ==
- Moralia in Job (British Library, Add MS 31031) (late 8th century)
- Commentary on Job of 945
- Cîteaux Moralia in Job (1111)

== Editions ==
- Basel: Nicolaus Kesler, Basel (1496)
- Patrologia Latina, volumes 75–76.
- English translation in Library of the Fathers (4 vols., Oxford, 1844)
