= Temple of Zeus Hypsistos =

Ancient Roman temple in Syria

- معبد ضمير (Arabic)
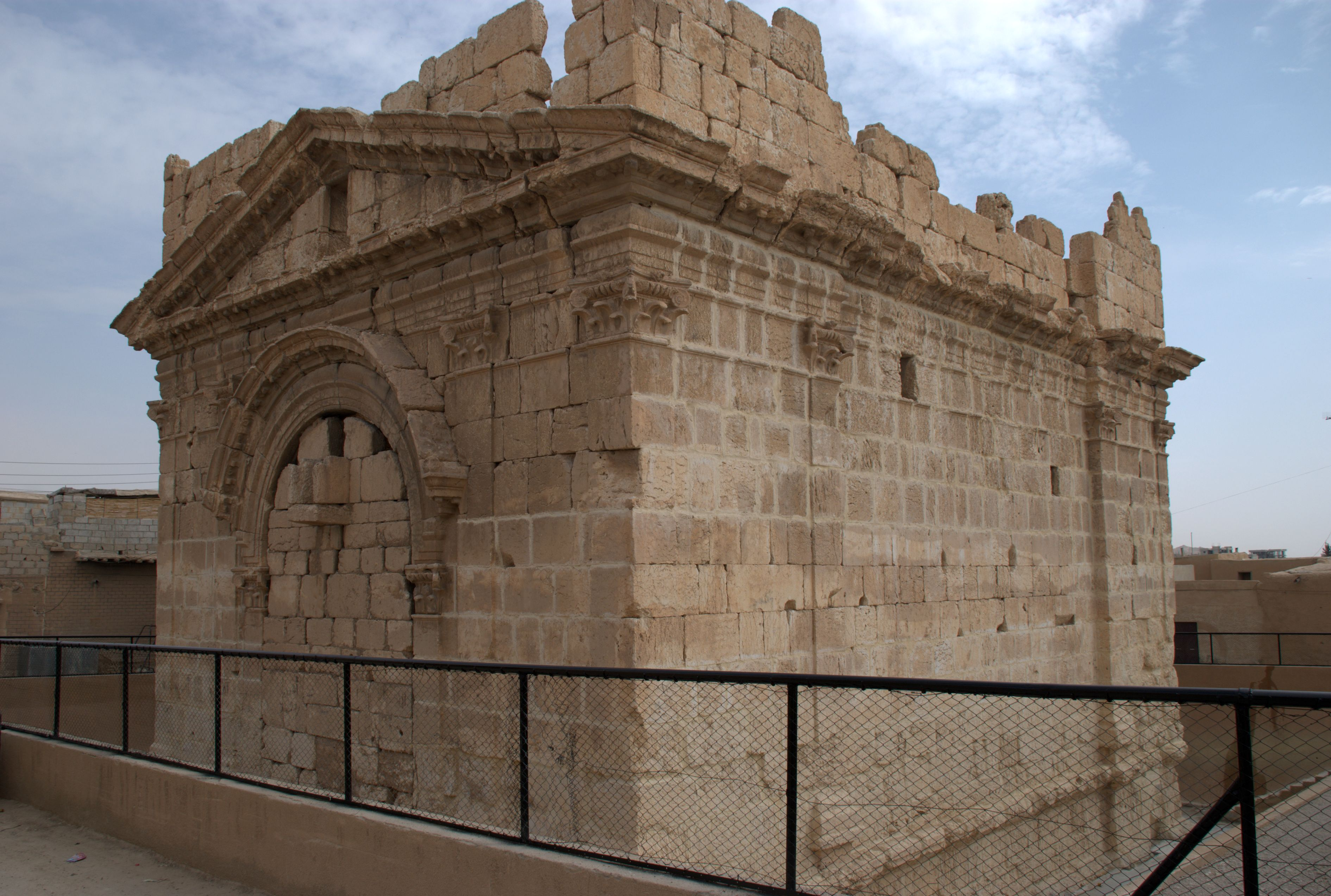
- The Temple's exterior

- Location within Syria
- 33°38′24″N 36°41′20″E
- Type: Temple
- Cultures: Roman
- Location: Al-Dumayr, Syria

Site notes
- Material: Limestone
- Condition: Intact
- Owner: Public
- Public access: Yes

The Temple of Zeus Hypsistos is an ancient Roman temple dedicated to the god Zeus, located in the present day town of Al-Dumayr, Syria, located 45 km north-east of Damascus, and known historically as Thelsea.

== History ==
While its construction date is unknown, it was probably a Nabatean building, likely converted to a temple around the 2nd century.

In one of its inscriptions, it mentions a case heard by Emperor Caracalla in Antioch around 216, about the corruption in the temple's priesthood.

To the peasants, the case is over matters of piety, to you nothing is more important than piety. So now they have confidence in the present instance in engaging in a case before a most pious king and judge. There is a famous temple of Zeus in their territory, which is visited by people from all the neighbouring regions. They go there, and arrange processions to it. Here is the first wrong committed by our adversary. He enjoys [immunity from taxation and] exemption from liturgies, wears a golden crown, enjoys [precedence], has taken the sceptre in his hand and has proclaimed himself the priest of Zeus.

== Gallery ==
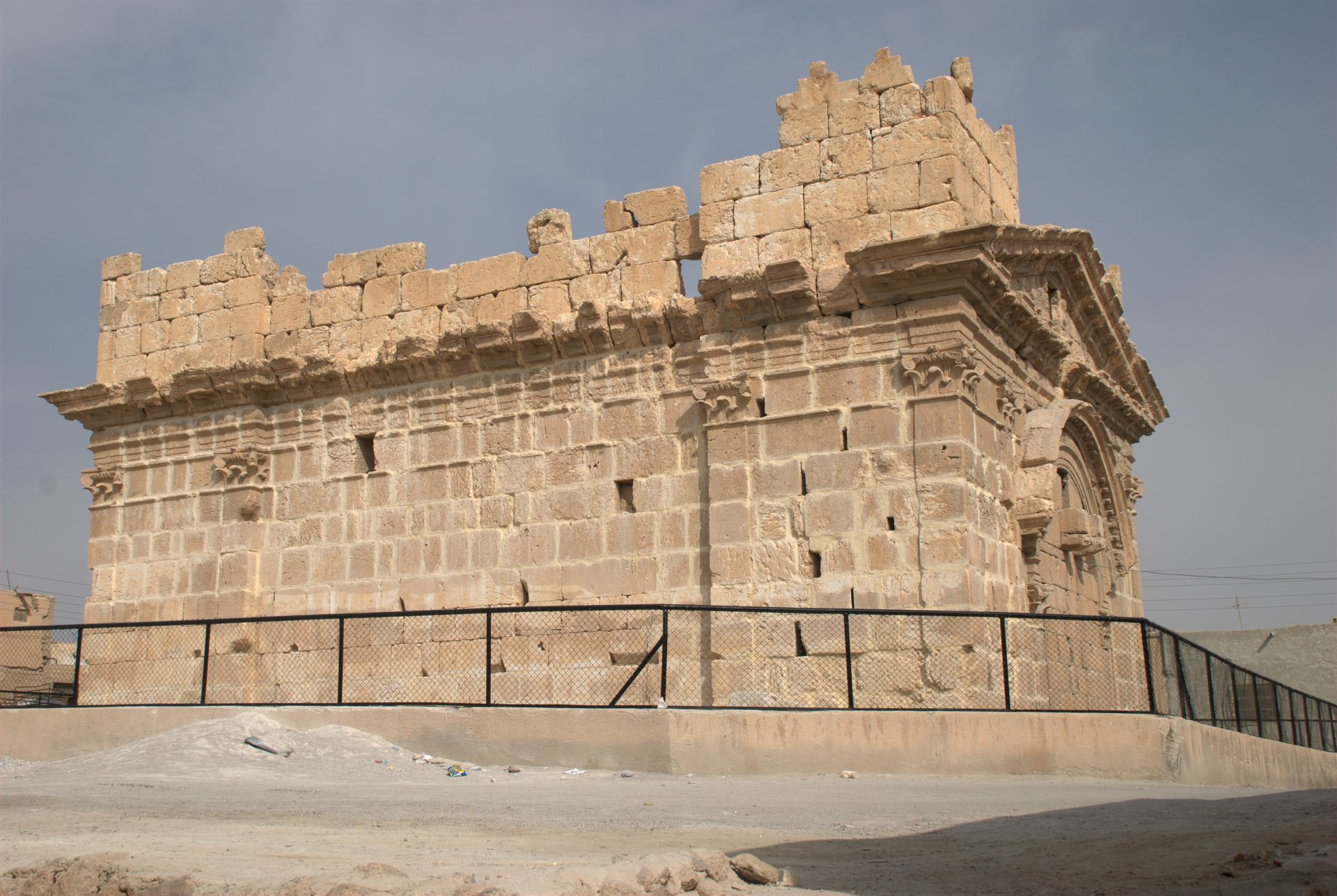
The temple's exterior viewed from the south

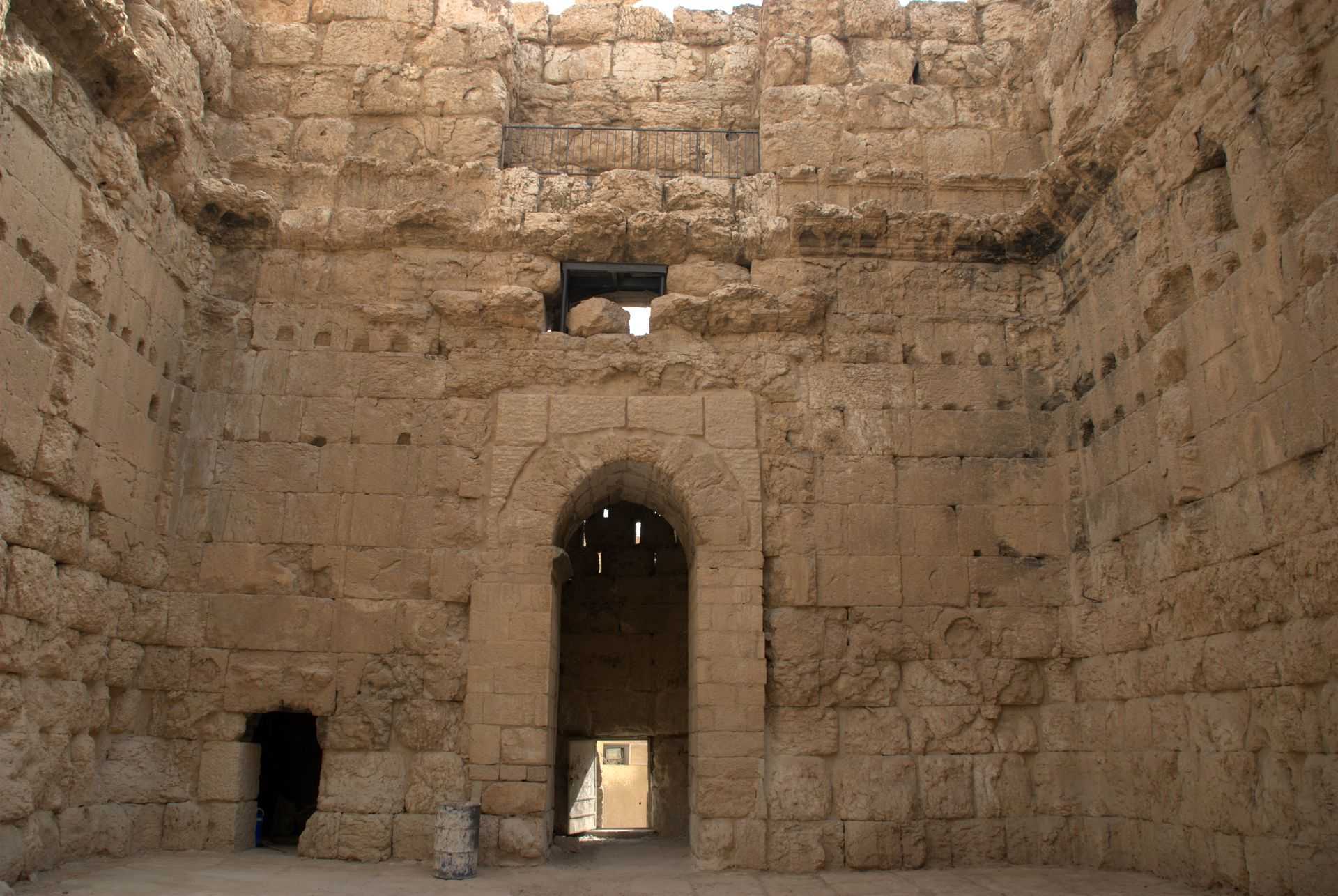
The temple's interior

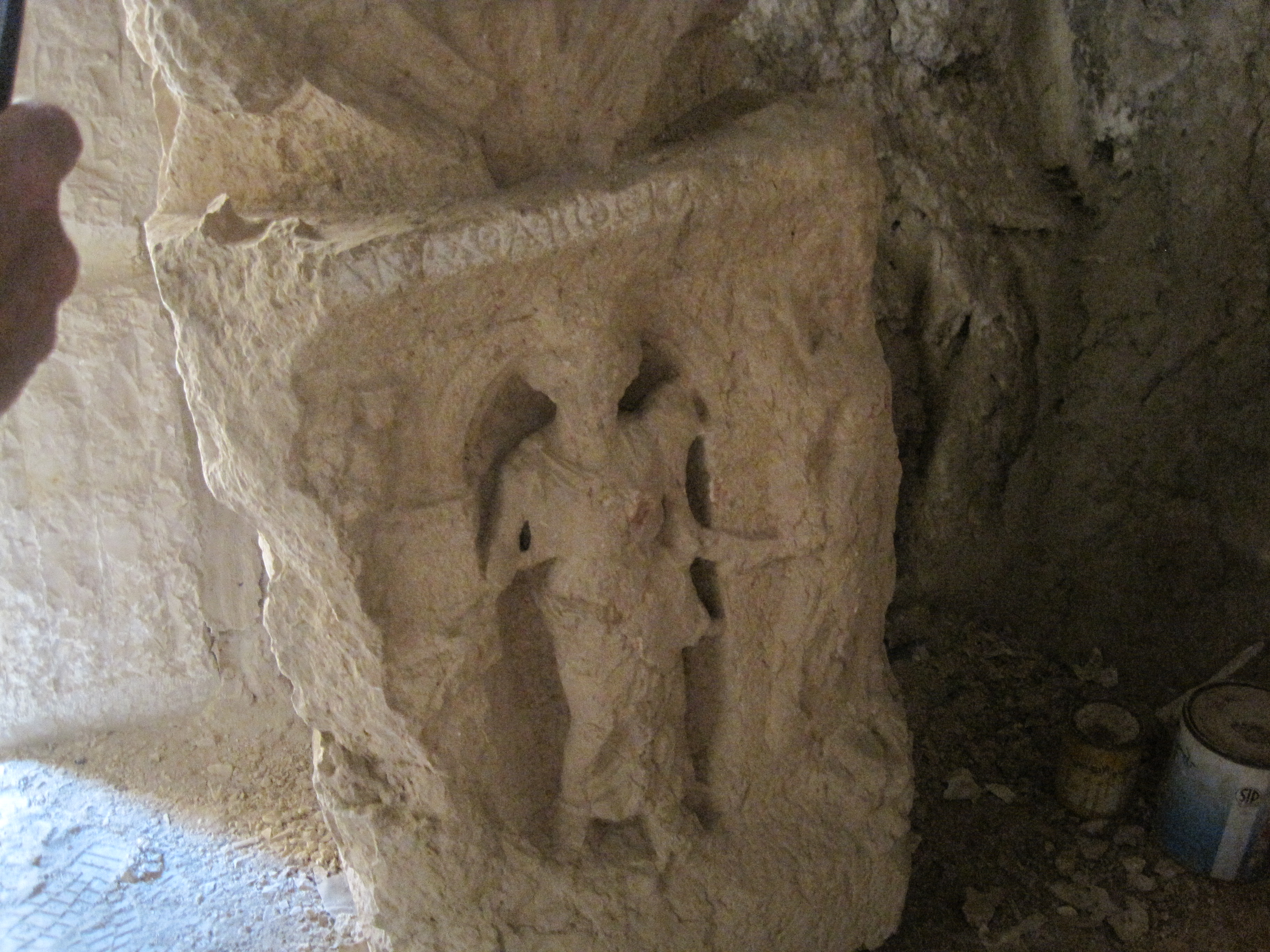
Detail of a relief in its interior

== Sources ==
- Millar, Fergus (1993). The Roman Near East, 31 B.C.-A.D. 337. p. 317. ISBN 0674778863.
