= Temple of Zeus Theos, Dura-Europos =

Ancient Greek temple

Coordinates: 34.746914°N 40.730929°E

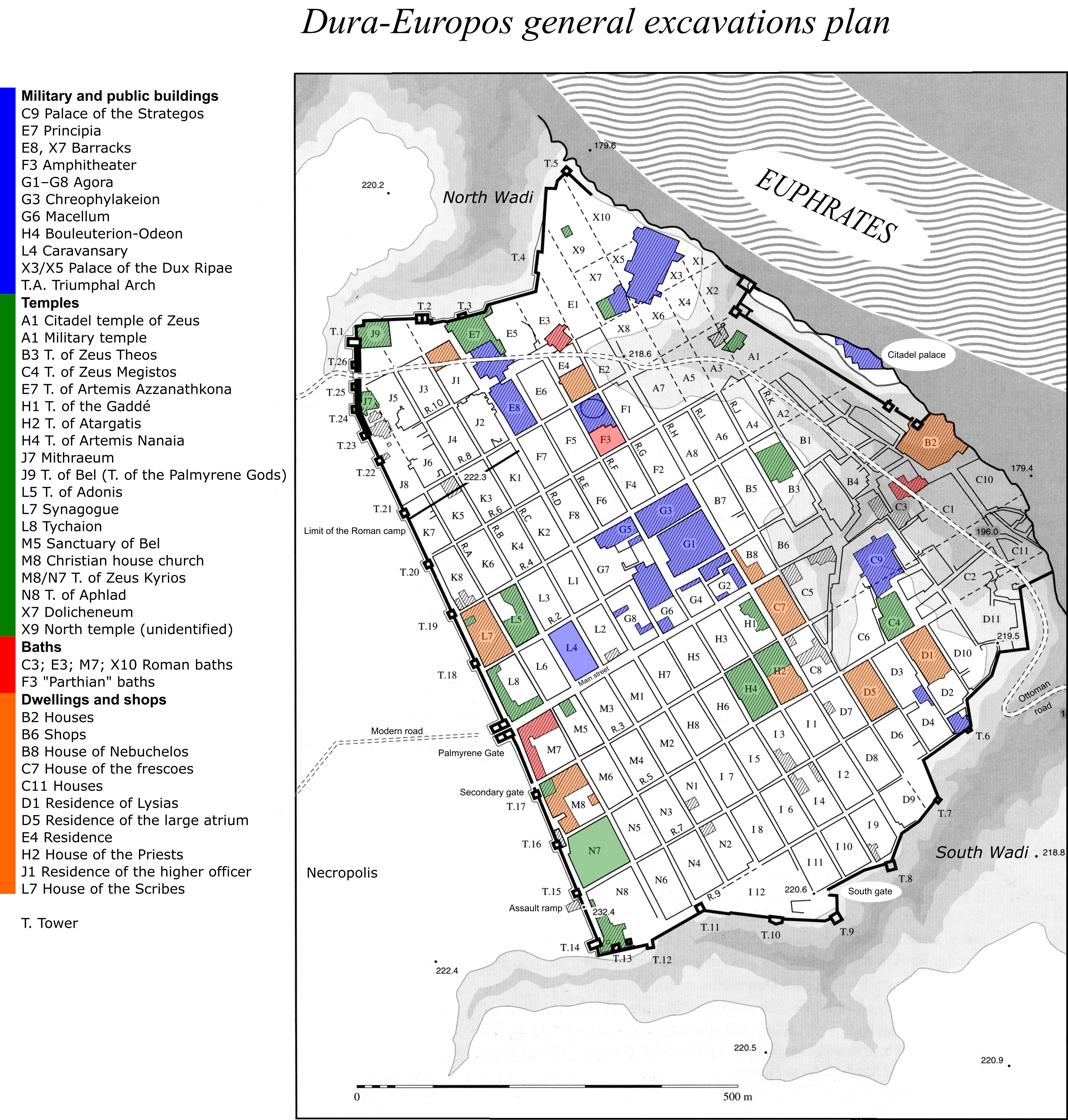
Dura-Europos general excavations plan, Temple of Zeus Theos is marked as B3

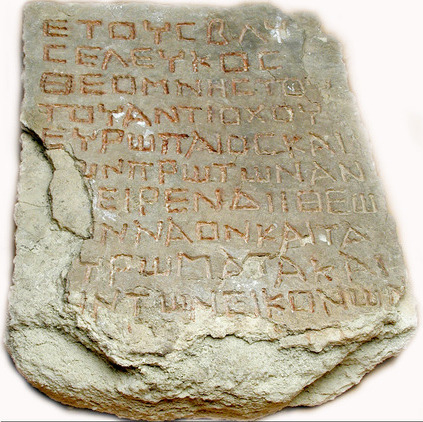
Dedicatory inscription from AD 120/121

The Temple of Zeus Theos at Dura Europos was built in the second century AD and was among the most important sanctuaries of the city. The structure was located in the centre of the settlement. It had an area of around 37 m^{2} and took up half an insula. It was excavated by an American-French team between December 1933 and March 1939.

== Description ==
The entrance to the temple was on the east side. Above it was an inscription which named the builder as one Seleukos and the year of construction as AD 114. The excavators interpreted the inscription as referring to the completion of the exterior ("public") portions of the complex. The early second-century date is usually accepted for the construction of the temple as a whole. The temple complex contained a monumental court, within which there was a large Naos. On the north and south sides of the court there was a series of rooms, most with benches lining all the walls. It shares these features in common with other Parthian-era religious buildings at Dura.

The Naos was located on the west side of the court as a free-standing structure. It had four rooms. The largest was the cella. This had wall paintings which were found in tiny fragments but were able to be largely reconstructed. On the back wall, the cult image of the god was depicted. He stood next to a chariot and was crowned by Nike.

On the side walls of the hall, there were three registers of images of the donors who had financed this temple and their family members. Their names were written next to their images. They appear to be the members of two influential families, one of which is known as the family of Lysias. Several inscriptions were found, all in Greek. Next to the cella was a smaller room, which was probably the temple treasury. Some gemstones were found here. A dedicatory inscription on a stele is dated AD 120/121 and was dedicated by one Seleukos.

== Bibliography ==
- Baird, J. (2018). Dura-Europos. London: Bloomsbury.
- Rostovtzeff, M. I., F. E. Brown, C. B. Welles (1939). The excavations at Dura-Europos: Preliminary Report of Seventh and Eighth Season of Work 1933–1934 and 1934–1935. New Haven: Yale University Press, New Haven, pp. 181–217.
