= Tordómar =

Coordinates: 42°03′N 3°52′W

- Municipality and town
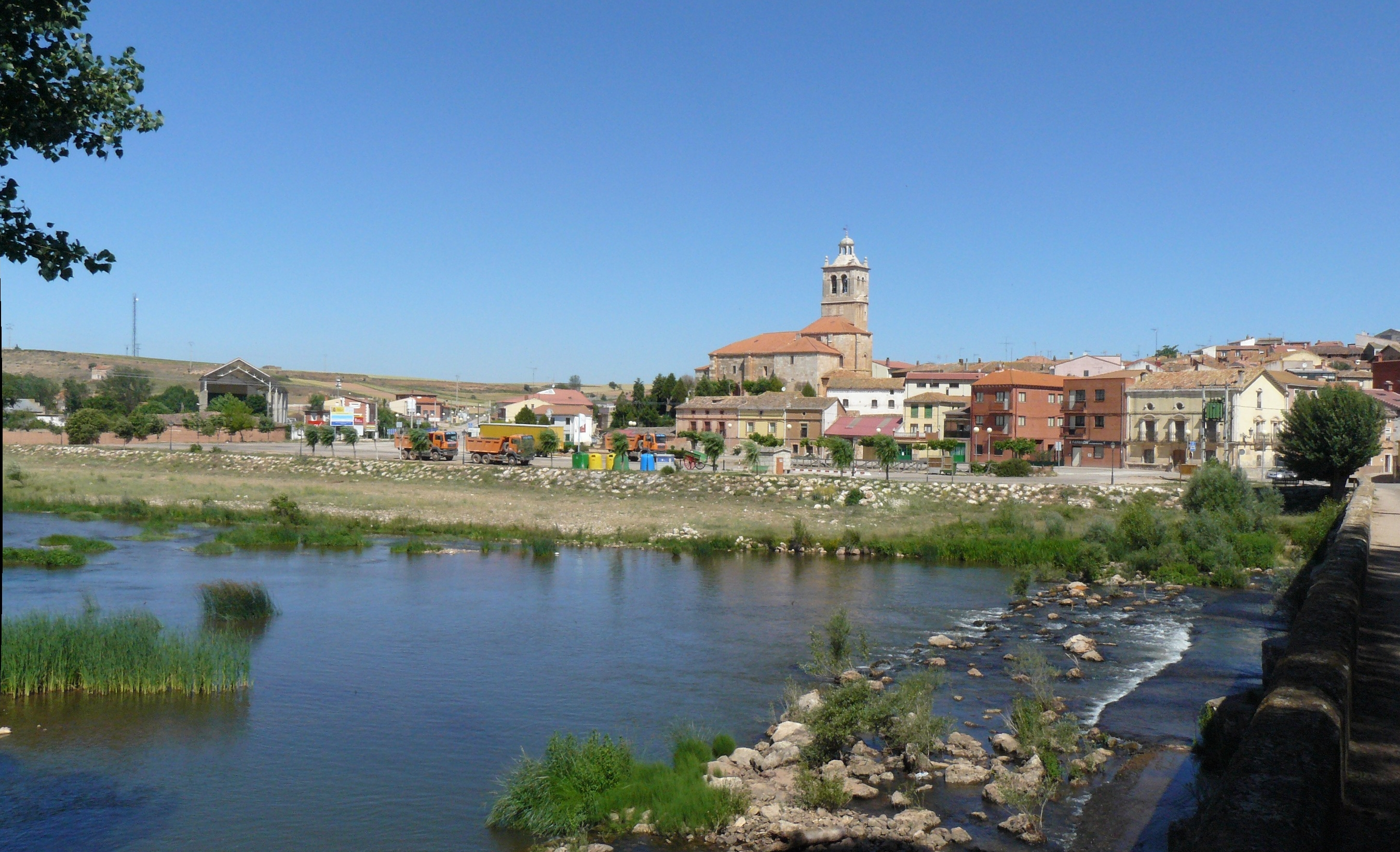
- View of Tordómar from the Arlanza river Roman bridge, 2008

- Coat of arms
- Interactive map of Tordómar
- Country: Spain
- Autonomous community: Castile and León
- Province: Burgos
- Comarca: Arlanza

Area
  - Total: 30 km^{2} (12 sq mi)

Population (2025-01-01)
  - Total: 290
  - Density: 9.7/km^{2} (25/sq mi)
- Time zone: UTC+1 (CET)
  - Summer (DST): UTC+2 (CEST)
- Postal code: 09341
- Website: http://www.tordomar.es/

Tordómar is a municipality and town located in the province of Burgos, Castile and León, Spain. According to the 2004 census (INE), the municipality has a population of 351 inhabitants.
