= Doliche =

Doliche can refer to several places in antiquity, including:

Cities

- Doliche (Thessaly), a city of ancient Thessaly, Greece
- Dolichi, a modern town located near to the site of the ancient city of Thessaly, Greece
- Doliche (Commagene), an ancient city of Asia Minor; modern Dülük near Gaziantep, Turkey

Islands

- Doliche, also called Dolichiste, an island off the coast of Lycia, now called Kekova Adası, in Antalya Province, Turkey
- Doliche, also called Dulichium, the chief island of the Echinades, off the coast of Acarnania, Greece
- Doliche, also called Zenobii, was a classical name of the Khuriya Muriya Islands, in Oman
- Doliche was an archaic synonym for the island of Crete, Greece
