= Dolicheneum =

Coordinates: 34.751342°N 40.728794°E

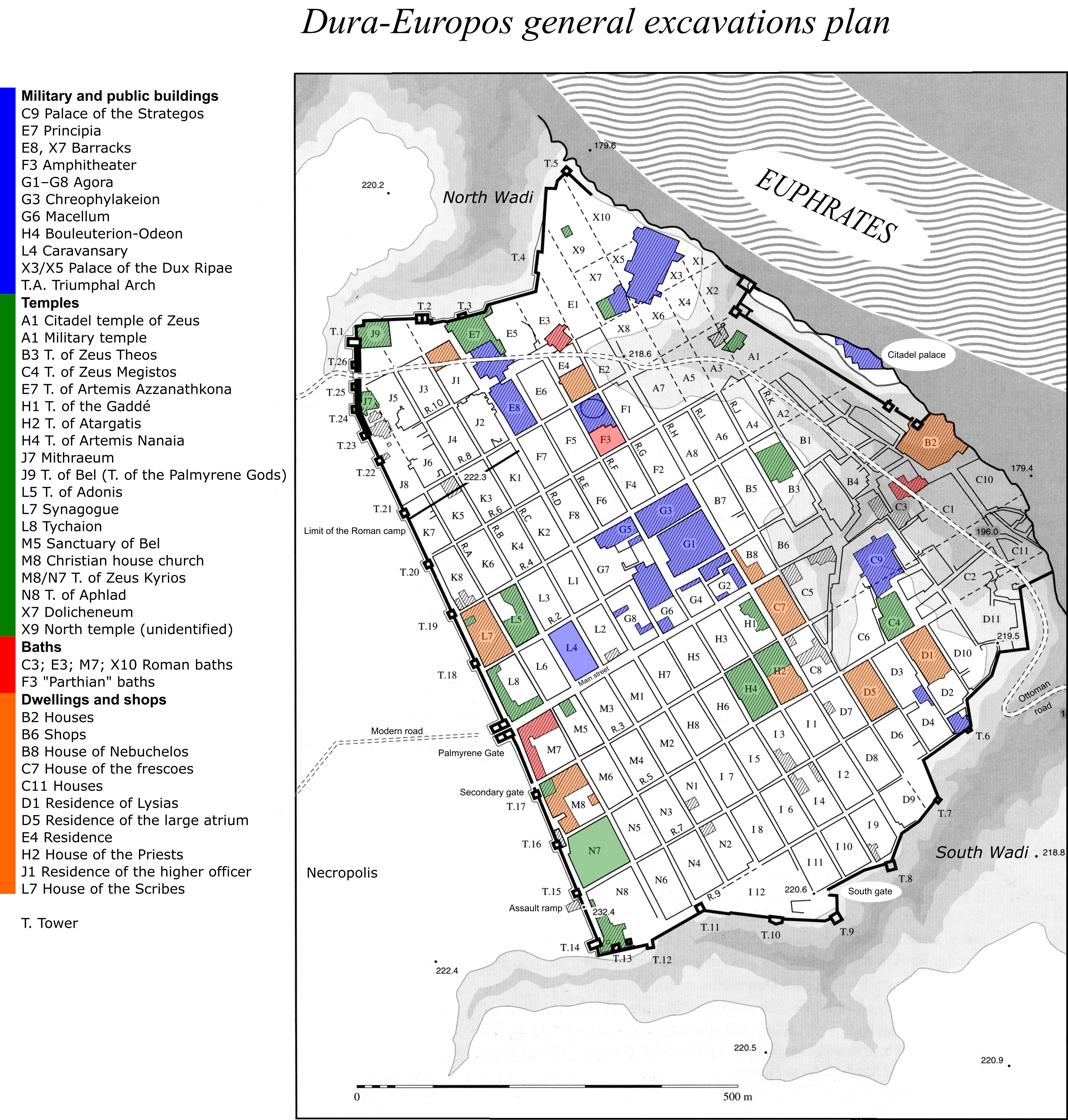
Dura-Europos general excavations plan, Dolicheneum marked as X7

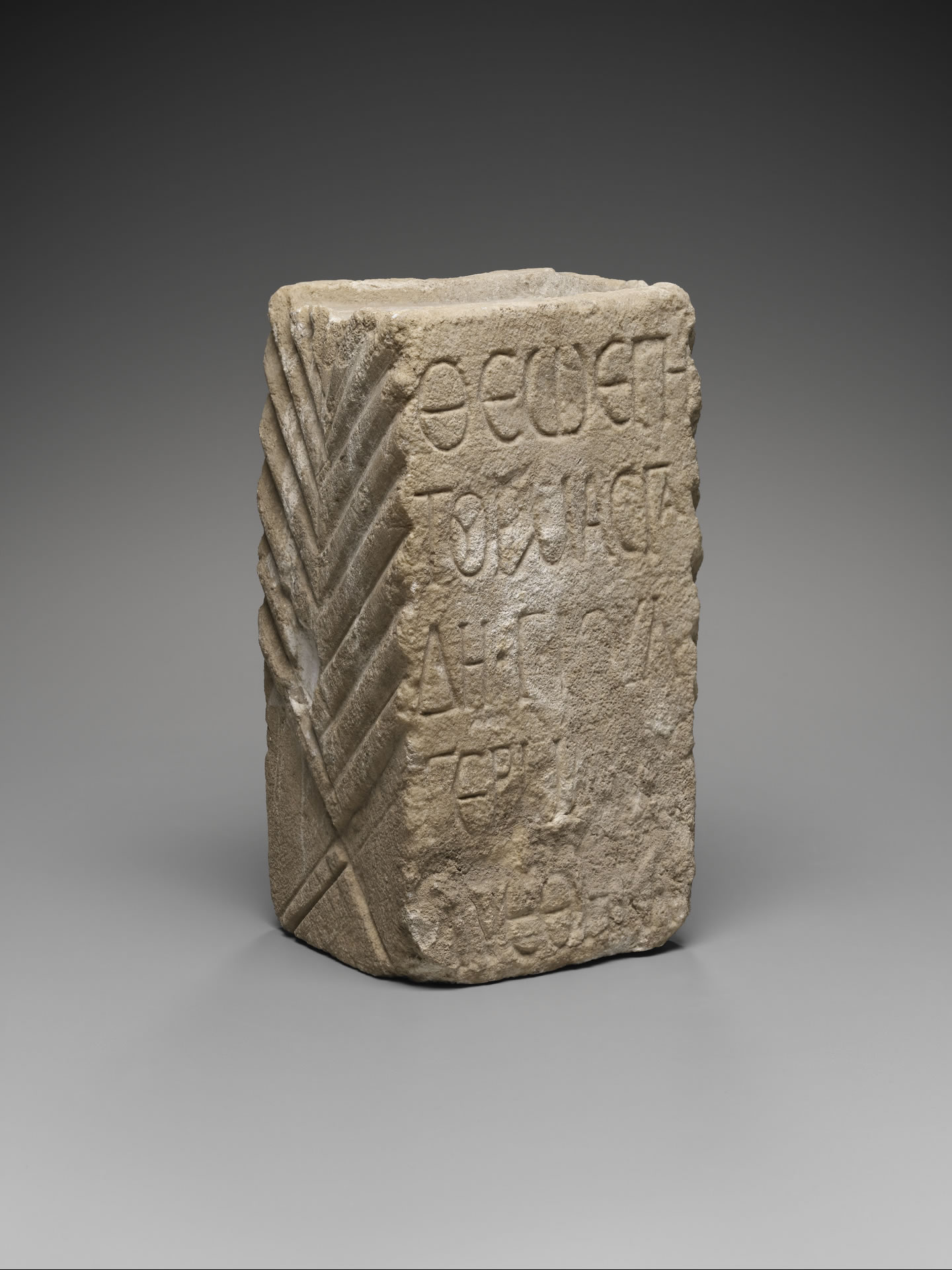
Altar of Turmasgade

The so-called Dolicheneum is a temple in Dura Europos in the east of today's Syria, where Jupiter Dolichenus and god called Zeus Helios Mithras Turmasgade may have been worshiped. The remains of the temple were excavated in 1935/36, but results were never fully published.

The temple entrance is in the south. The building had a columned courtyard with two altars. Behind it were two cellae. The temple was therefore dedicated to two deities. Various rooms were arranged around the courtyard, some of them had benches along the walls. Remnants of wall paintings were also found in one room. Various inscriptions were discovered in and around the temple. One cellae was dedicated to little-known god Turmasgade. Second cellae was for Jupiter Dolichenus, several dedications for whom were found in the temple. Another room was dedicated for unnamed goddess, probably Juno Dolichena. The temple was built by units of Roman army near 211 AD, and was in use until 256 AD. It was used mainly by Roman soldiers stationed in the city. Soldiers left several inscriptions that mentions "centurio princeps of a vexillation of IV (Scythia) and XVI Flavia Firma, a vexillation of Cohors II Paphlagonum with the titles 'Galliana Volusiana', a cohors equitata with the same titles, and Julius Julianus, of A.D. 251".
