= Heddernheim =

- Quarter of Frankfurt am Main
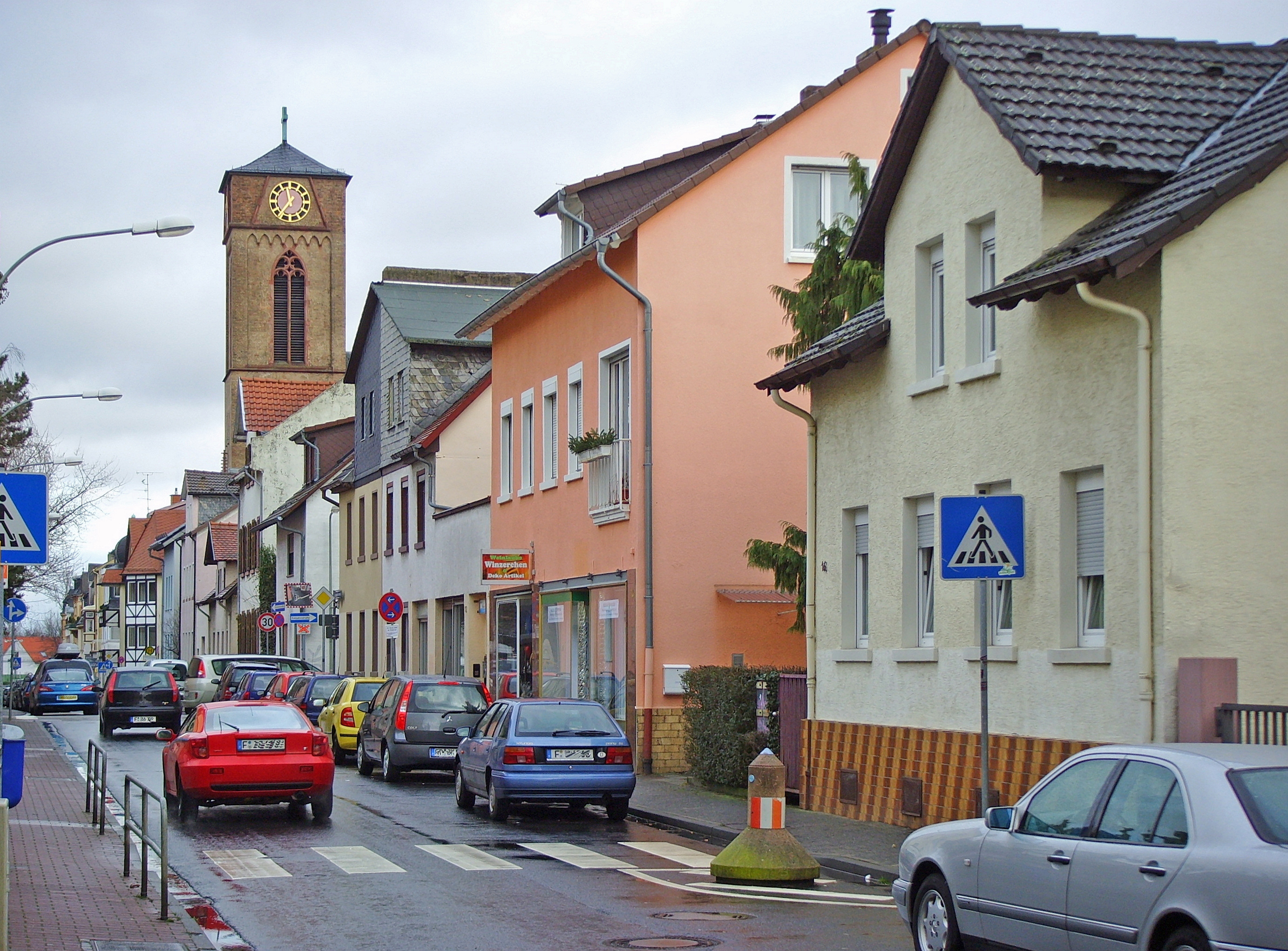
- Typical street

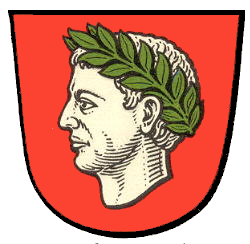
- Coat of arms

- Location of Heddernheim (red) and the Ortsbezirk Nord-West (light red) within Frankfurt am Main
- Interactive map of Heddernheim
- Location within Germany Location within Hesse
- Coordinates: 50°09′55″N 08°38′50″E
- Country: Germany
- State: Hesse
- Admin. region: Darmstadt
- District: Urban district
- City: Frankfurt am Main

Area
  - Total: 2.488 km^{2} (0.961 sq mi)

Population (2020-12-31)
  - Total: 17,073
  - Density: 6,862/km^{2} (17,770/sq mi)
- Time zone: UTC+01:00 (CET)
  - Summer (DST): UTC+02:00 (CEST)
- Postal codes: 60439
- Dialling codes: 069
- Vehicle registration: F
- Website: www.heddernheim.de

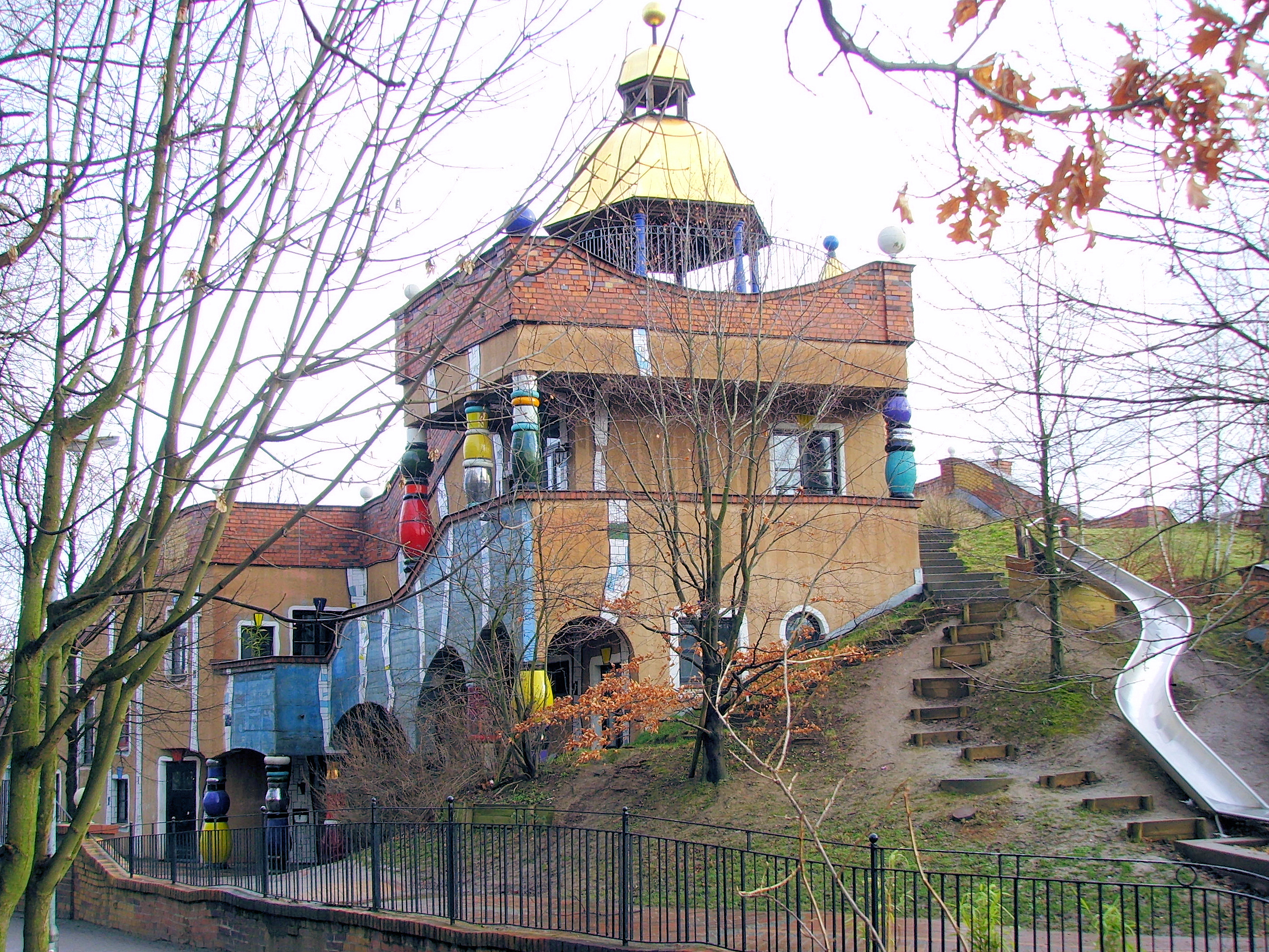
Hundertwasser-Kindergarten

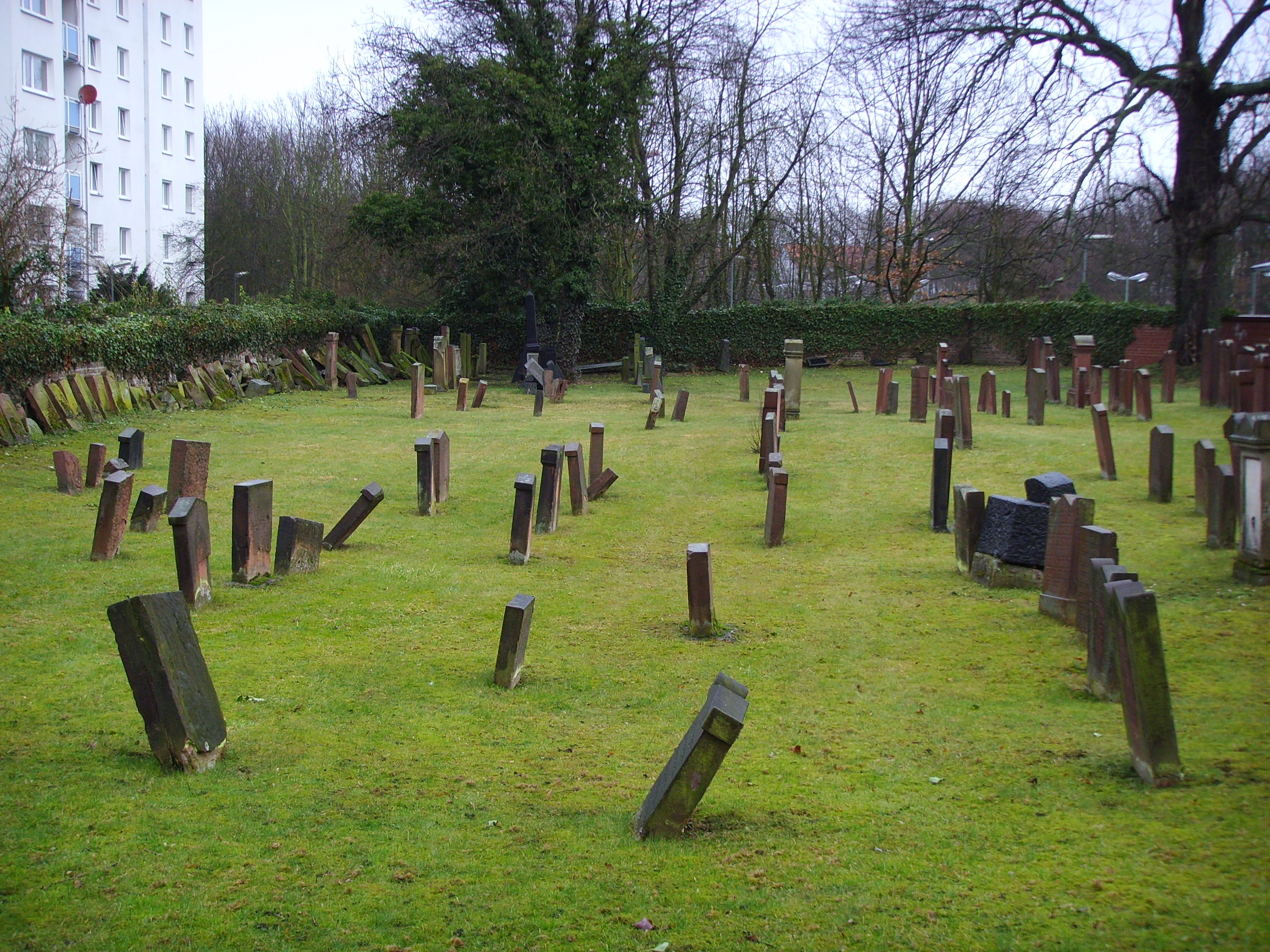
19th/20th century Jewish cemetery

Heddernheim (German pronunciation: [ˈhɛdɐnhaɪm]) is a quarter of Frankfurt am Main, Germany. It is part of the Ortsbezirk Nord-West and is subdivided into the Stadtbezirke Heddernheim-Ost and Heddernheim-West.

== History ==
=== Antiquity ===
The Roman town of Nida was situated in the south-western part of Heddernheim.

There have been three Mithraea (temples to Mithras) discovered at Heddernheim. A hoard of silver votive plaques was discovered in the Roman settlement of Nida near Heddernheim in the nineteenth century, some of which are in the British Museum. The offerings appear to have been deposited in a shrine dedicated to the Roman God of Jupiter Dolichenus.

=== Middle Ages ===
Heddernheim was first mentioned in documents in 801 AD as Phetterenheim.

=== Modern history ===
In Heddernheim there has been plants for metalworking from the mid 19th century to the 1970s, including a huge plant of Vereinigte Deutsche Metallwerke. Meanwhile a big housing estate was built, named Nordweststadt, including a shopping center called Nordwestzentrum, and Mertonviertel.

During World War II, in 1942, a forced labour camp was established in the district by the Nazis. Due to American advance, in 1945, it was dissolved and its prisoners were deported to the Buchenwald concentration camp.

== Subway stations ==
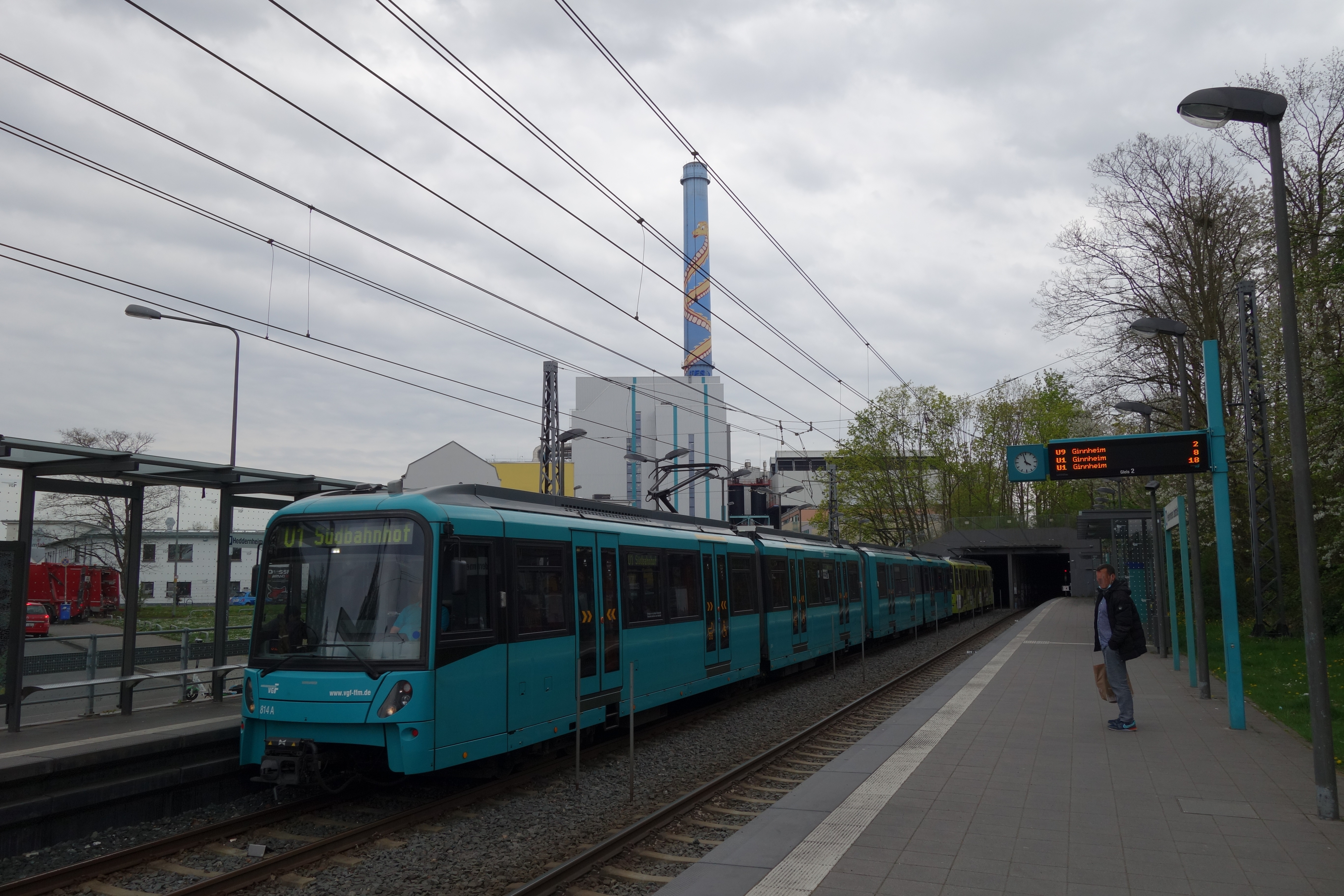
Subway station Heddernheimer Landstraße near the tunnel to the shopping center Nordwestzentrum, incineration plant in the back.

In Heddernheim there are six stations of the Frankfurt U-Bahn: Heddernheim, Zeilweg, Sandelmühle, Heddernheimer Landstraße, Nordwestzentrum and Römerstadt. They are serving five lines: U1, U2, U3, U8 and U9.
