= Jupiter Dolichenus =

Roman mystery cult of the god Jupiter

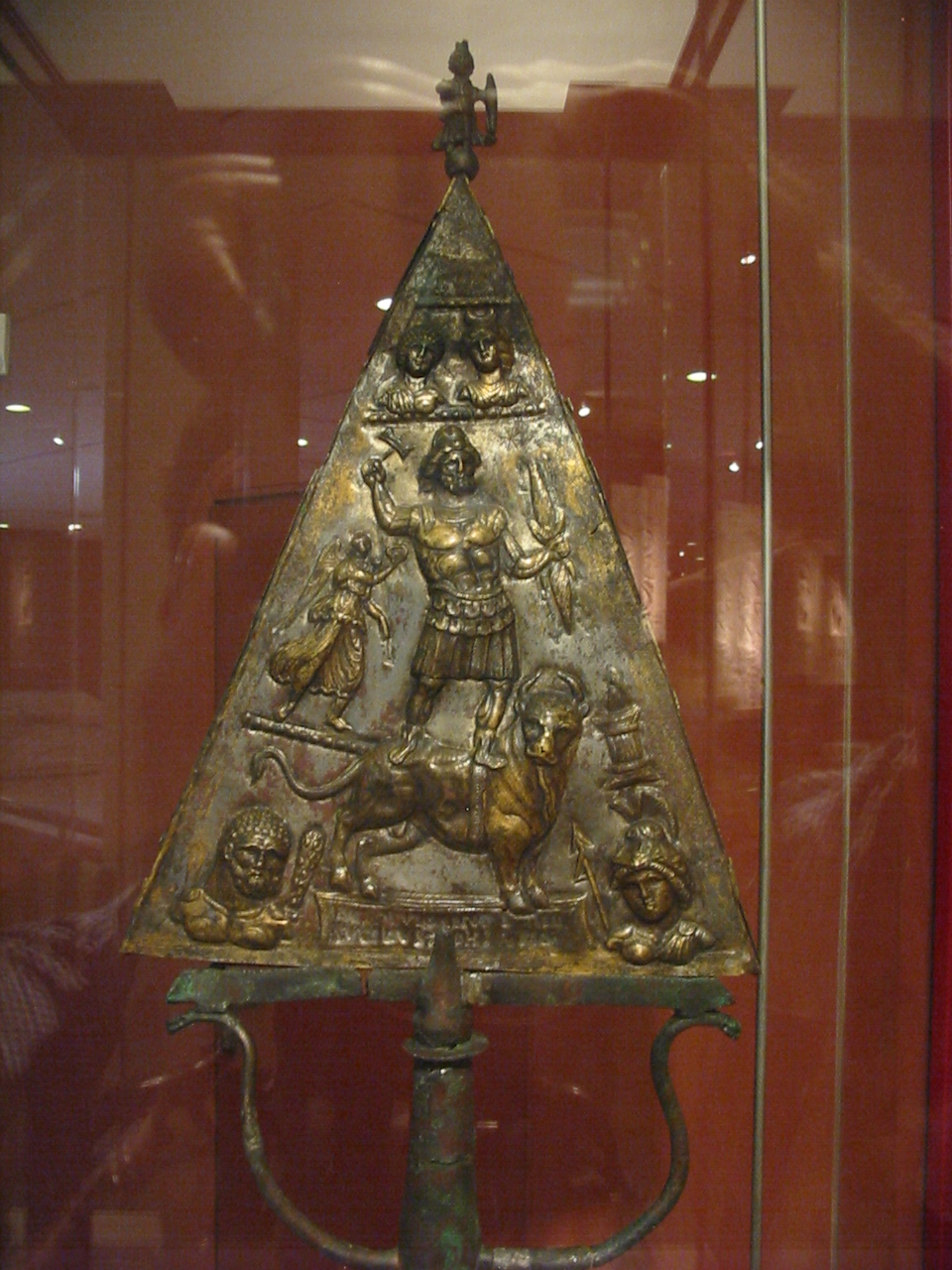
Jupiter Dolichenus bronze plaque from Lussonium (Dunakömlőd), Hungary. Hungarian National Museum, Budapest.

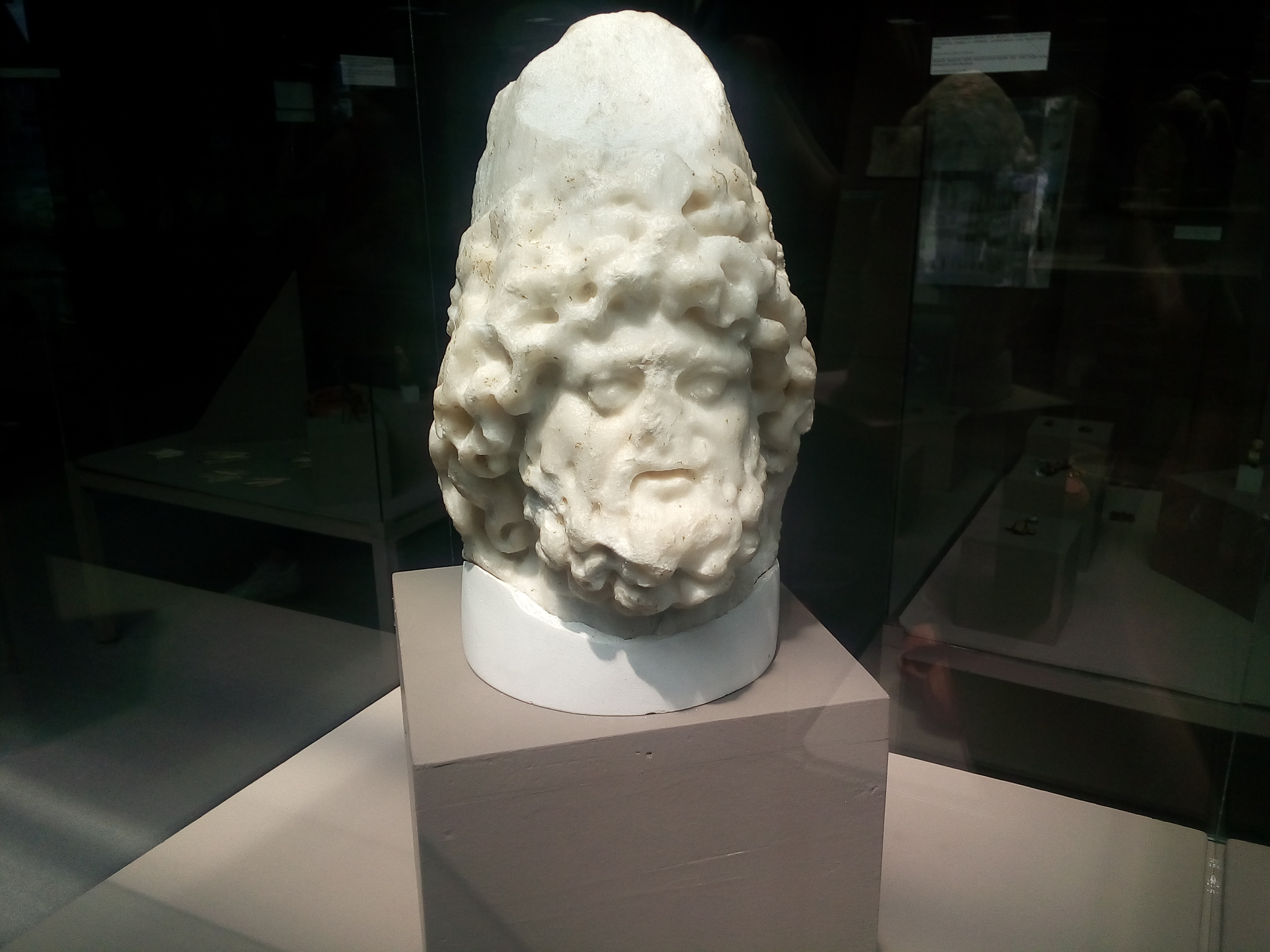
Sculpture of God Jupiter Dolichenus, Archaeological Museum in Kladovo

Jupiter Dolichenus ("Jupiter of Doliche") was a Roman god whose mystery cult was widespread in the Roman Empire from the early-2nd to mid-3rd centuries AD. Like several other figures of the mystery cults, Jupiter Dolichenus was one of the so-called 'oriental' gods; that is Roman re-inventions of ostensibly foreign figures in order to give their cults legitimacy and to distinguish them from the cults of the traditional Roman gods. assumed to have really been a Roman continuation of an oriental figure. In the case of Jupiter Dolichenus, the cult's exoticism was attributed to an interpretatio romana derivation from a semitic Hadad-Baal-Teshub cult, which had its cult center on a hill near Doliche, 30 Roman Miles west of Samosata on the Euphrates, in the Commagene in eastern Asia Minor.

Like the other mystery cults (including the other pseudo-oriental ones), the cult of Jupiter Dolichenus gained popularity in the Roman Empire as a complement of the open 'public' religion of mainstream Roman society. Unlike the Roman public cults, but like the other mysteries, the temples of the cult of Jupiter Dolichenus were nominally closed to outsiders and followers had to undergo rites of initiation before they could be accepted as devotees. As a result, very little is known about the cult's beliefs and practices from the few clues that can be obtained from the sparse iconographic, archaeological or epigraphic evidence.

The cult gained popularity in the 2nd century AD, reached a peak under the Severan dynasty in the early 3rd century AD, and died out shortly thereafter. At least nineteen temples (including two discovered in 2000) are known to have been built in Rome and the provinces which, while substantial, is far below the popularity enjoyed by the comparable pseudo-oriental cults of Mithras, Isis or Cybele.

== History ==
Until the late 20th-century, Roman exoticism was usually taken at face value, and Jupiter Dolichenus was therefore – like the other pseudo-oriental figures also – assumed to have really been a Roman continuation of an oriental figure. In the case of Jupiter Dolichenus, the exoticism was attributed to an interpretatio romana derivation from a semitic Hadad-Baal-Teshub cult, which had its cult center on a hill () near Doliche, 30 Roman Miles west of Samosata on the Euphrates, in the Commagene in eastern Asia Minor (The present-day name of the hill is Baba Tepesi, "the Hill of the Father (Teshub)". Historical Doliche is on a height now known as Keber Tepe, just west of Dülük, Gaziantep Province, Turkey). It is from the city of Doliche that the epithet 'Dolichenus' "of Doliche" was adopted. However, since the 1980s, it has become increasingly evident that the exotic gloss the Romans gave to their so-called 'oriental' gods was mostly superficial, and based primarily on Roman perceptions (hearsay and their own imagination) of what the foreign gods were like. Accordingly, in the context of Roman religion, the term 'oriental' no longer carries much weight and is now mostly only used as an archaeological docket tag. This development applies to all Roman 'oriental' gods equally.

The cult of Jupiter Dolichenus is especially difficult to assess in this respect because the archaeological finds at Dülük indicate that, at some point, Roman material was exported to Doliche, thus obscuring the distinction between Roman and native cult there. These scholastic issues notwithstanding, the Romans perceived Jupiter Dolichenus as 'Syrian', and that perception, not the reality, influenced the Roman world. Reinvented or not, the Roman cult appears to have been informed by Baal's roles as a national god and as a 'king' god (i.e. the senior-most of his pantheon), both aspects also being features of Roman Jupiter. How much doctrine (if any) the Romans borrowed remains unknown.

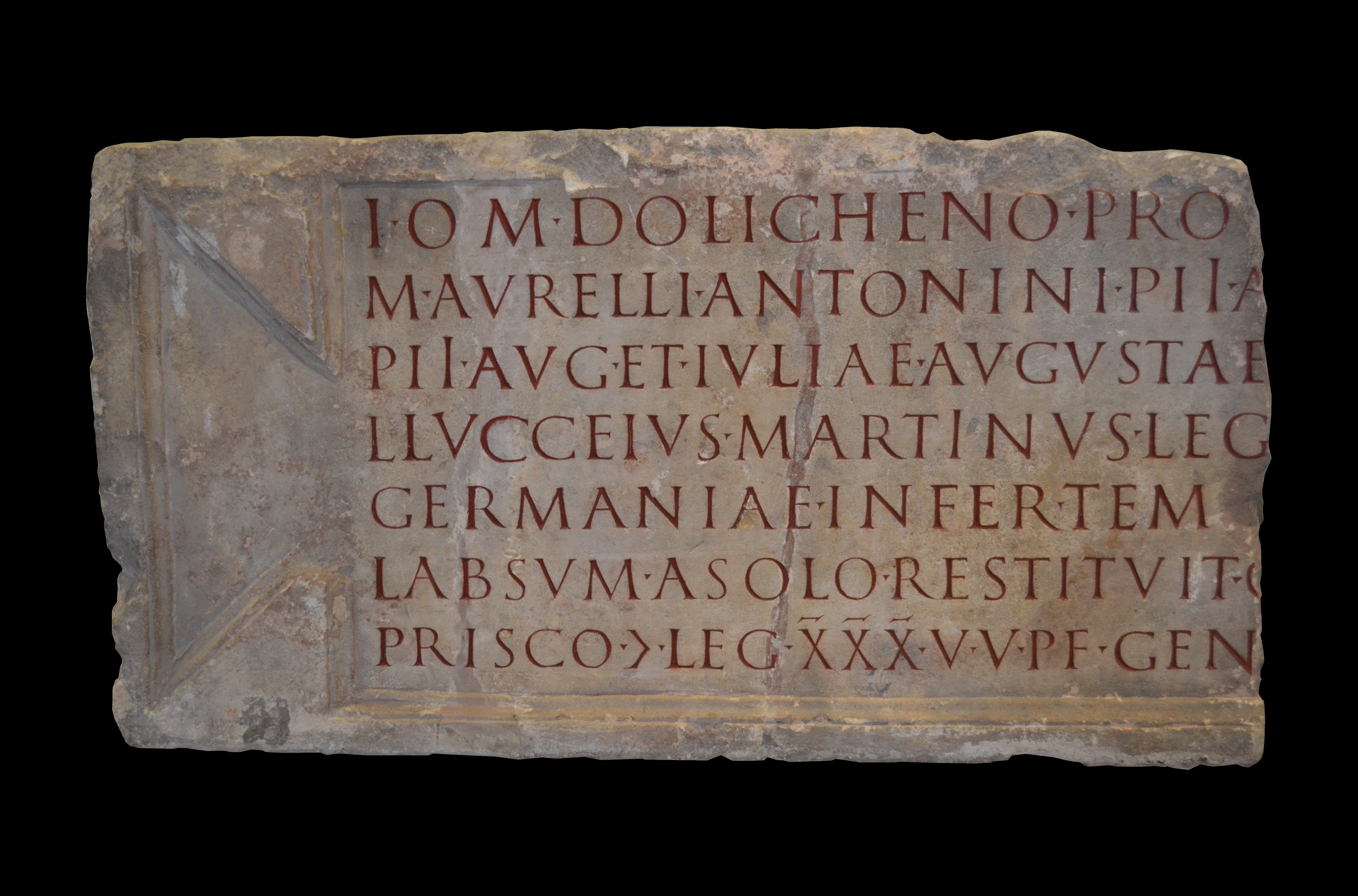
CIL XIII, 8201: Inscription of the provincial governor Lucius Lucceius Martinus (legatus Augustorum pro praetore provinciae Germaniae inferioris) commemorating the restoration of a temple dedicated to Jupiter Dolichenus. The dedication is also for the well-being of the family of the emperor M(arcus) Aurelius (Severus) Antoninus, i.e. Caracalla. From Colonia Claudia Ara Agrippinensium, dated to around 211/212.

The earliest traces of the cult of Jupiter Dolichenus appear in the early 2nd-century, perhaps as a by-product of contact between Roman and Commagenian troops during the allied Roman-Commagenian campaigns against the Kingdom of Pontus in 64 BC, but perhaps also as a product of greatly embellished (or even freely invented) travel accounts or colportage which circulated around the Mediterranean rim in the Hellenistic and early Roman periods. The earliest dateable evidence for the Roman cult is an inscription (CIL VIII, 2680) from Lambaesis in Numidia (in present-day Algeria), where the commander of Roman troops and de facto governor dedicated an altar in 125 AD. The cult is next attested in Rome, during the reign of Marcus Aurelius (r. 161–180) when a temple to Jupiter Dolichenus was built on the Caelian Hill. Not much later, the cult is attested in Germany where a centurion of Legio VIII Augusta dedicated an altar in 191 at Obernburg in Germania Superior (CIL XIII, 6646). A large number of dedications then occur under Septimius Severus (r. 193–211) and Caracalla (r. 198–217), which represents the high point of the cult. A once-held idea that the cult of Jupiter Dolichenus received imperial support, in particular from the Severan dynasts (who were of Syrian-African descent), is no longer followed. Another older notion that Jupiter Dolichenus was the tutelary divinity of the army is also obsolete.

Unlike the other pseudo-oriental mystery cults, the worship of Jupiter Dolichenus was very fixed on its 'Doliche'/'Syrian' exoticism and identity, which contributed to the cult's demise. Through an identification with the Severan dynasty (which was perceived to be 'Syrian' as Caracalla was half Syrian and spent much of his reign in the eastern provinces), following the assassination of Alexander Severus in 235 the cult perhaps became a target as part of an 'Illyrian reaction' against the fallen 'Syrian' dynasty and its supporters. The archaeological record reveals violent destruction of all known Dolichenus temples in the provinces on the Rhine and Danube during the reign of Maximinus Thrax (r. 235–238). The Thracian emperor is known to have filled his coffers from sanctuaries, and the cult of Jupiter Dolichenus was an easy target since it was not very widespread. However, the destruction of the sanctuaries in the Rhine/Danubian provinces was not the end of the cult, either in those provinces or anywhere else, and several monuments date to the next two decades.

However, in 253 or 256, the Sassanid emperor Shapur I captured and sacked Doliche. It appears that with the loss of Dolichenus' ostensible main sanctuary, the god was permanently discredited in terms of his perceived power, and evidence of the cult ceased thereafter. The cult had tied itself so firmly to the sanctity of Doliche and to the oriental nature of the god that it had never achieved the universality that it needed in order to survive the loss. The last known Dolichenus monument is from the Esquiline Hill temple and dates to the reign of Gallienus (r. 253–268). Several monuments were formerly thought to be of a later date, but those estimates are now obsolete.

== Worship ==
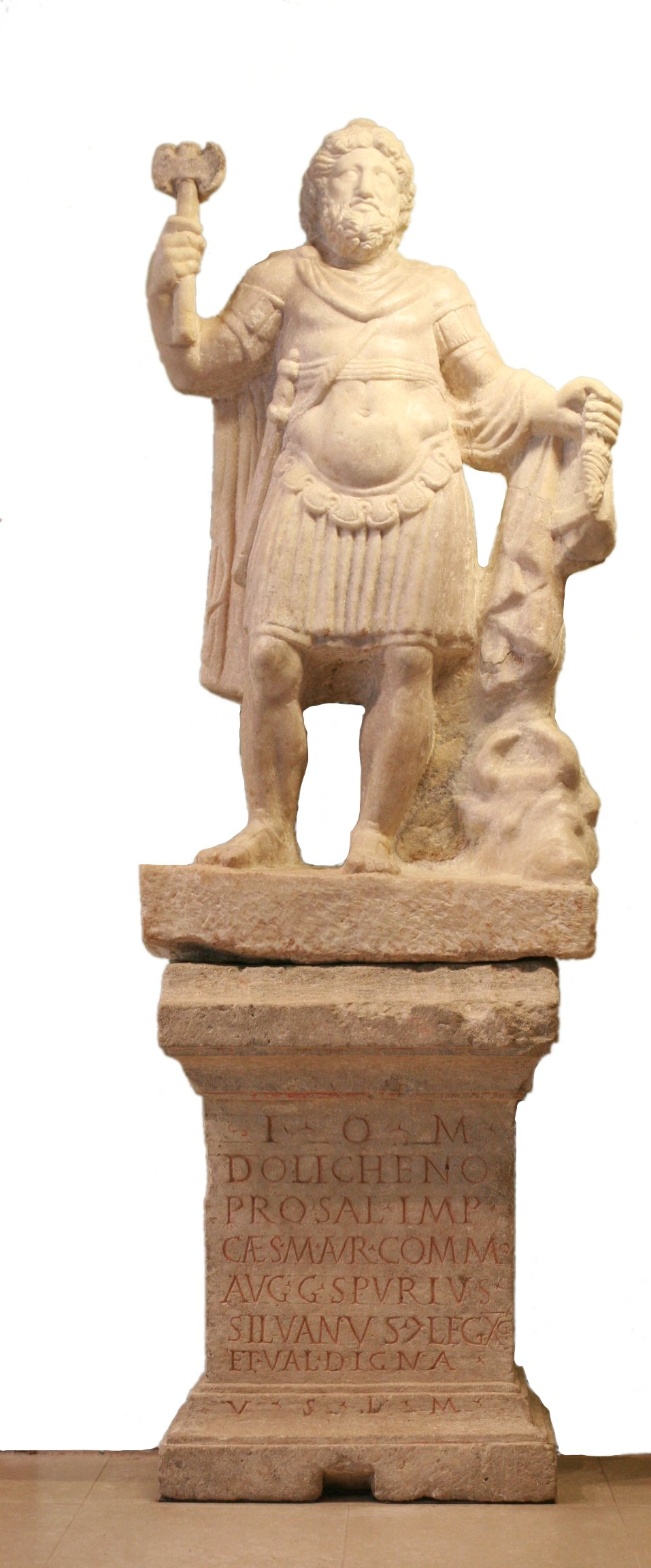
Jupiter Dolichenus as a Roman commander, but with the standard weapons of the god: a double-axe in his right hand, and a lightning bolt in his left. From Carnuntum, early 3rd-century. The inscription (CIL III, 11134) reads: I(ovi) O(ptimo) M(aximo) / Dolicheno / pro sal(ute) Imp(eratoris) / Caes(aris) M(arci) Aur(eli) Commo(di) / Aug(usti) C(aius) Spurius / Silvanus |(centurio) leg(ionis) X G(eminae) / et Val(eria) Digna / v(otum) s(olverunt) l(ibentes) m(erito) ‘To Jupiter Optimus Maximus Dolichenus, for the well-being of Emperor Caesar M. Aurelius Commodus Augustus, C. Spurius Silvanus—a centurion of the legio X Gemina—and Valeria Digna freely and deservedly fulfilled their vow’.

Jupiter Dolichenus was always addressed in full as Jupiter Optimus Maximus Dolichenus, in Latin epigraphical dative case abbreviated 'IOM Dolicheno', or 'Iovi Optimo Maximo Dolicheno' in full. 'Optimus Maximus', meaning 'Best and Greatest', was the stock epithet of Jupiter, with whom Jupiter Dolichenus was co-identified and for whom the term of respect was maintained. The adoption of Jupiter's Optimus Maximus epithet co-identified the two, but may also be seen as an attempt to attract worshippers to their own cult. Jupiter Dolichenus did however also receive some distinctive forms of address. One inscription from a temple on the Aventine hill in Rome, for example, addresses Jupiter Dolichenus as 'eternal preserver' (AE 1940, 75), while another acknowledges the god as 'Jupiter Optimus Maximus Dolichenus Eternal, preserver of the firmament, pre-eminent divinity, invincible provider' (CIL VI, 406).

The cult of Jupiter Dolichenus was a mystery religion whose customs and rituals were restricted to initiates. Very little is known about the cult as it did not last long enough to appear in polemical Christian literature that provided so many useful clues on other mystery cults such as that of Mithras. The archaeological and epigraphic material is very sparse. A reference to a sacerdotus (priest) in CIL VI, 31187/CIL VI, 31188 shows that there was an internal structure, though one that did not seem to have any great complexity. In a temple to Jupiter Optimus Maximus at Porolissum, a number of priests are mentioned (Sacerdotes Dei Iovi): Marcus Aurelius Vitalus, a duumvir; Antonius Mavius, a decurion; Acius Flavus; Caius Marcius Vegesius; and one Attonaris Bassus. An inscription (AE 1940, 75) from the Aventine temple (see below) gives a list of the members of one community. The group consists of 32 names, 7 of which are identified as being a patronus (patron). The text of the inscription refers to patroni and candidati (candidates), so it may be that the other names were men who held status of candidatus. Whether the men were candidates for initiation or candidates for a higher rank is unclear. The patrons may have been sponsoring new candidates to join the community, but the text of the inscriptions refers to both as fratri (brothers), which suggests that the candidates are all already initiates. One priest dedicates the inscription and styles himself as 'father of the candidates'. In another inscription (CIL VI, 406) the roles of 'recorder', 'leaders of this place' and 'litter-bearers of the god' are identified. The members of the community are introduced by the phrase 'Jupiter Optimus Maximus Dolichenus chose the following to serve him'.

Of the 260 devotees named in votive inscriptions, 97 are for soldiers, and it thus seems that the cult had a particular attraction for members of the military. In CIL XIV, 110 from Ostia Antica, an inscription from around 186 AD, an entire naval unit – a detachment of the fleet at Misenum – is named as dedicator. Several votive tablets include depictions of military standards and war trophies. Dedications to Jupiter Dolichenus by the commanders of provincial armies indicate there was a certain measure of support for the cult in high ranking army circles. Also the inscription CIL XIII, 8201 suggests that the cult could attract important patrons. That inscription of the provincial governor Lucius Lucceius Martinus (legatus Augustorum pro praetore provinciae Germaniae inferioris) commemorates the restoration of a temple dedicated to Jupiter Dolichenus in 211/212. However, it's not clear how involved such a dignitary might have been in the cult, or whether the governor was even an initiate. The dedication could merely represent the fulfillment of political duties. The inscription does however indicate a measure of support from influential persons.

Jupiter Dolichenus is frequently depicted in the company of Jupiter's consort, Juno. Within the cult of Jupiter Dolichenus, Juno takes the name Juno Dolichena. In iconography she always appears on the right of her partner. The cult of Jupiter Dolichenus also gave prominence to Apollo and Diana, who often appear on votive tablets as a pair of busts side by side. The reason for this placement is unknown. Equally important seem to have been Sol, god of the sun, and Luna, goddess of the moon. These two provide a clear cosmic element. Rather than being distinct members of the pantheon it may be that Apollo and Sol are serving the same function as sun gods, as are Diana and Luna with the moon. Castor and Pollux also frequently appear and their role is less clear. Most likely they are seen as the sons of Jupiter. Isis and Serapis also appear with some frequency, perhaps as 'guests' or as allusions to the royal pair of Doliche.

== Art and iconography ==
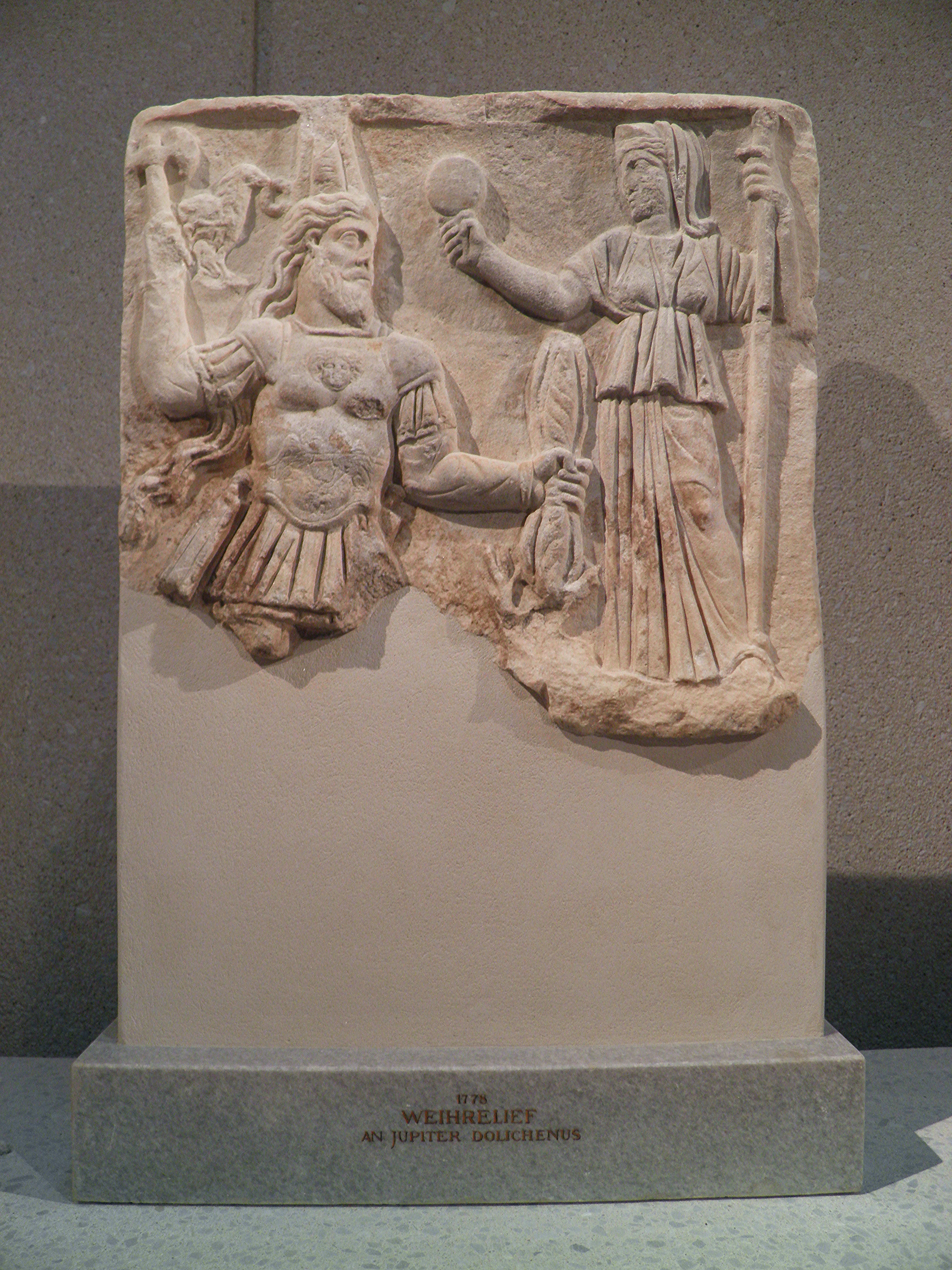
Votive relief to Jupiter Dolichenus (left, with double-axe and lightning bolt) and Juno Dolichena (right, with mirror and scepter). From Rome, 3rd century.

Few of the characteristic attributes of Jupiter appear in the representation of Jupiter Dolichenus, apart from the thunderbolt, a beard, and at times the eagle. In all other respects the god is a new creation which blends "oriental" with Hellenistic conventions. The god always appears dressed in a military fashion, armed and dressed in a cuirass. This does not necessarily mean that his cult was especially militaristic; rather, the attributes signify power and royalty. The cuirass in particular is a Hellenistic artistic convention to portray divinity. The weapon that the god carries is usually a double-headed axe (a labris), a weapon often associated with the kings of Thrace and Asia Minor and not a common soldier's weapon. In accord with Roman conventions, Jupiter Dolichenus is also depicted with Phrygian cap and trousers, thus presenting the god as "oriental".

The unique feature of representations of Jupiter Dolichenus is that he is almost always shown standing on the back of a bull. There has been much speculation over the fact that Jupiter Dolichenus is always depicted as standing on the back of the animal. It must have had significance to the cult myth (a mystery cult's myth is that cult's mystery) that would have been transmitted to devotees, but what that myth might have been is unknown. The bull had a long association with concepts of strength, virility and fertility, and was identified in Hellenistic Asia Minor with Nike/Victoria. Bulls also appear frequently in the furnishings of the cult's temples. At the temple to Jupiter Dolichenus at the Zugmantel, a Roman cohort post on the Upper Limes Germanicus near present-day Taunusstein, Germany, the altar table was supported by legs carved in the shape of two bulls. In contrast Juno Dolichena rides a deer, an animal with suitably royal associations. At Croy Hill she seems to have stood on a cow which is associated with motherhood.

An altar from Obernburg (CIL XIII, 6646), now in the Stiftsmuseum Aschaffenburg) perhaps relates the cult myth. On the left side are carved a thunderbolt, a tree and a shield (scutum). The thunderbolt is a standard attribute of Jupiter; however, the tree and the shield are not.

== Temples ==
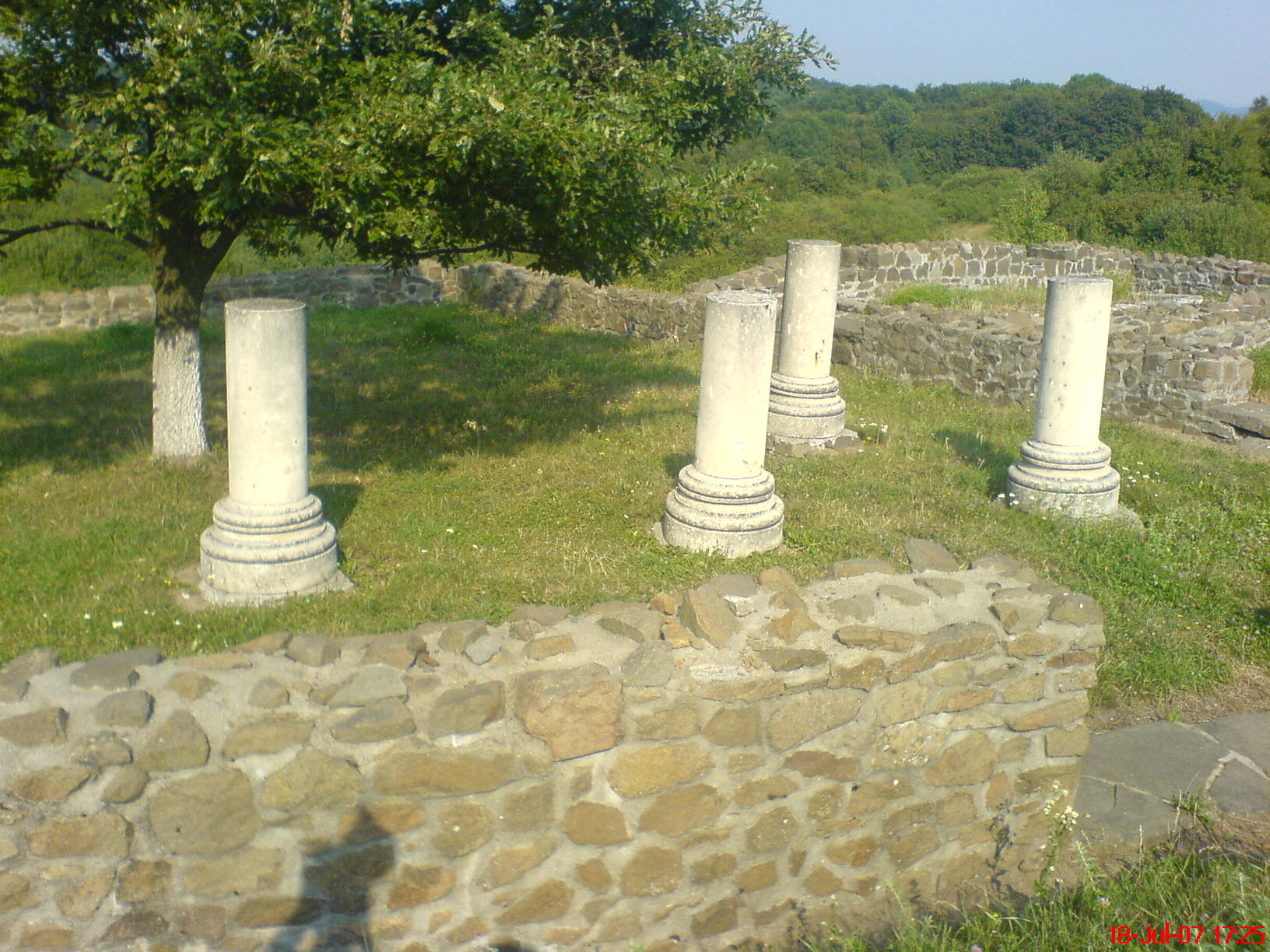
The temple of Jupiter Optimus Maximus Dolichenus at Porolissum, Dacia.

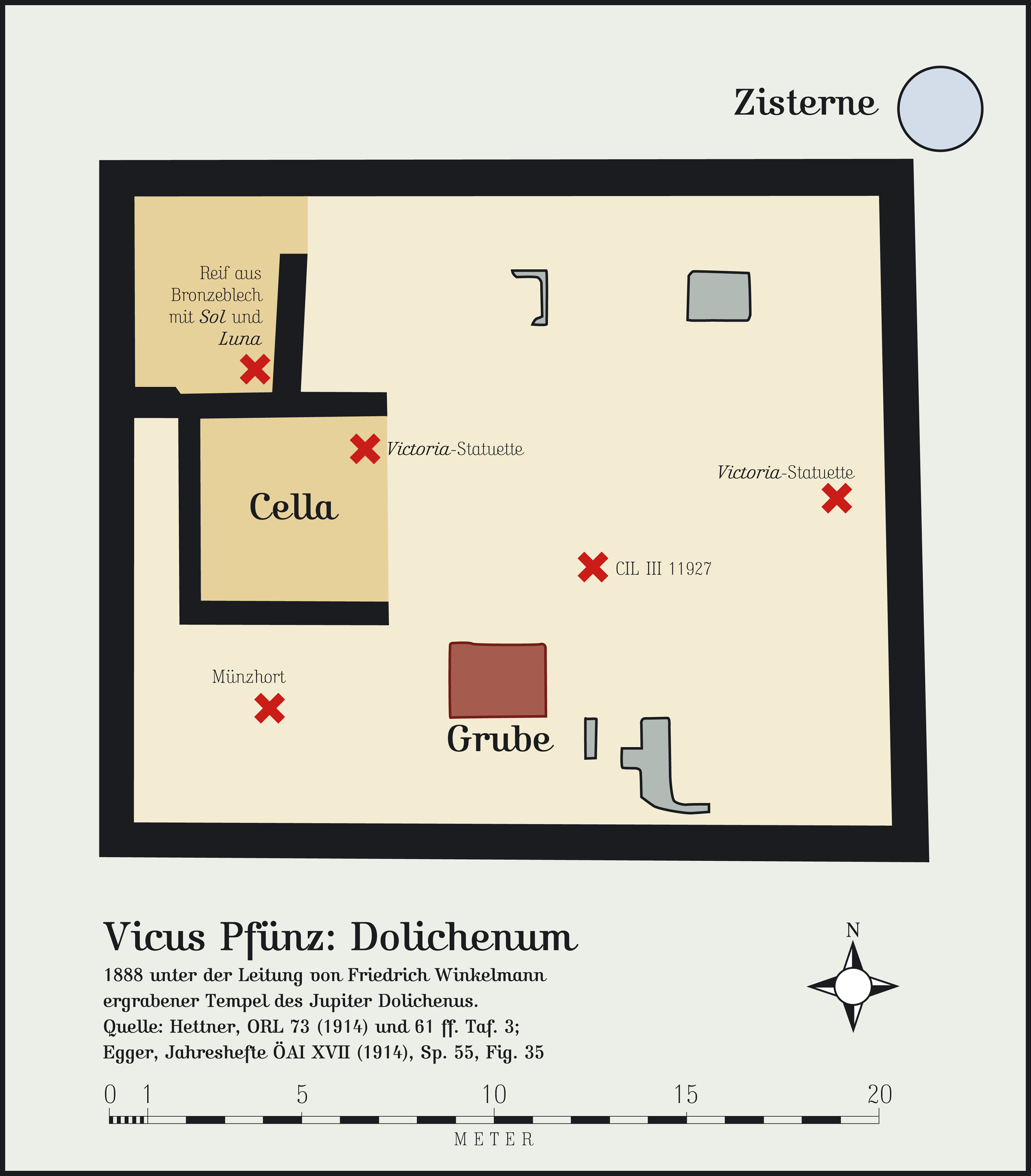
The temple of Jupiter Optimus Maximus Dolichenus at Vetoniana, Rhaetia.

A temple to Jupiter Dolichenus is known as a dolichenum, a modern term invented by archaeologists. No specific term seems to have existed as the devotees only use the word templum when referring to their shrines (e.g. CIL VIII 2680 = 18221). The function of the temples is far from clear and although 19 (including two since 2000) have been identified or excavated (see below), few details can be securely agreed on. The temples are not in the classical style of a rectangular colonnaded shrine standing on a raised podium with an altar outside in front. However, like most Roman temples, they have a narthex as well as a cella with a central nave that ended at a high altar. There are also some similarities to the so-called mithraea, the temples of the cult to Mithras, as they are windowless and rectangular in plan. The podium benches that are typical of a mithraeum, on which initiates could recline when they took part in their ritual meals, do not seem to have existed in dolichenae. Steinby interprets the podium of the Aventine temple as a "long platform, probably for dedications."

Archaeological remains of temples or shrines of Jupiter Dolichenus have been found at:

- Aventine Hill, Roma (under present-day Via di S. Domenico).
- Esquiline Hill, Roma (known of only from inscriptions found in the vicinity of the Piazza Vittorio Emanuele II).
- Lambaesis, Numidia (near present-day Batna, Algeria).
- Dura Europus, Syria (near present-day Salhiyé, Syria).
- Chersonesus, Regnum Bospori (near present-day Balaklava/Sevastopol, Ukraine).
- Apulum, Dacia (in present-day Alba-Iulia, Romania).
- Porolissum, Dacia (near present-day Zalău, Romania).
- Vetus Salina, Pannonia (near present-day Adony, Hungary).
- Brigetio, Pannonia (in present-day Komárom, Hungary).
- Gerulata, Pannonia (in present-day Bratislava-Rusovce, Slovakia).
- Carnuntum, Noricum (near present-day Petronell/Deutsch-Altenburg, Austria).
- Beliandrum, Noricum (present-day Feldkirchen, Austria).
- Virunum, Noricum (near present-day Maria Saal, Kärnten, Austria).
- Vetoniana, Raetia (near present-day Eichstätt, Germany).
- Colonia Claudia Ara Agrippinensium, Germania Inferior (in present-day Cologne, Germany).
- Nida, Germania Superior (in present-day Frankfurt-Heddernheim, Germany).
- 'Kastell Stockstadt', Germania Superior (in present-day Stockstadt am Main, Germany).
- 'Kastell Zugmantel', Germania Superior (in present-day Taunusstein-Orlen, Germany).
- Vindolanda, Britannia (near present-day Hexham, Northumberland, UK).
- Atuatuca Tungrorum, Germania Inferior (present-day Tongeren, Belgium), an inscription was found beneath the Basilica of Our Lady, Tongeren.

With the exception of the sanctuary(ies) in Rome, all sites are Roman frontier settlements.

== Bibliography ==
- Beard, Mary; North, John; Price, Simon (1998). The Religions of Rome. Vol. I. Cambridge University Press.
- Bunnens, Guy (2004). "The storm-god in northern Syria and southern Anatolia from Hadad of Aleppo to Iupiter Dolichenus". In Hutter, Manfred; Hutter-Braunsar, Sylvia (eds.). Offizielle Religion, lokale Kulte und individuelle Religiosität. Alter Orient und Altes Testament. Vol. 318. Münster: Ugarit. pp. 57–82.
- Handy, Markus (2021). "Fortbestand oder Niedergang? Lokalkult oder Reichsreligion? Zum Kult des Iuppiter Dolichenus im 3. Jh. n. Chr." In: Auer, Martin; Hinker, Christoph (eds). Roman Settlements and the "Crisis" of the 3rd Century AD. Wiesbaden: Harrassowitz, ISBN 978-3-447-11593-3, pp. 71–79.
- Hörig, Monika; Schwertheim, Elmar (1987). Corpus cultus Iovis Dolicheni. Études préliminaires aux religions orientales dans l’empire romain. Vol. 106. Leiden, NL: Brill.
- Jacobi, H. (1924). "Das Heiligtum des Juppiter Dolichenus auf dem Zugmantel". Saalburg Jahrbuch. VI: 168–183.
- Najdenova, Varbinka (1989). "The cult of Jupiter Dolichenus in lower Moesia and Thrace". Aufstieg und Niedergang der römischen Welt. II (16.2): 1542–1555.
- Merlat, Pierre (1947). "Jupiter Dolichenus, Serapis et Isis". Revue Archéologique. 27: 10–31.
- Merlat, Pierre (1951). Répertoire des inscriptions et monuments figurés du culte de Jupiter Dolichenus. Paris, FR: Guenther.
- Pahl, Joachim (2010). Der Kult des Jupiter Dolichenus. Ausbreitung, Selbstverständnis, Niedergang. Dissertation, University of Münster.
- Speidel, Michael (1978). The Religion of Jupiter Dolichenus in the Roman Army. Études préliminaires aux religions orientales dans l’Empire romain. Vol. 63. Leiden, NL: Brill.
- Steinby, Eva Margareta, ed. (1993). Lexicon Topographicum Urbis Romae. Rome, IT: Edizioni Quasar.
- Tamba, Dumitru Gheorghe (12 May 2010). "Templul lui Iupiter Optimus Maximus de la Porolissum (I)". Caiete Silvane (in Romanian). Vol. 65. Romania. article 1039. Archived from the original on 2011-09-11.
- Tóth, István (1973). "The destruction of the sanctuaries of Iuppiter Dolichenus at the Rhine and in the Danube region". Acta Archaeologica Academiae Scientiarum Hungaricae. 25: 109–116.
- Turcan, Robert (1996). The Cults of the Roman Empire. Malden: Blackwell. pp. 159–169.

=== Museum collections ===
- Aiud Museum. Aiud, Romania. Inscription from near Apulum recording the restoration of a temple by a sacerdos.
- Archäologisches Museum Frankfurt. Frankfurt am Main, Germany. Replicas of all six silver plaques from Heddernheim.
- British Museum. London, England. Three silver plaques from Heddernheim.
- Epigraphic Museum at the Baths of Diocletian. Rome, Italy. The altars and sculptures dedicated by the emperor's bodyguard.
- Museum Carnuntum. Bad Deutsch-Altenburg, Austria. The fine sculptures from the Carnuntum shrine.
- Museum Wiesbaden. Wiesbaden, Germany. The finds from Zugmantel and some of the original Frankfurt-Heddernheim silver plaques.
- Römisch-Germanisches Museum. Cologne, Germany. Inscription recording the dedication of a temple by the provincial governor.
- Stiftsmuseum Aschaffenburg. Aschaffenburg, Germany. The finds from the Stockstadt temple and the altar from Obernburg.
- Teseum. Tongeren, Belgium. An inscription stands within the subterranean archaeological site.

37°07′40″N 37°20′43″E
