= Turmasgade =

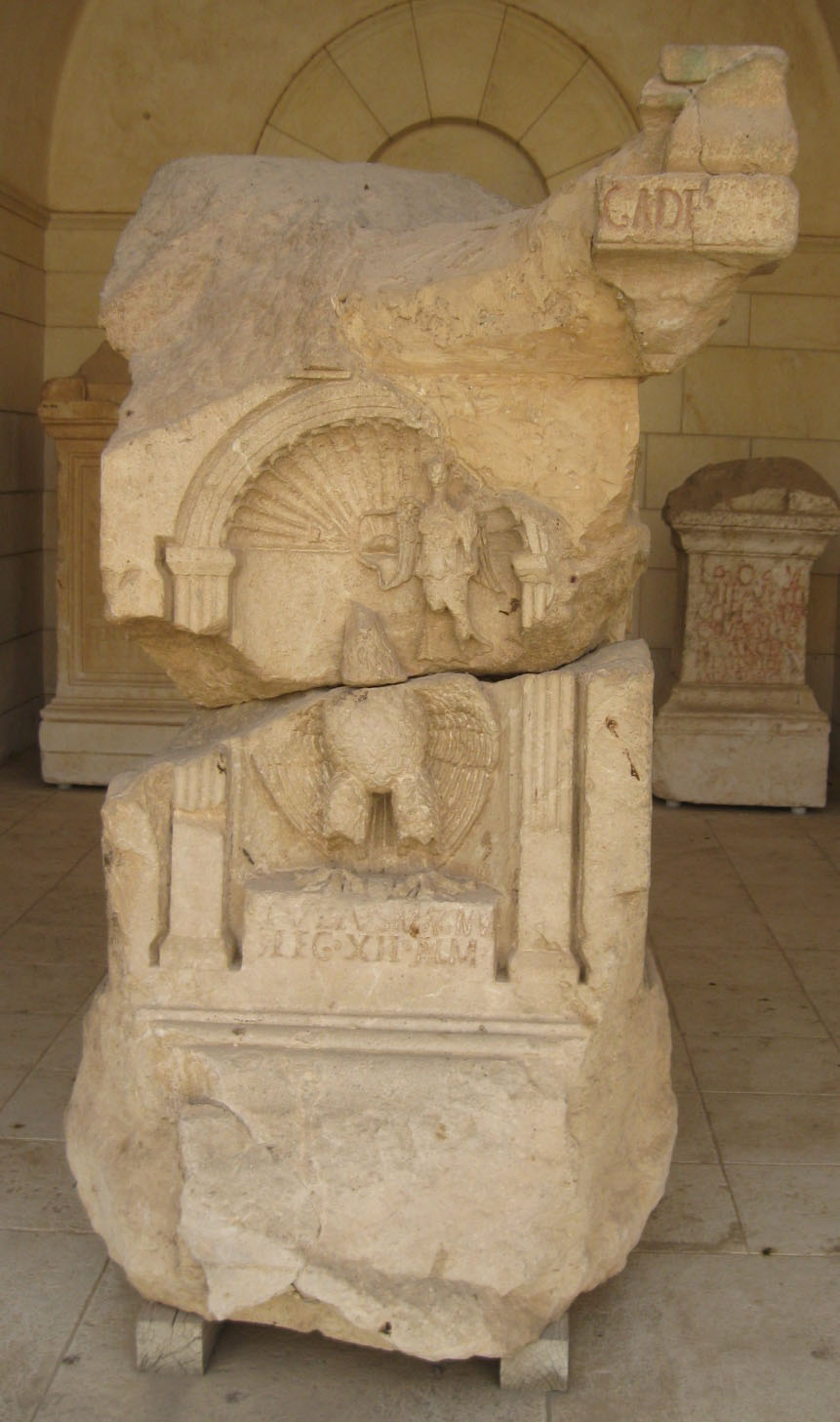
Altar with consecration at Turmasgade, from Caesarea Maritima

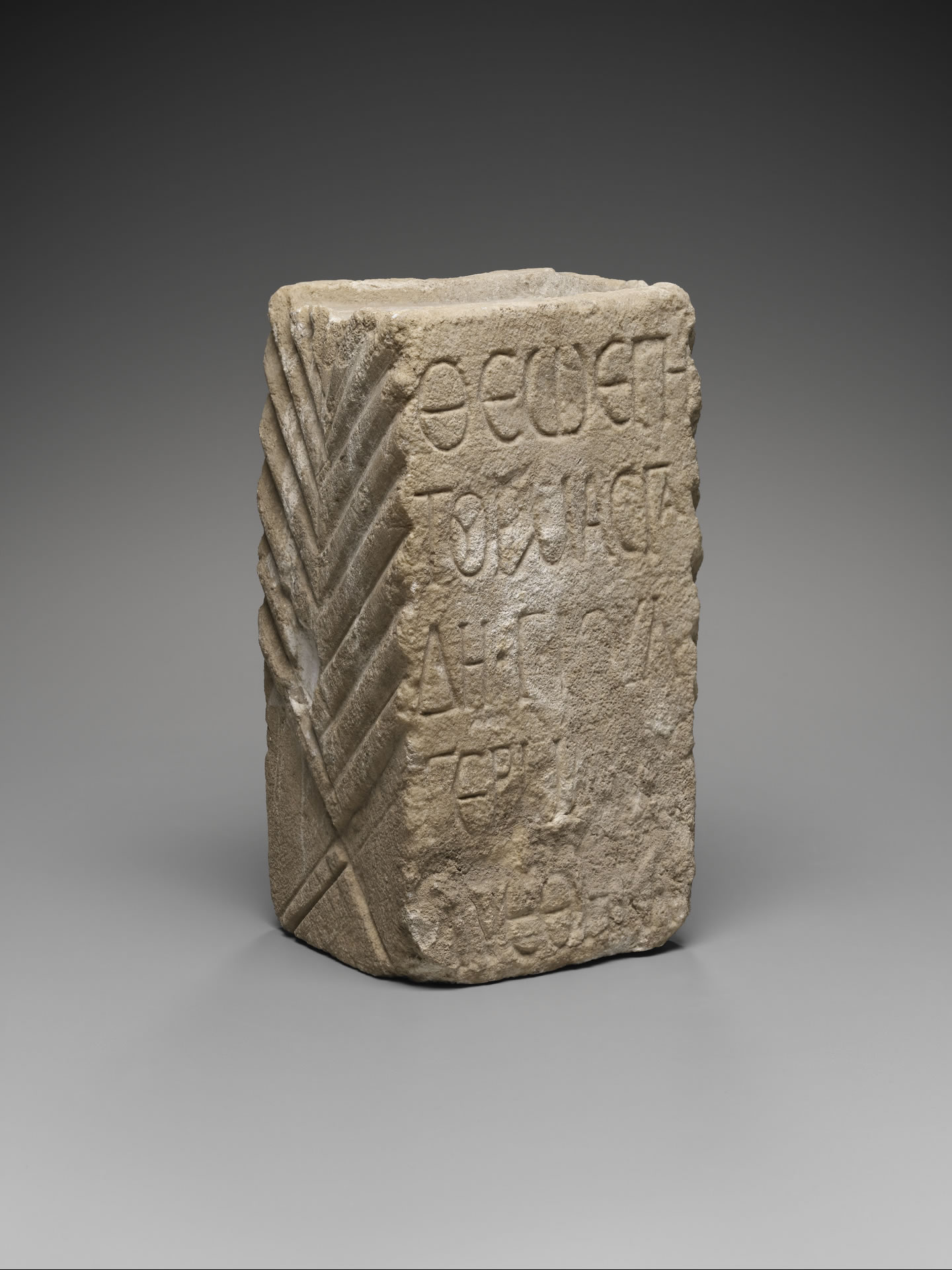
Altar of Turmasgade from Dolicheneum in Dura Europos

Turmasgade is a little known god, known from about 10 inscriptions from the Roman Empire. The name 'Turmasgade' is Aramaic and means "mountain of worship" or "mountain of sanctuary". Tur means "mountain"; msgd - "worship" or "sanctuary". This may indicate that Turmasgade was a holy mountain, but also a deity. In some inscriptions he is identified with Zeus, but in other there is no evidence of such identification. It has been suggested that the god from the originates from the Kingdom of Commagene. So far there are only nine certain mentions of the god, most of which come from the east of the Roman Empire; one inscription comes from Trier, another from Rome. A sanctuary of God has been excavated in Dura Europos, Dolicheneum.
