= Doliche (Commagene) =

Ancient city in modern Turkey

Dülük
- Δολίχη (Ancient Greek); Տլուք (Armenian)
- Dolikhe, Doliche, Tulupa
- Location within Turkey
- Interactive map of Dülük
- 37°09′N 37°22′E
- Type: Human settlement
- Cultures: Hittites, Medes, Assyrians, Persians
- Location: Dülük, Şehitkamil, Gaziantep, Turkey
- Region: Commagene

Dülük, also known as Dolikhe or Doliche (Ancient Greek: Δολίχη; Armenian: Տլուք, romanized: Tlukʿ), or Tulupa, is an ancient city located in the Şehitkamil district of Gaziantep, in the neighborhood that bears the same name. Dülük is considered the oldest continuously inhabited settlement in Turkey. Artifacts from the Copper Age have been discovered here, along with evidence of some of the earliest known mathematical calculations.

Throughout history, the city changed hands numerous times, being ruled in succession by the Hittites, Medes, Assyrians, Persians, and Alexander the Great. The foundation of a nearby city, Antiochia ad Taurum (present-day Gaziantep), gradually diminished Dülük’s importance, leading to its current form.

== History ==
=== Hittite period ===
During the Hittite period, it was a stop on the road connecting the Mediterranean to Mesopotamia. It was also a religious center. The sanctuary of the Hittite god Teshub was just to the north of the village.

=== Hellenistic period ===
In the literary sources, the existence of the Hellenistic colony is not attested before the 2nd century CE. It is speculated that part of the original colonial population of Doliche came from the homonymous Thessalian city. The discovery of Rhodean amphorae handles suggest communications with the Aegean Sea during the 3rd and 2nd centuries BCE. The Seleucids adopted the worship of the local storm-god as Zeus Dolichenus, identified with Baal. At this time it was a small city on the road from Germanicia to Zeugma.

Doliche was at one time considered to belong to the ancient region of Cyrrhestica. It was ruled by the Kingdom of Commagene "for about 35 years"; after being governed by Antiochus Theos, it might have been incorporated into the Roman province of Syria as early as 31 BCE.

=== Roman period ===
Commagene was definitively annexed to the Roman Empire in 72 CE. It was incorporated into the Roman province of Syria, Under Roman rule, Doliche remained part of the region of Commagene, a region of the Roman province of Syria, and as that was portioned of the provinces Coele-Syria and ultimately of Syria Euphratensis.

The worship of Jupiter Dolichenus became widespread from the mid-second to the mid-third century CE, particularly though not exclusively in the Roman army. A number of religious monuments of Jupiter Dolichenus refer to him as the "god of the Commagenians".

Doliche struck its own coins from the reign of Marcus Aurelius to Caracalla. Archaeological finds in Doliche include an underground Mithraic temple, rock graves and stone quarries from which giant rock blocks are produced.

The Marcianus (Ancient Greek: Μαρκιανὸς), who was Apollonius of Athens follower, was from Doliche.

In 2014, a team of German archaeologists from the University of Münster announced the excavation of a relief depicting an Iron Age deity previously unknown to them on a stele among the remains of Mar Solomon, a medieval monastery uncovered during 2010 excavations in Doliche. The monastery had been known only through writings indicating that it had been used through the era of the crusades. The University of Münster's Asia Minor Research Centre has been conducting excavation work at the main sanctuary of Jupiter Dolichenus under the direction of Engelbert Winter and Michael Blömer and is supported by the German Research Foundation. The international group consists of archaeologists, historians, architects, conservators, archaeozoologists, geoinformation scientists, and excavation workers. Winter's field work at the sanctuary dates back to 2001.

=== Medieval history ===
The town, of strategic importance due to its location at the intersection of roads linking the major cities of the region, was conquered by Iyad ibn Ghanm during the first decades of the Muslim conquests. It hence became a frontier outpost of the nascent Islamic Caliphate against the Byzantine Empire, forming part of the fortified frontier zone (al-'Awasim) after the reign of Harun al-Rashid.

In the middle of the 10th century, it played a role in the conflict between resurgent Byzantium and the Hamdanid emirate of Sayf al-Dawla, and was retaken by the Byzantines in 962. The town again became a battleground during the Crusades until it was definitely captured by atabeg Nur al-Din of Aleppo in 1155; by that time, it had declined to obscurity, its fortress in ruins and the once prosperous town reduced to a small village.

During the Crusades, the town was called Tulupa, and part of the Crusader County of Edessa.

== Ecclesiastical history ==
Doliche was an episcopal see, suffragan of the Metropolitan of Hierapolis Bambyce (capital of Euphratensis, in the civil diocese of Oriens), in the sway of the patriarchate of Antioch.

The names of eight of its Byzantine bishops are known:

- Archelaus, present at the First Council of Nicaea (325), and at the Synod of Antioch (341)
- Olympius attended the schismatical synod of Philippopolis held in 347 by Arian bishops opposing the decisions of the canonical Council of Serdica (344)
- Cyrion at the Council of Seleucia (359)
- Maris, during whose consecration circa 330 an Arian woman fatally stabbed Eusebius of Samosata, a bitter adversary of that heresy; he attended the First Council of Constantinople (381)
- Abibus, a Nestorian, too old in 431 to attend the Council of Ephesus, which deposed him as heretic in 434
- Athanasius, his successor elected by the council
- Timothy, a correspondent of Theodoret, present at the Robber Council of Ephesus, at a Synod of Antioch in 450 on the orthodoxy of Athanasius of Perra and at the Council of Chalcedon (451); in 457 he signed the decreto of Patriarch Gennadius I of Constantinople against simony
- Philoxenus, a nephew of the celebrated Philoxenus of Hierapolis, deposed as a Severian Encratite in 518 for Monophysitism, reinstated in 533 after recanting that heresy in Constantinople

The see figures in the first Notitiae Episcopatuum, about 840. There is a dubious claim that Doliche later took the place of Hierapolis as metropolis.

Although the Arab conquest wiped the Byzantine institutions, Christianity persisted. Fourteen Jacobite Bishops are known from the 8th to 9th century.

=== Titular see ===
The diocese was nominally restored in the eighteenth century by the Roman Catholic Church as Latin titular bishopric of Doliche (Latin = Curiate Italian) / Dolichen(us) (Latin).

It has had only Episcopal rank bishops, and as of 2022, it is vacant.
