= Dülük =

- Neighbourhood
- Location in Turkey
- Coordinates: 37°09′N 37°22′E
- Country: Turkey
- Province: Gaziantep
- District: Şehitkamil
- Elevation: 950 m (3,120 ft)
- Population (2022): 2,826
- Time zone: UTC+3 (TRT)
- Postal code: 27630
- Area code: 0342

Dülük (Armenian: Տլուք, romanized: Tlukʿ) is a neighbourhood in the municipality and district of Şehitkamil, Gaziantep Province, Turkey. Its population is 2,826 (2022). It is about 10 kilometres (6.2 mi) from Gaziantep city center. Its ancient name was Doliche (Greek: Δολίχη).

Administratively, Dülük was formerly classified as a village, but after a legal change in 2012, it was reclassified as a neighborhood.

== History ==
Finds in Tell Dülük include stone tools from 30 to 40 thousand years ago. These tools are from a Neolithic culture, unofficially dubbed the "Dulicien culture" by researchers.

== Sources and external links ==
- GCatholic - (former &) titular Latin see

Bibliography - ecclesiastical history

- Pius Bonifacius Gams, Series episcoporum Ecclesiae Catholicae, Leipzig 1931, p. 436
- Michel Lequien, Oriens christianus in quatuor Patriarchatus digestus, Paris 1740, vol. II, coll. 937-940
- Konrad Eubel, Hierarchia Catholica Medii Aevi, vol. 3, p. 187; vol. 6, p. 198
- Franz Cumont, Etudes syriennes, Paris 1917, pp. 173 seq.
- Raymond Janin, lemma 'Doliché', in Dictionnaire d'Histoire et de Géographie ecclésiastiques, vol. XIV, Paris 1960, coll. 578-580
