= Khirbat an-Nawafla =

Archaeological site in southern Jordan

Khirbat an-Nawāfla
- خربة النوافلة (Arabic)
- Khirbat Nawafleh
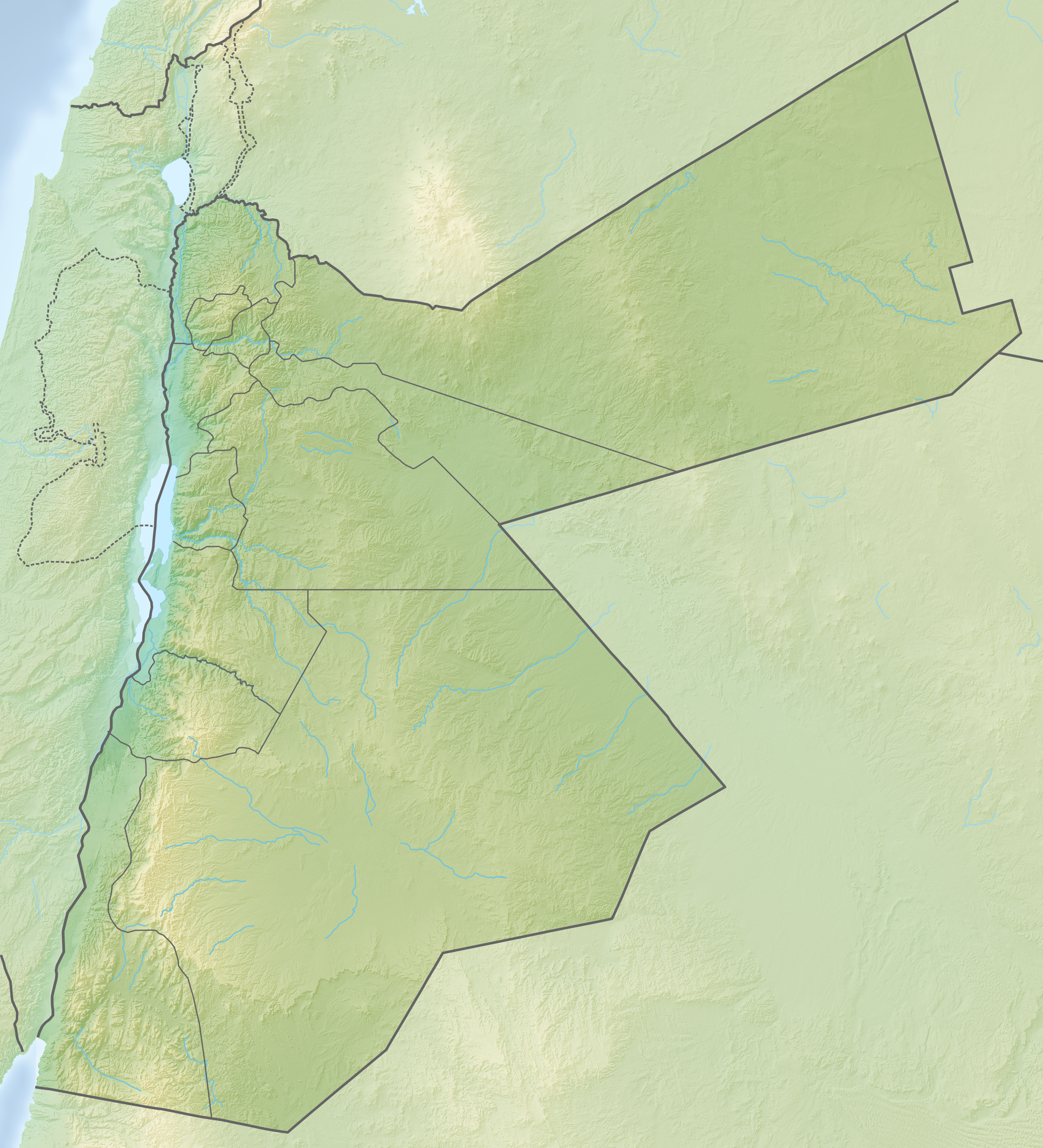
- Location within Jordan
- 30°19′26″N 35°29′10″E
- Type: Archaeological site, resort hotel
- Periods: Iron Age, Hellenistic (Nabatean) period, Roman period, Byzantine period, Early Islamic period, Ayyubid and Mamluk periods, Ottoman period
- Cultures: Edomite, Nabataean, Byzantine, Islamic
- Location: Wadi Musa, Ma'an Governorate, Jordan

History
- Founded: 1st century BCE (Nabataean settlement)
- Abandoned: 1975 (traditional village)

Site notes
- Elevation: 1,200–1,225 m (3,937–4,019 ft) above sea level
- Area: 50,000 m^{2} (12 acres)
- Excavation dates: 1997–2000
- Archaeologists: Khairieh 'Amr; Ahmed al-Momani; Naif Al-Nawafleh; Sami Al-Nawafleh

Khirbat an-Nawāfla is an archaeological site in southern Jordan, located in the northwestern part of Wadi Musa. The earliest evidence of activity consists of limited Bronze Age finds, Iron Age structural remains, and a small Hellenistic pit. The site's main occupation began in the Nabataean period (1st century BCE), when it developed into an agricultural settlement, and continued with only limited interruptions through the Late Roman, Byzantine, Umayyad, Abbasid, Fatimid, Ayyubid/Mamluk, and Ottoman periods. A modern village, established on the site in the late 19th century and abandoned in 1975, has since been adapted for use as a resort hotel.

Among the site's most significant Nabataean-era remains are a hydraulic system centered on a large cistern, the foundations of a bridge over Wadi Khalil, and an early 1st-century CE olive press considered by the excavators the earliest known Nabataean example. Late antique remains feature evidence of Christian activity including carved crosses and a monumental building tentatively interpreted as a church.

Early Islamic occupation was substantial and included domestic structures and a Kufic inscription dated to AH 170 (787 CE), the only inscription known from the early Abbasid period in southern Bilad al-Sham (early Islamic Greater Syria). The site reached its greatest extent during the Ayyubid and Mamluk periods, with notable remains including a large olive press and a cemetery containing mainly child burials. The excavators tentatively identified Khirbat an-Nawāfla with al-'Udmal, a place mentioned by al-Nuwayrī in connection with Sultan Baybars's 1276 journey. Excavations were conducted by the Department of Antiquities of Jordan between 1997 and 2000 as a salvage project ahead of tourist development.

== Geography ==
Khirbat an-Nawāfla is located in the northwestern part of the modern town of Wadi Musa, and covers approximately 5 hectares (12 acres). The Iron Age settlement of Tawilān lies to the north, while the Neolithic site of al-Basiṭ is located to the west.

== History and archaeology ==
The site's occupation, beginning in earnest in the Nabataean period, continued with only minor interruptions into the present.

=== Bronze and Iron Ages ===
The earliest structural remains identified at the site date to the Iron Age II (Edomite period), when pits and terrace or division walls were constructed in the northeastern part of the site, possibly in connection with the nearby settlement of Tawilān. Earlier activity is represented by isolated Early and Middle Bronze Age finds, including a flint blade and pottery fragments, although no structures from these periods were identified. Limited Hellenistic remains (pit and surface) were also found in the same area, while some walls in the southwestern part of the site may also belong to the Iron Age, although their date remains uncertain.

=== Nabatean period ===
The Nabataean settlement, established in the 1st century BCE, expanded to cover much of the area later occupied by the modern village. Its inhabitants developed a hydraulic system consisting of channels, tanks, and a large cistern near the village entrance. The cistern, measuring approximately 15 metres (49 ft) × 15 metres (49 ft) and with a capacity of more than 530 m³, was built partly into the hillside and lined with hydraulic mortar. A possible channel connected it with a second water installation nearby.

Additional Nabataean remains include the foundations of a bridge crossing Wadi Khalil, identified by the excavators as the only known ancient bridge in Wadi Musa at the time of excavation. A Nabataean inscription mentioning Alahat, a goddess, together with architectural fragments discovered nearby, led the excavators to suggest that the bridge may have been associated with a temple. Two inscribed Nabataean tombstones, one bearing the name of the deceased, provide evidence for a nearby cemetery.

Excavated Nabataean domestic remains include houses, courtyards, and paved rooms. One room with hexagonal paving was interpreted by the excavators as possibly belonging to a higher status building. A notable discovery was a disturbed olive press in Area I, dated to the early 1st century CE, which the site's excavators considered the earliest known Nabataean olive press, predating two presses at Khirbet edh-Dharih. The excavators interpreted the press as evidence that olive cultivation formed part of the Nabataean economy, in contrast to Strabo's account (late 1st century BCE/early 1st century CE) that the Nabataeans did not cultivate olives. Smaller finds from the Nabataean occupation include pottery, coins, a glass vessel, and a toy horse made of terracotta.

=== Roman and Byzantine periods ===
Following a decline after the 2nd century CE, the settlement may have experienced a short period of abandonment before being reoccupied in the early 4th century. The Late Roman village was smaller than its Nabataean predecessor but continued to use earlier water installations and added new domestic cisterns. In the site's center, Nabataean structures were damaged during the rebuilding process.

Pottery and construction techniques indicate continuity with Nabataean traditions into late antiquity, including parallels with the nearby az-Zurraba pottery workshop. During the Late Byzantine period, the settlement expanded again, with evidence of Christian presence including carved crosses and a monumental building in the southern part of the site that the excavators tentatively identified as a church.

=== Early Islamic period ===
The Early Islamic occupation of Khirbat an-Nawāfla was substantial, suggesting continued settlement after the Muslim conquest. The excavators noted the contrast with Petra, where archaeological evidence has indicated only limited post-conquest occupation. Excavations uncovered a large cross-vaulted building, houses with fine architectural features, and finds indicating the continuation of Christian traditions, including a lamp decorated with crosses and a conical limestone bread stamp comparable to those still used in Eastern Christian communities. Now displayed at the Jordan Museum in Amman, the bread stamp is slightly damaged but retains a low relief cross and two dots.

A funerary inscription using the Kufic script and dated, using the Islamic calendar, to Jumada II (sixth month) of AH 170 (787 CE) provides evidence for activity at the site under the Abbasid Caliphate. The excavators noted it as, at the time, the only known inscription of the Early Abbasid period (750–878 CE) recorded from the southern Bilad al-Sham region.

=== Ayyubid, Mamluk and Ottoman periods ===
The Ayyubid/Mamluk village represented the site's greatest extent, including a well-preserved olive press over 39 m long that reused part of a monumental Nabataean wall along with an earlier Umayyad/Abbasid press. Other finds from this phase included large quantities of marine fish bone, grinding stones (some reused Neolithic tools from al-Basiṭ), an iron sickle, and iron slag interpreted as debris from blacksmithing utensils. The excavators proposed identifying the site with the village of al-'Udmal mentioned by the early 14th-century historian Al-Nuwayri as a stopping place of Sultan Baybars during his 1276 journey between Egypt and al-Karak. Two Ayyubid/Mamluk cemeteries were documented; one of them contained only child burials apart from a single adult female interred with an infant, a pattern the excavators noted is echoed in a burial custom still practiced among Wadi Musa families.

The Early Ottoman occupation is represented by terraced houses with arched roofs, kitchens, a tabun oven, and pottery showing continuity with earlier local traditions.

=== Modern period ===
The modern village of an-Nawāfla was established in the late 19th century by the Bedouin an-Nawāfla tribe, who built stone houses among the archaeological remains. According to local tradition, the area had previously appeared barren and was marked by scattered stone clusters (rujūm). The village was abandoned in 1975 when residents moved to newer housing higher on the slopes, although olive and fruit terraces around the former settlement continued to be cultivated.

== Research history and conservation ==
Plans for a tourist village at Khirbat an-Nawāfla led the Department of Antiquities of Jordan to conduct salvage excavations in 1997, followed by additional works between 1998 and 2000. The project investigated several areas of the site and included the conservation of architectural remains; A traditional early 20th-century olive press was relocated and restored near the ancient one. The village has since been adapted for use as a resort hotel.

== See also ==
- Wadi Musa#Archaeology
- Khirbet edh-Dharih
- Khirbet et-Tannur

== Bibliography ==
=== Sources ===
- 'Amr, Khairieh; al-Momani, Ahmed; Al-Nawafleh, Naif; Al-Nawafleh, Sami (2000). "Summary Results of the Archaeological Project at Khirbat an-Nawāfla/Wādi Mūsā". Annual of the Department of Antiquities of Jordan. 44: 231–255.
- 'Amr, Khairieh (2012). "Wadi Musa in der Antike". Begleitbuch zur Ausstellung PETRA – Wunder in der Wüste. Auf den Spuren von J. L. Burckhardt alias Scheich Ibrahim (PDF) (in German). p. 142.
- Kakish, Randa (2014). "Ancient Bread Stamps from Jordan" (PDF). Mediterranean Archaeology and Archaeometry. 14 (2): 19–31.

=== Further reading ===
- 'Amr, Khairieh (2006). "Die Kreuzritter und die Oliven von les Vaux Moïses". In Ritterhausgesellschaft Bubikon (ed.). Die Kreuzzüge. Petra – Eine Spurensuche (in German). Tann: Eristra Druck. pp. 21–26.
- Karim, Juma'a Mahmoud (1999). "نقش كوفي من وادي موسى - البتراء يعود للعصر العباسي الأول: دراسة نقشية تحليلية" [Kufic Inscription Dated to the Abbasid Period from Wadi Musa–Petra: Epigraphical Study]. Dirāsāt: Human and Social Sciences (in Arabic). 26 (supplement): 670–685.
