= Abdʿobodat =

Nabatean Stonemason in Hegra, a UNESCO World Heritage Site

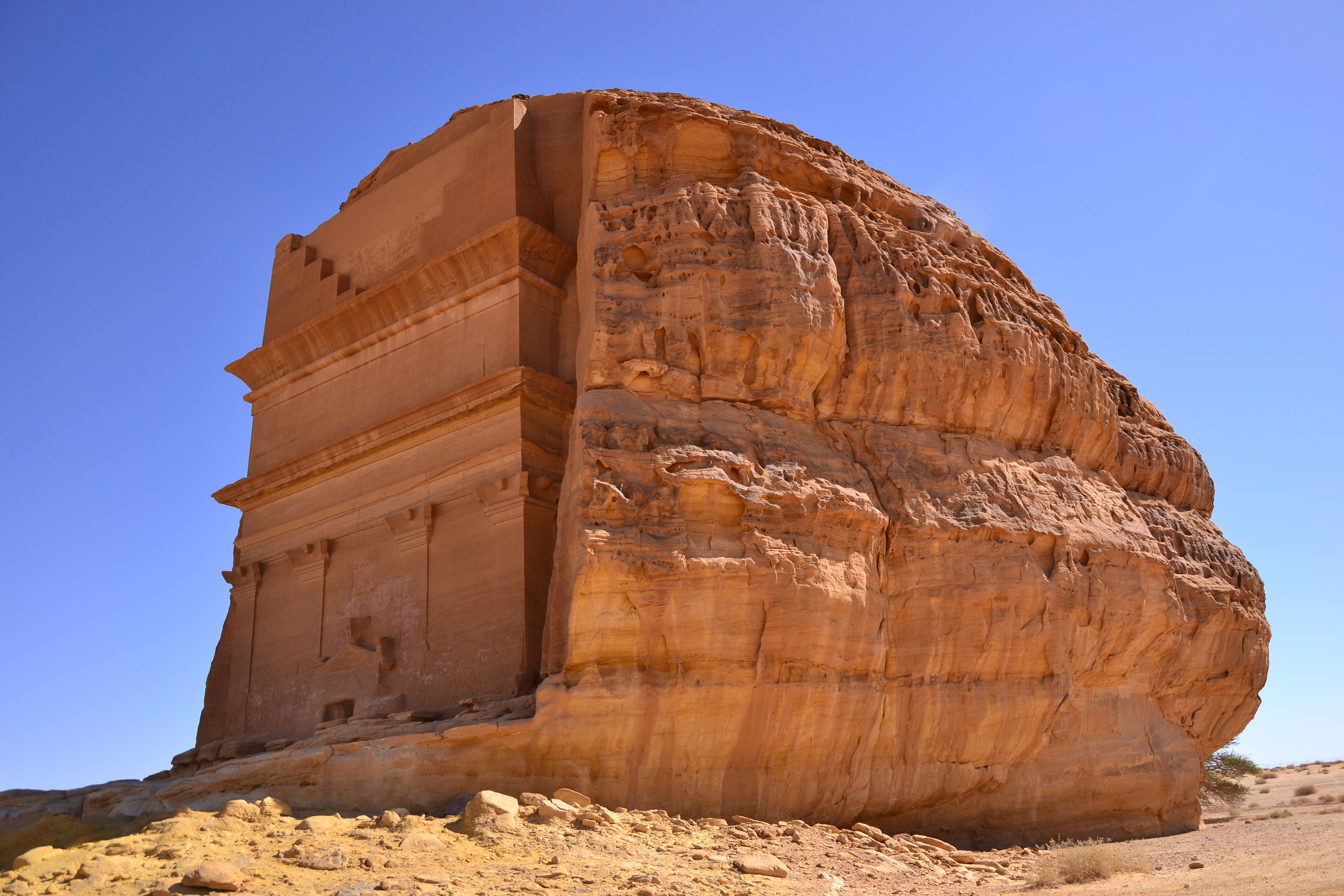
Monumental rock-cut tomb in Hegra

Abdʿobodat (Nabataean Arabic: 𐢗𐢃𐢅𐢗𐢃𐢅𐢞, romanized: ʿbdʿbdt) son of Wahballahi, was a 1st-century Nabatean Arab stonemason who worked in the city of Hegra, and constructed a number of monumental rock-cut tombs.

He is named by inscriptions on five of the tomb facades Hegra as the executing craftsman. On the basis of the inscriptions, four of the facades can be dated to the reigns of kings Aretas IV and Malichus II. Abd'obodat belonged to a family of professional stonemasons. He inherited the family business from his father Wahballahi and his uncle Abdharetat and succeeded them in at least one workshop in the second generation of Nabatean architects. Abd'obodat is considered to be the main representative of one of the two main schools of the Nabataean stonemasons, to which his father, his uncle belonged.
