= Wadi al-Hasa =

Valley in western Jordan

Wadi al-Hasa (Arabic: وادي الحسا) is a wadi in western Jordan. It is located between the Karak and Tafilah governorates.

== Geography ==
The wadi is very wide and long and flows into the Dead Sea at Al-Safi. Its length is approximately 40 kilometres (25 mi), and it contains many historical and modern facilities and farms. At no time during the year does the water stop flowing. There are many springs and other sources that feed it, particularly in the section flowing through the governorate of Tafilah. It is longer and wider than Wadi al-Moujib, which is located to the north.

The wadi is part of the eastern Dead Sea basin. The waters of Wadi al-Hasa feed the Dead Sea; in winter they accumulate in the southern part of the Dead Sea. The area of the wadi's drainage basin is approximately 2,500 km^{2} (970 sq mi). The wadi collects its waters from the desert wadis and streams whose basins reach the al-Jafr region to the east, and then flow down to the Jordan Rift Valley and into the Dead Sea.

== Water use ==
The wadi area is intensely used by farmers who use the water for irrigation, mostly for vegetables like tomatoes and melons.

In 1999, Jordan built a dam atop the wadi, known as the Al-Tannur Dam. It has a storage capacity of about 16.8 million cubic metres (590×10^{6} cu ft). The wadi has special significance for walks and for hiking. The route spans about 30 kilometres (19 mi), and is a popular destination for adventure tourists in Jordan for walkers and hikers. A group of hiking clubs have been organized, most of which end at the Jordan Valley, where there are many mineral hot springs, which are said to have many health benefits.

Throughout the wadi there are many farms, most of them vegetable farms, above stream of the Al-Tannur Dam. There are also olive trees and clovers. There are fountains and streams that are suitable for drinking which are used by the local residents. There is natural scenery and it contains bodies of water that have formed over time because the stones were carved with water, reaching a depth of more than six meters. The wadi is rich in fish, caught by both residents and visitors.

== Hebrew Bible ==
Zared (also Zered) is a name used in the Torah for a brook and its valley. It is mentioned briefly in Deuteronomy 2:13–14 and more extensively in Numbers 21:12–13, as the place where the Israelites camp on their final approach to Moab. From the context it is understood that it lay in Edom, south of the border to Moab which is marked by the River Arnon, modern Wadi Mujib.

According to Peter C. Craigie, Zered's "exact location is uncertain."

== Roman Empire ==
Wadi al-Hasa was a key link in the chain of forts protecting the eastern frontier of the Roman Empire. Emperor Diocletian expanded the Limes Arabicus, which extended south from Damascus to Wadi al-Hasa. The Limes Palestina extended south from Wadi al-Hasa to Aela ('Aqaba).

== Archaeological research ==
=== Palaeolithic ===
The archaeological excavations at Wadi al-Hasa have contributed to a rethinking in archaeology of the use of tools made from bone or bone-like material. Some of the evidence at the site of Ain el-Buhira, a site located at the eastern end of the wadi. The site is characterized by a lake, and sediments and stone formations like marls and tufa formations that give insight into the drainage system that was built at the wadi in the Upper Pleistocene period, between 24,000 and 19,000 BP. Coinman suggested in 1996 that both bone and blade technologies were more common in this period than previously thought (see Levantine Upper and Epi-Palaeolithic).

=== Nabataean sites ===
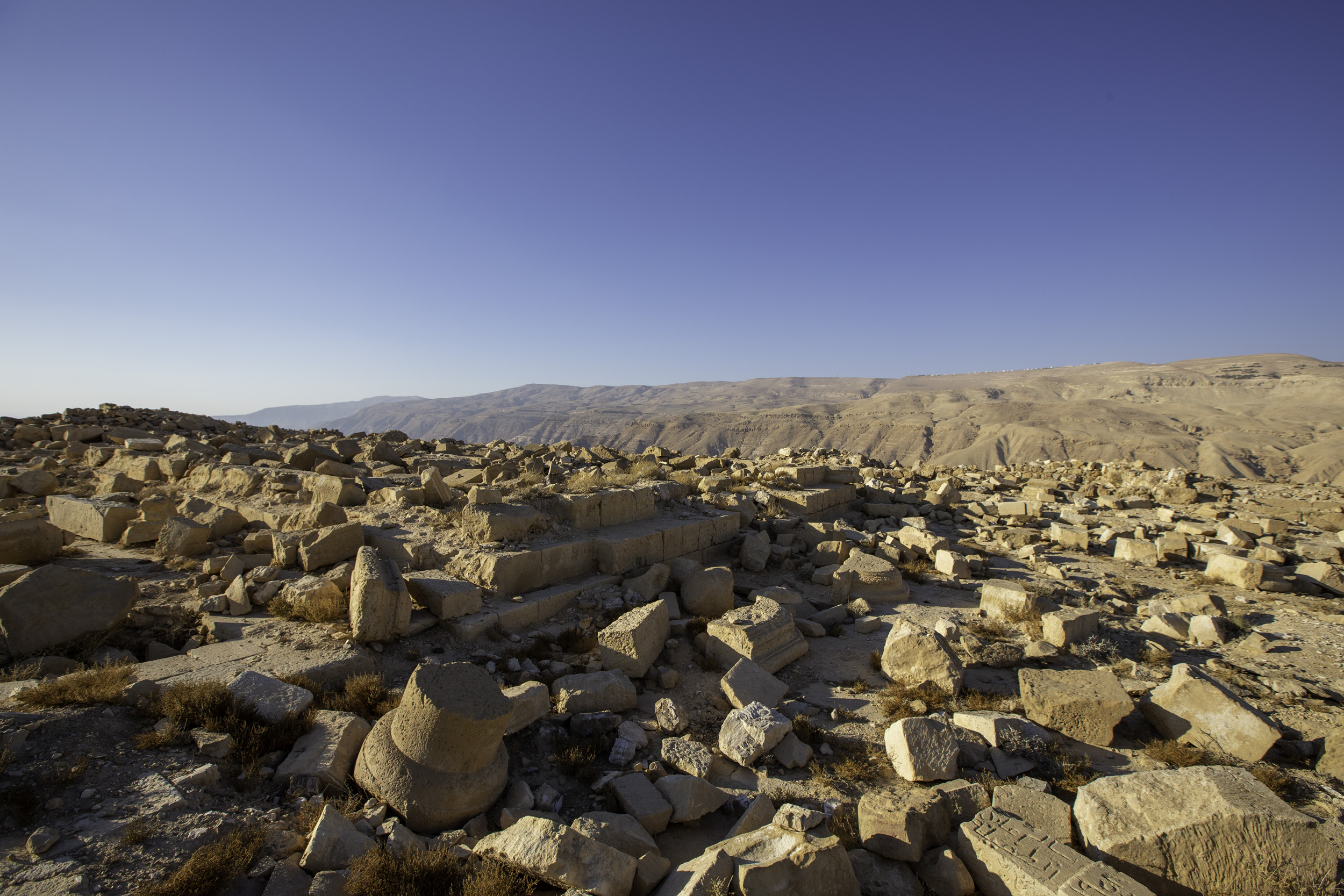
Ruins of the temple of Dushara at Khirbet et-Tannur

The Nabataean temple at Khirbet et-Tannur stands on a mountaintop at the confluence of a tributary, Wadi La'ban, and Wadi Hasa. Further up Wadi La'ban is the ancient village of Khirbet ed-Dharih with its own Nabataean sanctuary. Both shrines were dedicated to the Nabataean deity Dushara.

== See also ==
- Qasr or Khan al-Hasa, fortified Ottoman pilgrims hostel on Syrian Hajj route
- Hasa Station (Mahattat al-Hasa) on Hejaz railway
- Hot springs at Burbeita (in Hasa valley) and Afra (in valley of a tributary)
