= Khirbet edh-Dharih =

Ancient site with Nabataean temple

- خربة الذريح (Arabic)
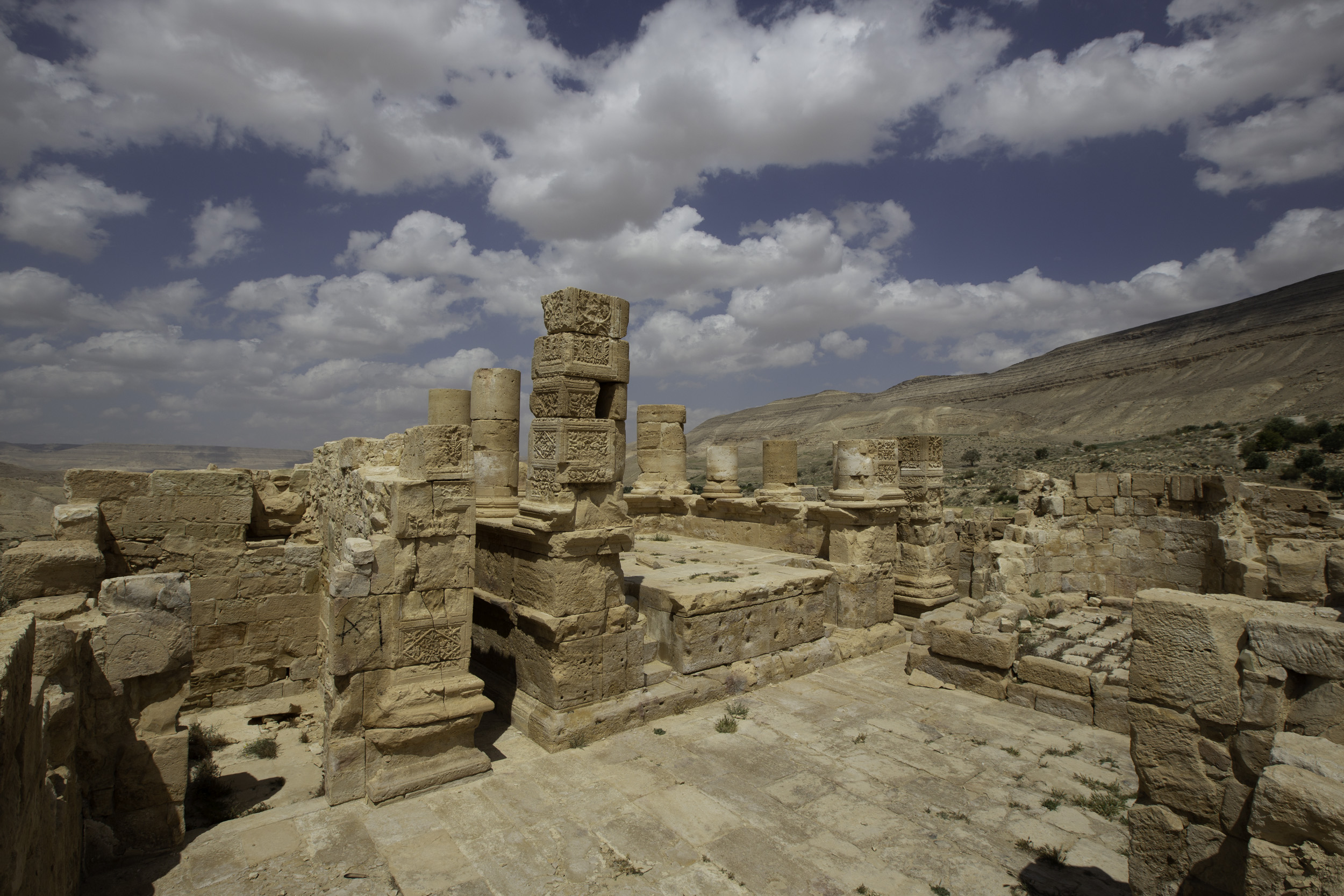
- The Nabataean temple in 2013

- Location in Jordan
- 30°54′26″N 35°42′10″E
- Periods: PNA; Edomite; main: Nabataean, Roman, Byzantine and Rashidun to Abbasid periods (largest population); Fatimid period
- Location: Tafilah, Jordan

History
- Built: c. 5000 BC

Site notes
- Excavation dates: 1984-2007
- Archaeologists: Zeidoun Al-Muheisen and François Villeneuve
- Discovered: 1818 by James Mangles and Charles Irby
- Public access: yes

Khirbet edh-Dharih (Arabic: خربة الذريح) is a multi-period archaeological site which mainly flourished during the Nabataean period, when a prosperous settlement with a religious sanctuary stood there. The site is located on the King's Highway in southern Jordan, about 70 km (45 miles) north of the ancient Nabataean capital city, Petra, or in caravaning terms at the 3rd station from it, the nearest modern town being Tafileh. The earliest signs of human habitation at the site are from the Neolithic period and more specifically the Pottery Neolithic A (PNA) period, circa 6000-4000 BCE.

== Etymology ==
In Arabic, khirbet means ruin and is commonly used to describe a ruined settlement or an archaeological site.

According to Taj al-Aroos Arabic Dictionary, the word al-dharih, also transliterated as adh-dharih etc., means hills or highlands. Khirbet edh-Dharih therefore can be translated as 'the ruins of edh-Dharih' or 'the ruins of the highlands'. The site name reflects the topography of the site.

The Arabic words are transliterated variously: khirbet and khirbat, Dharih and Darieh, and the definite article as al, el, adh, edh, ad and ed.

== Habitation periods ==
Archaeological excavations have discovered proof of human habitation at the site in successive settlements dating to Pottery Neolithic A, the Early Bronze Age, Late Iron Age and through the Hellenistic period; after the well-documented Roman period, a densely populated village covered the site in the Late Antique (Byzantine) and Early Islamic periods, followed by an inpoverished one with just a few spread-out inhabitants in the Fatimid period (10th-11th centuries).

== Archaeology ==
The temple at Khirbet edh-Dharih was first discovered in 1818 by two British naval officers travelling through the region of Syria, Charles Irby and James Mangles. The site has been excavated by archaeologists over 13 seasons between the years 1984 and 2007. The importance of the site centers around its ability to provide important answers to questions about life outside of the capital at Petra during the Nabatean period. In particular, the site sheds light on aspects of religious, social, and economic life in the Nabatean period.

=== Findings ===
The site is surrounded by fertile agricultural land and well-watered by spring water, such as the La'ban spring, all of which contributed to making the site a natural center for human habitation.

Archaeological evidence indicates that Khirbet edh-Dharih was settled as early as the Pre-Pottery Neolithic period (PPN; 6000-4000 BCE) and continued into the Bronze Age. Jordanian archaeologist Zeidoun Al-Muheisen and his French colleague François Villeneuve argue that Edomite artifacts found at the site confirm that it was settled during the Edomite period. The site became of particular significance in the Nabataean period, however, there is evidence to suggest continuous settlement at the site throughout the Roman, Byzantine, and Islamic periods.

Archaeologists have found a stable, early-settled site, which used the three nearby springs to irrigate its agricultural land. By the Nabataean period it had grown into a prosperous town complete with a monumental temple complex.

== Geography of the area ==
Al-Muheisen describes the location of Edh-Dharih: "Situated at the northern end of Wadi al-Le'ban (وادي اللعبان) in the south of Jordan. Wadi al-Le'ban, located northeast of the city of Tafileh is one of the main tributaries of Wadi al-Hasa, which includes many water basins, the most important of which are the Thahr al-La'ban and Ayn al-La'ban (La'ban Spring; also spelled Le'ban). This region consists of a relatively flat plateau which is 10 km from north to south and 30 km from east to west. The climate and vegetation of the plateau varied widely, in some areas the land was very fertile in others not at all. The land becomes less fertile as you move east towards the desert. The area to the west of the Wadi al-La'ban was cultivated with grains, especially wheat. It enjoys a traditional Mediterranean climate with its wet winters and dry summers. The highlands receive most of the rain and even snow. The longest valleys of the plateau are less than 10 km long, with the exception of the Wadi al-La'ban, which connects to the Al-Hasma valley with a length of 25 km stretching from its source in Mount Tannur (Jebel et-Tannur).

The red soil of this region is classified as Mediterranean terra rossa, which is commonly found in the Mediterranean basin. The area is well known for its many springs (Arabic: ayn sing., uyun pl.), such as Ain edh-Dharih, Ain eth-Thaban, Ain al-Fadhah, and these springs are an important source for the irrigation of agricultural lands. Khirbet edh-Dharih is famous for the cultivation of olive trees, grapevines, grains, cereals, and various types of vegetables.

The average rainfall in the region is 200 mm per annum.

Khirbet edh-Dharih was distinguished by its strategic geographic location, due to its proximity to the major trade routes, in addition to the minor subsidiary trade routes leading to the Jordan Valley, Palestine, and Gaza. The importance of the site is also due, especially in the Nabataean period, to its proximity to the temple of Khirbet et-Tannur, which is about to the 7 km north. Khirbet et-Tannur, which was built on top of the high mountain of Tannur, was one of the most important religious centers and a Nabatean pilgrimage site. This site is also important due to its proximity to the hot springs of Burbeita and Afra, located a few kilometers away to the west, in Wadi Hasa and one of its tributaries, respectively.

== See also ==
- Khirbat an-Nawafla
