= Nabataeans =

Arab people who inhabited northern Arabia and the southern Levant

- A map of the Roman Empire under Hadrian (ruled AD 117–138), showing the location of the Arabes Nabataei in the desert regions around the Roman province of Arabia Petraea (lower right)

Languages
- Nabataean Arabic (native); Nabataean Aramaic (commercial and official purposes)

Religion
- Nabataean polytheism; Christianity

Related ethnic groups
- Edomites, Arabs

The Nabataeans, also spelled Nabateans (/ˌnæbəˈtiːənz/; Nabataean Aramaic / Nabataean Arabic: 𐢕𐢃𐢋𐢈, romanized: nbṭw, vocalized: Nabāṭū; Arabic: الأنباط, romanized: al-ʾanbāṭ), (Note: Singular النبطي, an-Nabaṭī; compare Ancient Greek: Ναβαταῖος, romanized: Nabataîos; Latin: Nabataeus) were an ancient Arab people who inhabited the southern Levant and northern Arabia. Their settlements—most prominently the assumed capital city of Raqmu (present-day Petra, Jordan)—gave the name Nabatene (Ancient Greek: Ναβατηνή, romanized: Nabatēnḗ) to the Arabian borderland that stretched from the Euphrates to the Red Sea. The Nabateans emerged as a distinct civilization and political entity between the 4th and 2nd centuries BC, with the Nabataean Kingdom centered around a loosely controlled trading network that brought considerable wealth and influence across the ancient world.

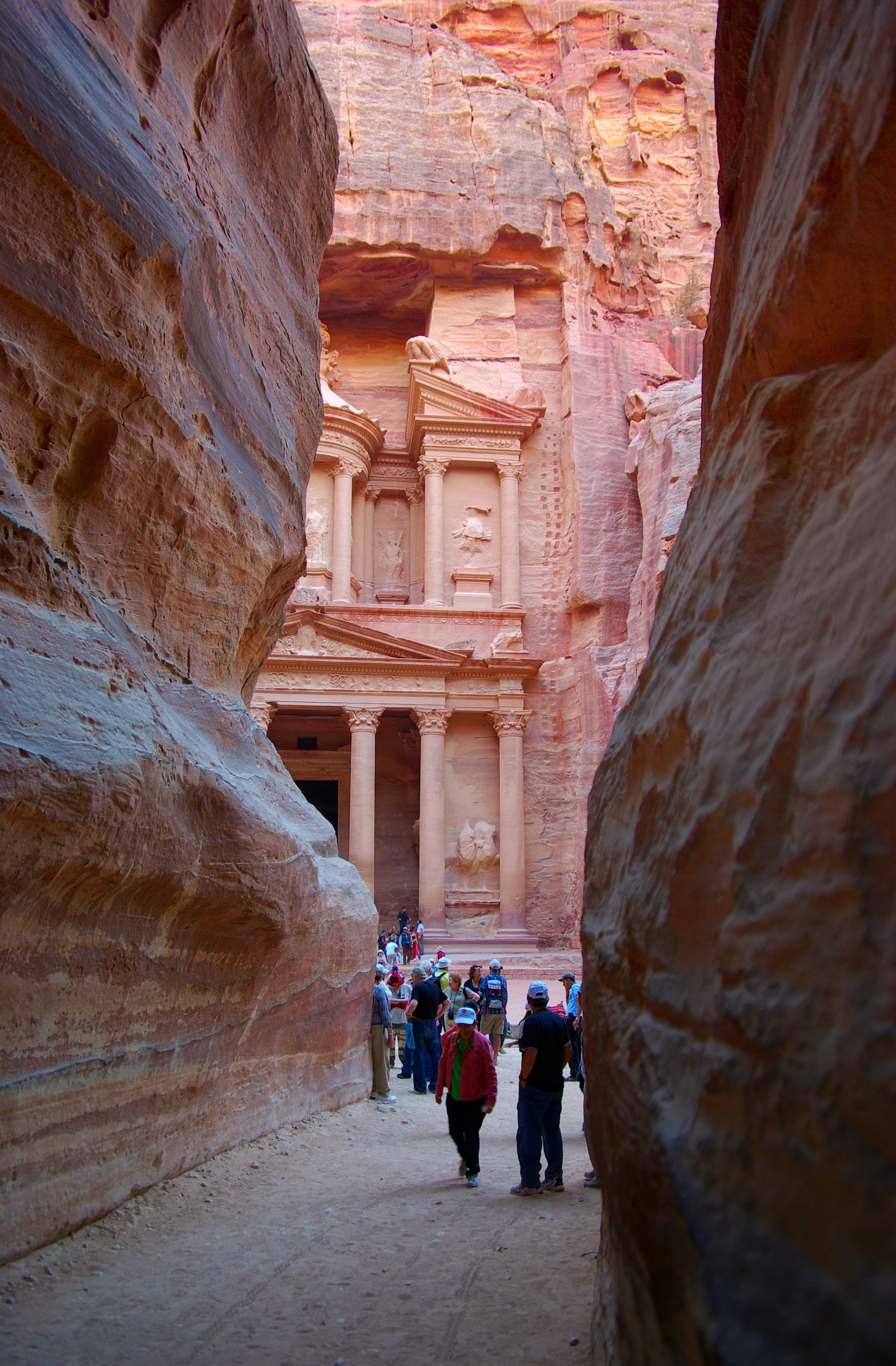
Al-Khazneh (the Treasury) in Petra, Jordan

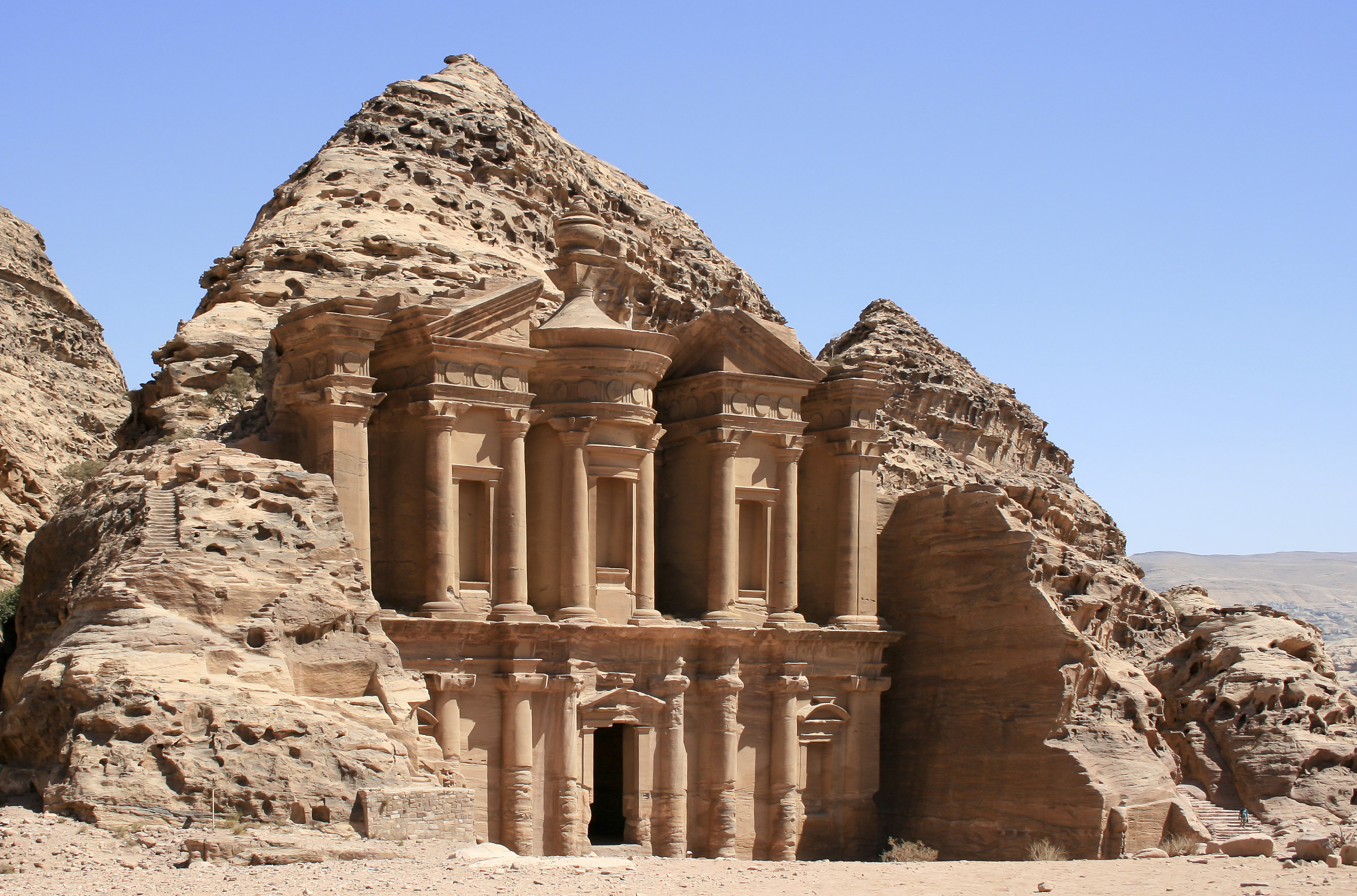
Ad-Deir (the Monastery) in Petra

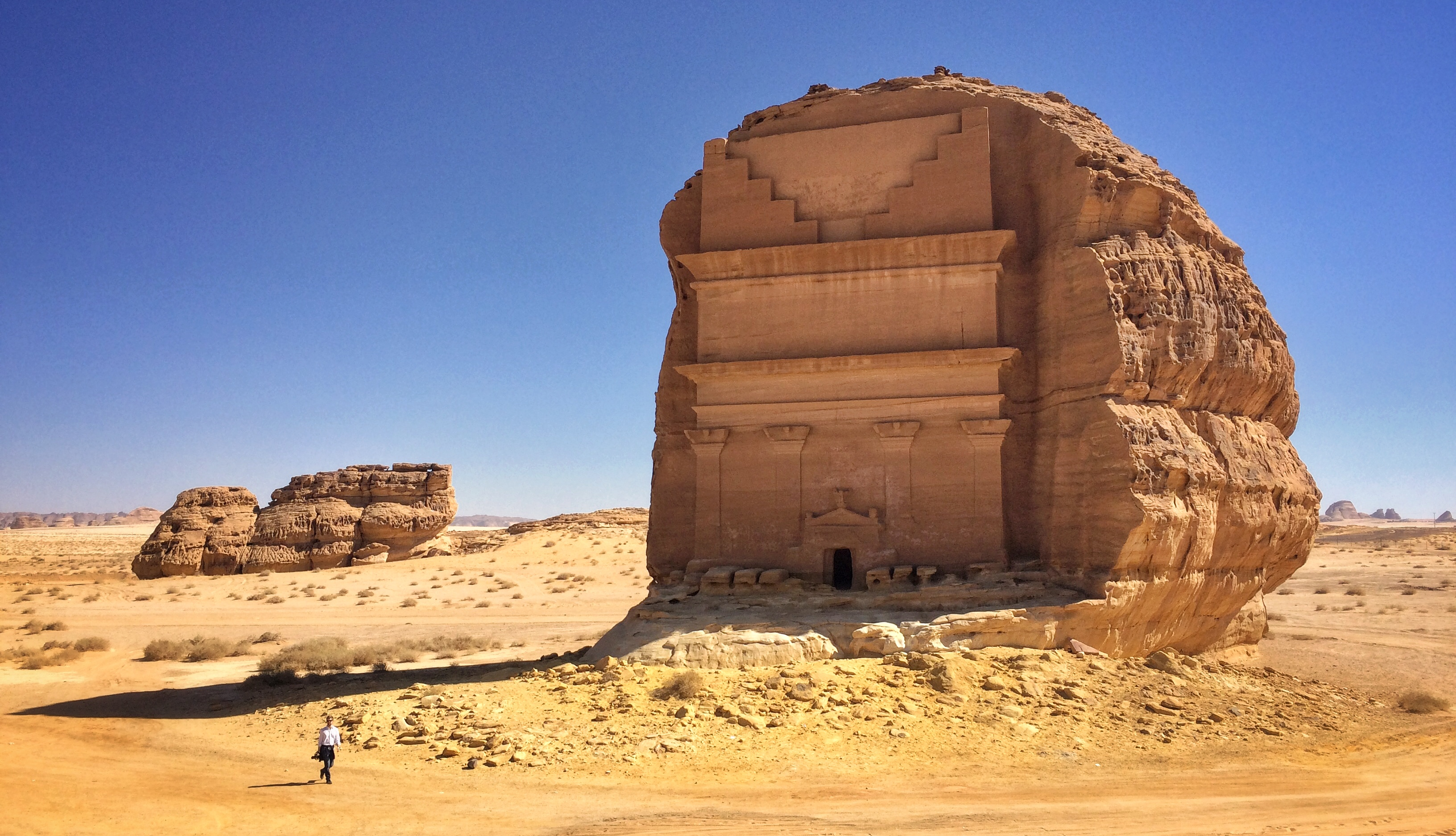
Qaṣr al-Farīd, the largest tomb in Mada’in Salih (Hegra), Saudi Arabia

Described as fiercely independent by contemporary Greco-Roman accounts, the Nabataeans were annexed into the Roman Empire by Emperor Trajan in 106 AD. Nabataeans' individual culture, easily identified by their characteristic finely potted painted ceramics, was adopted into the larger Greco-Roman culture. They converted to Christianity during the Byzantine period. They have been described as one of the most gifted peoples of the ancient world and one of the "most unjustly forgotten".

== Name ==
The name of the Nabataeans may be derived from the same root as Akkadian nabatu, "to shine brightly".

The self-designation "Nabataean" is recorded in five contemporary inscriptions – one Palmyrene, one Greek and three Safaitic.

== History ==
=== Hellenistic period ===
The Nabataeans were an Arab tribe who had come under significant Babylonian-Aramaean influence. The first mention of the Nabataeans dates from 312/311 BC, when they were attacked at Sela or perhaps at Petra without success by the Hellene-Greek Antigonus I's officer Athenaeus in the course of the Third War of the Diadochi; at that time Hieronymus of Cardia, a Seleucid officer, mentions the Nabataeans in a battle report. About 50 BC Greek historian Diodorus Siculus cites Hieronymus in his report and adds the following: "Just as the Seleucids had tried to subdue them, so the Romans made several attempts to get their hands on that lucrative trade.". The architecture has Hellenic influence.

They wrote a letter to Antigonus in Syriac letters, and Aramaic continued as the language of their coins and inscriptions when the tribe grew into a kingdom and profited by the decay of the Seleucids to extend its borders northward over the more fertile country east of the Jordan River. They occupied Hauran, and in about 85 BC their king Aretas III became lord of Damascus and Coele-Syria.

==== The Abgarids and Osroene in Mesopotamia ====
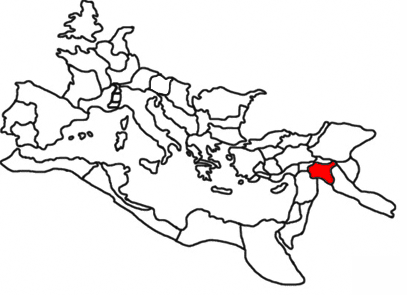
Roman Empire with its province of Osroene highlighted in red. The province was formed after the absorption of the Kingdom of Osroene, ruled by the Nabatean Abgarid dynasty

The kingdom of Osroene in Upper Mesopotamia, with its capital at Edessa, was founded in 134 BC in the aftermath of the collapse of the Seleucid Empire by a Nabataean tribe, with the ruling dynasty, the Abgarids, coming from their numbers. It shifted between semi-autonomy and independence, then being a client state of the Parthian Empire and the Roman Empire, to being fully incorporated into the latter as a province in 214 AD.

==== Nabataean Kingdom ====
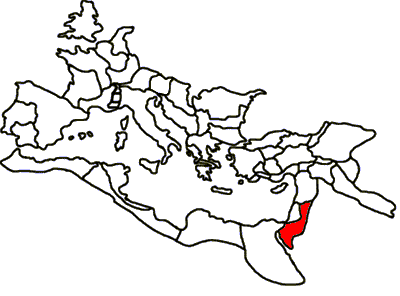
The Roman province of Arabia Petraea, created from the Nabataean kingdom

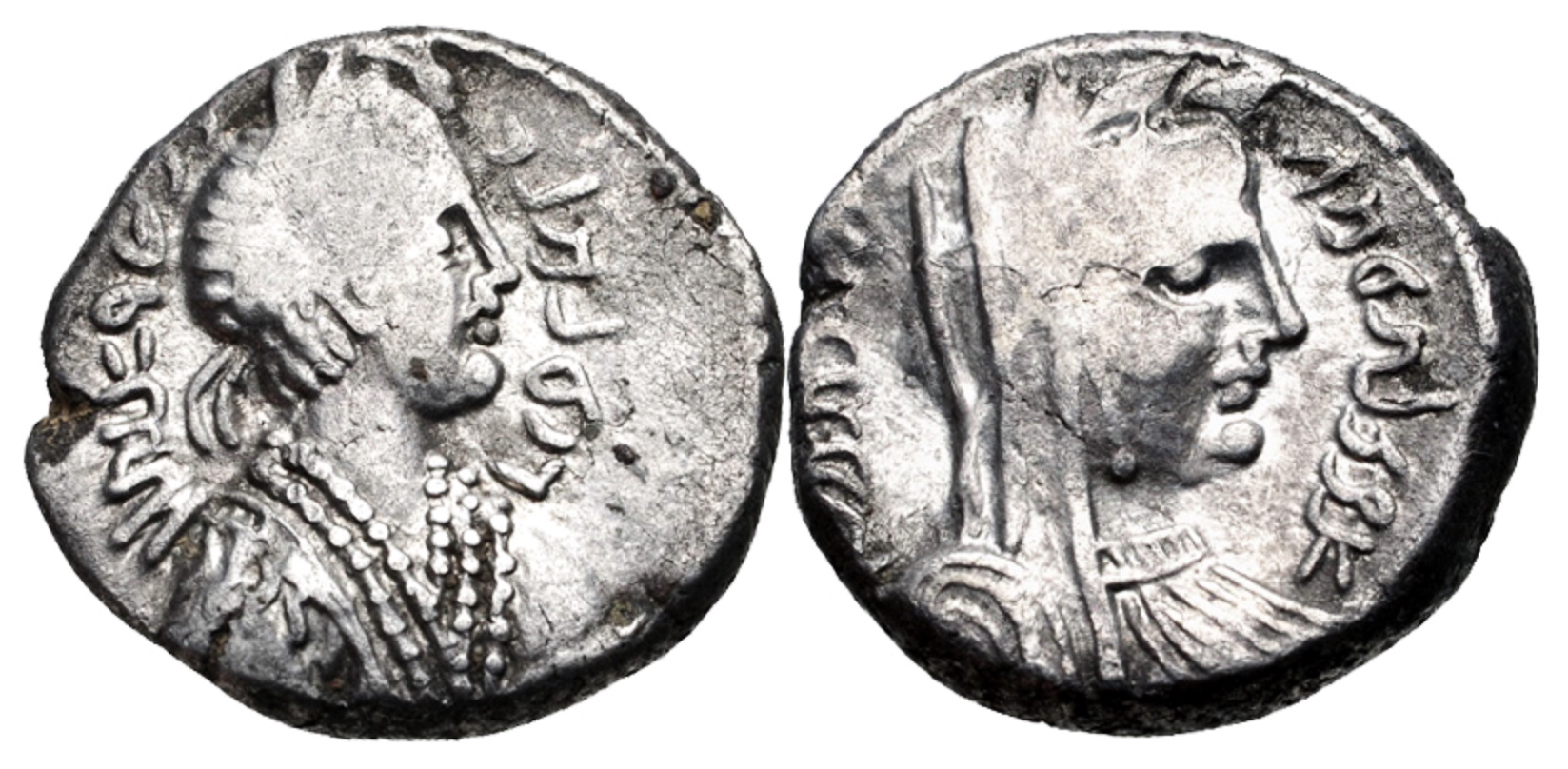
Silver drachm of Malichos II with Shaqilat II

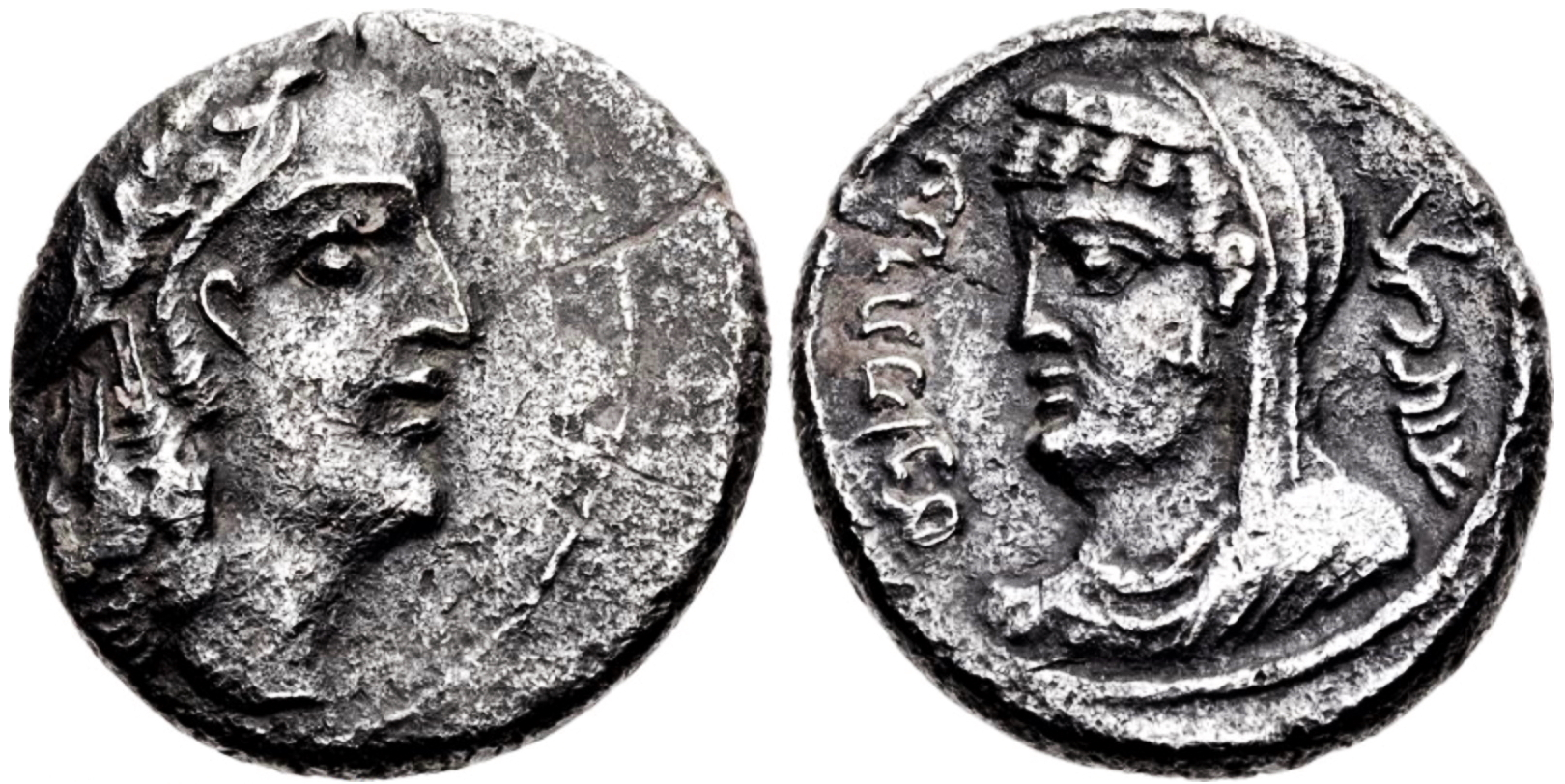
Silver drachm of Obodas II with Hagaru

Petra was rapidly built in the 1st century BC and developed a population estimated at 20,000. The Nabataeans were allies of the first Hasmoneans in their struggles against the Seleucid monarchs. They then became rivals of the Judaean dynasty and a chief element in the disorders that invited Pompey's intervention in Judaea. According to popular historian Paul Johnson, many Nabataeans were forcefully converted to Judaism by Hasmonean king Alexander Jannaeus. It was this king who, after putting down a local rebellion, invaded and occupied the Nabataean towns of Moab and Gilead and imposed a tribute. Obodas I knew that Alexander would attack, so was able to ambush Alexander's forces near Gaulane destroying the Judaean army in 90 BC.

The Roman military was not very successful in their campaigns against the Nabataeans. In 62 BC, Marcus Aemilius Scaurus accepted a bribe of 300 talents to lift the siege of Petra, partly because of the difficult terrain and the fact that he had run out of supplies. Hyrcanus II, who was a friend of King Aretas, was despatched by Scaurus to the king to buy peace. In so obtaining peace, Aretas retained all his possessions, including Damascus, and became a Roman vassal.

In 32 BC, during King Malichus I's reign, Herod the Great, with the support of Cleopatra, started a war against Nabataea. The war began with Herod plundering Nabataea with a large cavalry force and occupying Dium. After this defeat, the Nabataean forces regrouped near Canatha in Syria but were attacked and routed. Cleopatra's general Athenion sent Canathans to the aid of the Nabataeans, and this force crushed Herod's army, which then fled to Ormiza. One year later, Herod's army overran Nabataea.

After an earthquake in Judaea, the Nabateans rebelled and invaded, but Herod at once crossed the Jordan River to Philadelphia (modern Amman), and both sides set up camp. The Nabataeans under Elthemus refused to give battle, so Herod forced the issue when he attacked their camp. A confused mass of Nabataeans gave battle but were defeated. Once they had retreated to their defences, Herod laid siege to the camp, and over time some of the defenders surrendered. The remaining Nabataean forces offered 500 talents for peace, but this was rejected. Lacking water, the Nabataeans were forced out of their camp and battled but were defeated. King Aretas IV defeated Herod Antipas, son of Herod the Great, in a battle after he intended to divorce his daughter Phasaelis.

=== Roman period ===
An ally of the Roman Empire, the Nabataean kingdom flourished throughout the 1st century. Its power extended far into Arabia along the Red Sea to Yemen, and Petra was a cosmopolitan marketplace, though its commerce was diminished by the rise of the Eastern trade route from Myos Hormos to Coptos on the Nile. Under the Pax Romana, the Nabataeans lost their warlike and nomadic habits and became a sober, acquisitive, orderly people, wholly intent on trade and agriculture. The kingdom was a bulwark between Rome and the wild hordes of the desert except in the time of Trajan, who reduced Petra and converted the Nabataean client state into the Roman province of Arabia Petraea in 105. There was a Nabataean community in Puteoli, in southern Italy, that reached its end around the establishment of the province.

Five Greek-Nabataean bilingual inscriptions, known as the Ruwafa inscriptions, date to AD 165–169. Ascribed to an auxiliary military unit drawn from the Roman-allied Thamud tribe, they describe the temple in which they were placed and recognize the authority of the emperors Marcus Aurelius and Lucius Verus.

By the 3rd century the Nabataeans had stopped writing in Aramaic and begun writing in Greek. By the 5th century they had converted to Christianity. Their lands were divided between the new Qahtanite Arab tribal kingdoms of the Byzantine vassals, the Ghassanid Arabs, and the Himyarite vassals, the Kingdom of Kinda in North Arabia.

== Culture ==
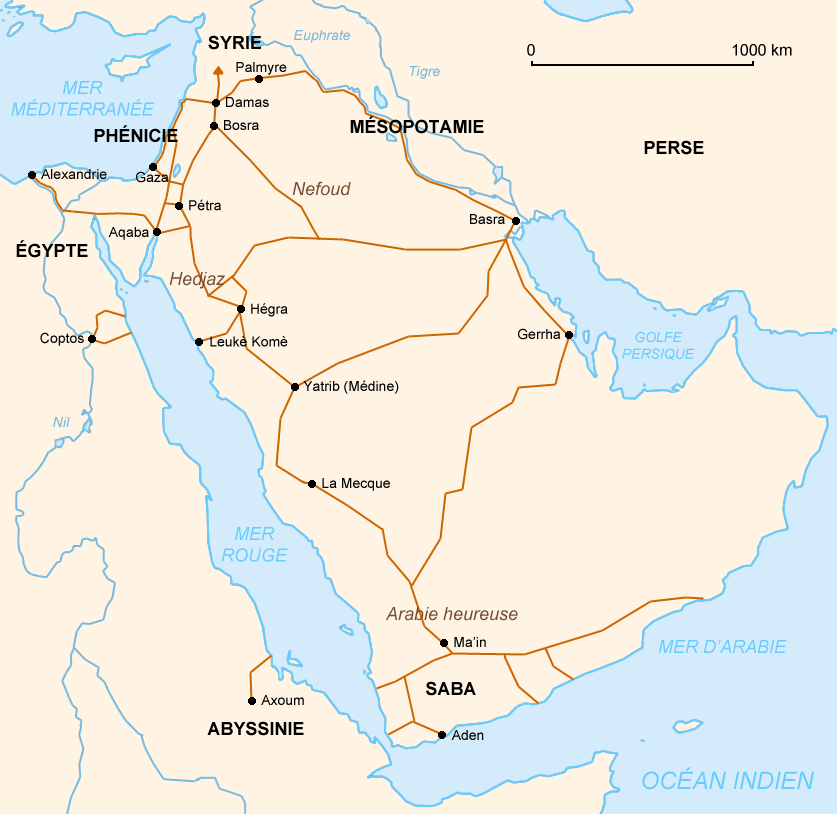
Nabataean trade routes

Many examples of graffiti and inscriptions—largely of names and greetings—document the area of Nabataean culture, which extended as far north as the north end of the Dead Sea, and testify to widespread literacy; but except for a few letters no Nabataean literature has survived, nor was any noted in antiquity. Onomastic analysis has suggested that Nabataean culture may have had multiple influences. Classical references to the Nabataeans begin with Diodorus Siculus. They suggest that the Nabataeans' trade routes and the origins of their goods were regarded as trade secrets, and disguised in tales that should have strained outsiders' credulity.

Diodorus Siculus describes them as a strong tribe of some 10,000 warriors, preeminent among the nomads of Arabia, eschewing agriculture, fixed houses, and the use of wine, but adding to pastoral pursuits a profitable trade with the seaports in frankincense, myrrh and spices from Arabia Felix, as well as a trade with Egypt in bitumen from the Dead Sea. Their arid country was their best safeguard, for the bottle-shaped cisterns for rain-water which they excavated in the rocky or clay-rich soil were carefully concealed from invaders.

=== Women ===
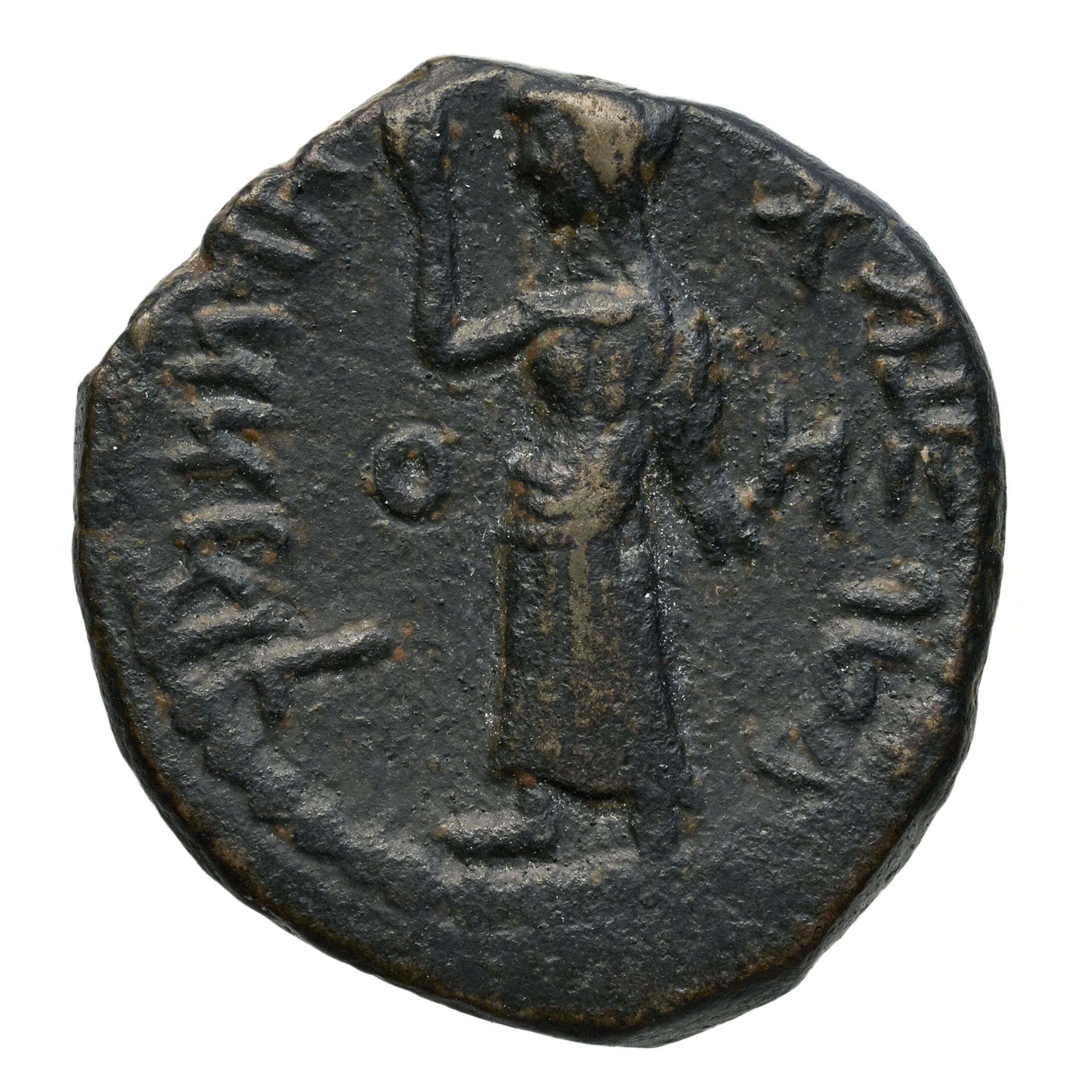
Queen Huldu of Nabatea depicted on a drachma

Based on coins, inscriptions and non-Nabatean contemporary sources, Nabataean women seem to have had many legal rights. Inscriptions on tombs demonstrate the equality of property rights between man and woman and women's rights in matters of inheritance and also their ability to make decisions about their own property. That set the Nabateans apart from the attitudes on a woman's role in society by their neighbours in the region. Women also participated in religious activities, and had a right to visit the temples and make sacrifices.

Archeological evidence strongly suggest that the Nabataean women had a role in the social and political life by the 1st century AD, which is shown by the fact that Nabatean queens were depicted on coins, both independently and together with their spouse the king. The assumption to be made from this were that they ruled together and that the Nabatean queens and other female members were given or already had political importance and status. It is likely other Nabatean women benefited from this by extension.

Though Nabatean culture seems to have favored male succession rather than female or equal succession, it seems plausible that like their neighbouring Ptolemaic dynasty and the Seleucids, marrying a female member of the Nabatean royal family reinforced a ruler's position or one whose claim to the throne was not as strong as his wife's. The Nabatean royal house, like the Ptolemaic and Seleucids, later adopted sibling marriage.

=== Fashion ===
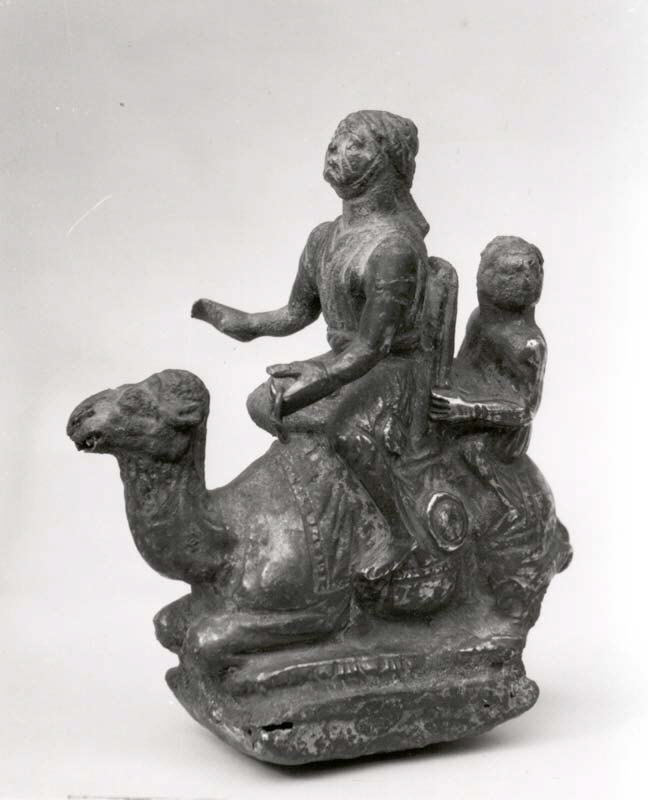
Camel and riders, Nabataean silver sculpture, c. 1st c. BC–1st c. AD. Metropolitan Museum of Art

Not much is known for certain about the fashions of ancient Nabateans and before the Hellenization and Romanization of the region, but based on extant clothes and textiles found in graves and tombs on Nabatean territory, the clothing worn by the Nabateans during the 1st and 2nd century were not unlike their neighbouring Judaeans'. It is unknown what the Nabateans wore in more ancient times since their art before this period was non-figurative. Among the most common colours were yellow made from saffron and a bright red produced from madder. Blue textiles were also found.

Nabatean men wore a tunic and a mantle both made of wool. The tunic was a Roman style (sleeveless) and with the mantle cut in a Greek style. This reflects a popular style rather than an ethnic style exclusive to the Nabateans. Nabataean women wore long tunics along with scarves and mantles. These scarves were loosely woven and sported fringes at the bottom.

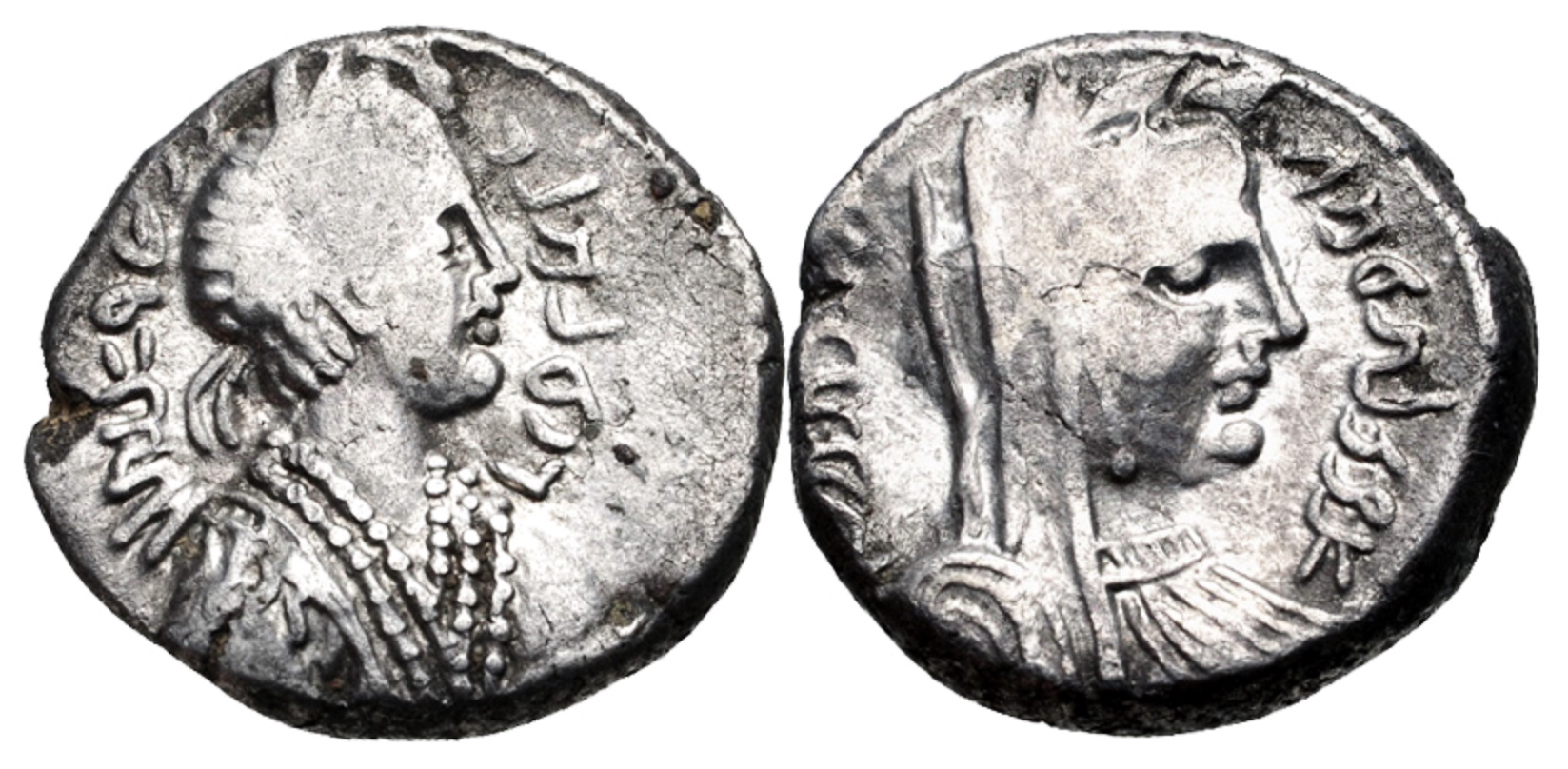
Aretas IV and Shaqilath II

The upper class of Nabataean society, from what can be seen on coins, show an even stronger Greek and Roman influence. The kings are depicted clean-shaven with long curled hair while queens are depicted wearing headcoverings with curled hair and long tunics and high-necked garments. Purple cloth seems to have been associated with the king based on Strabo's account of Nabatean men going outside "without tunics girdles about their loins, and with slippers on their feet—even the kings, though in their case the colour is purple."

== Religion ==
The major gods worshiped at Petra were notably Dushara and Al-‘Uzzá. Other gods worshipped in Nabatea during this period were Isis, Balshamin and Obodat

The extent of Nabataean trade resulted in cross-cultural influences that reached as far as the Red Sea coast of southern Arabia.

=== Main god: Dushara ===
Dushara was the supreme deity of the Nabataean Arabs and was the official god of the Nabataean Kingdom who enjoyed special royal patronage. His official position is reflected in multiple inscriptions that render him as "The god of our lord" (the king).

The name Dushara is from the Arabic "Dhu ash-Shara": which simply means "the one of Shara", a mountain range southeast of Petra also known as Mount Seir. Therefore, from a Nabataean perspective, Dhushara was probably associated with the heavens. However, one theory which connects Dushara with the forest gives a different idea of the god. The eagle was one of the symbols of Dushara. It was widely used in Hegra as a source of protection for the tombs against thievery.

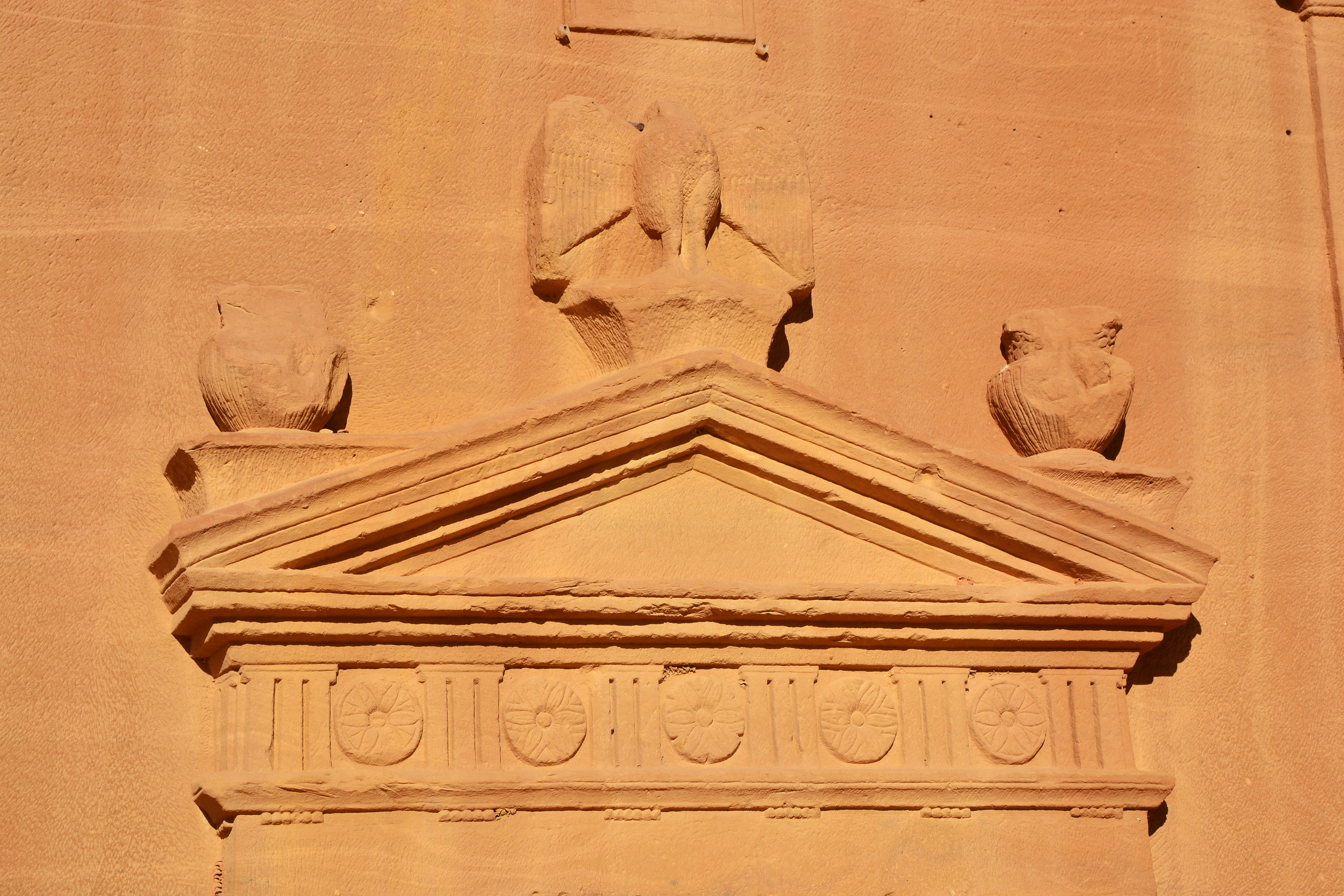
An eagle on the tomb facade that represents the guardianship of Dushara against intruders at Mada'in Saleh, Hejaz, Saudi Arabia

Nabataean inscriptions from Hegra suggest that Dushara was linked either with the sun or with Mercury with which Ruda, another Arabian god, was identified.

When the Romans annexed the Nabataean Kingdom, Dushara still had an important role despite losing his former royal privilege. The greatest testimony to the status of the god after the fall of the Nabataean Kingdom was during the 1,000th anniversary of the founding of Rome where Dushara was celebrated in Bostra by striking coins in his name, Actia Dusaria (linking the god with Augustus victory at Actium). He was venerated in his Arabian name with a Greek fashion in the reign of an Arabian emperor of Rome, Philip.

=== Female deities (al-Uzza etc.) ===
"His [Dushara's] throne" was frequently mentioned in inscriptions; certain interpretations of the text consider it as a reference for Dushara's wife, goddess Harisha. She was probably a solar deity.

Dushara's consort at Petra is considered to have been al-Uzza, and the goddess has been associated with the Temple of Winged Lions on the basis that if the divine couple of Petra was Dushara and al-Uzza and the Qasr al-Bint temple was dedicated to Dushara, then the other major temple must have been al-Uzza's. This is just a theory however, based on conjecture, and it can only be said that the temple is likely dedicated to the supreme goddess figure of the Nabateans, but the identity of this goddess is uncertain. Excavated from The Temple of the Winged Lions was the "Eye Baetyl" or "Eye-Idol".

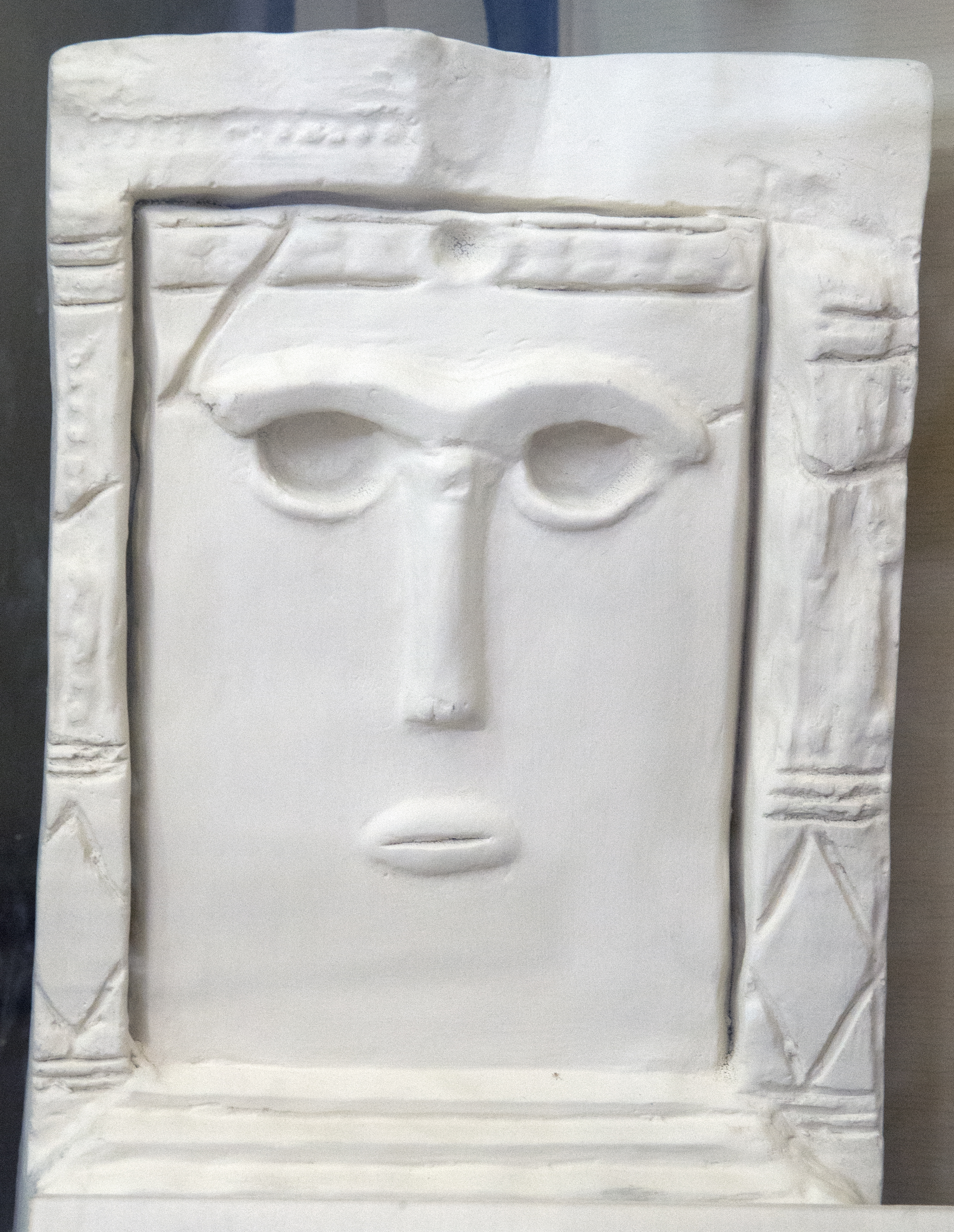
Baetyl (replica?) from the Temple of the Winged Lions, at the Jordan Archaeological Museum

Numerous Nabatean bas-relief busts of the northern Syrian goddess Atargatis were identified by Nelson Glueck at Khirbet et-Tannûr. Atargatis was amalgamated into the worship of Al-‘Uzzá.

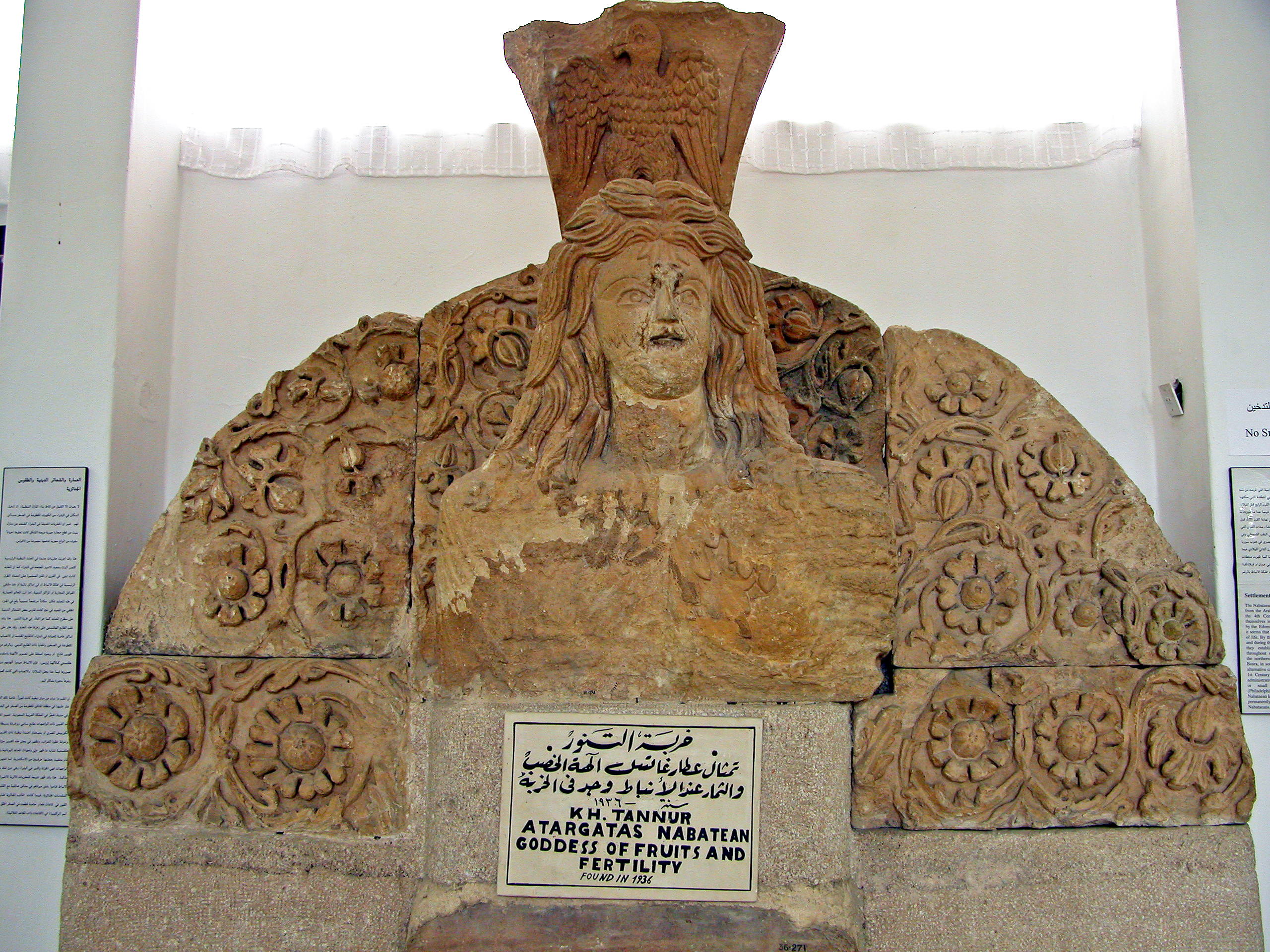
Sculpture of Atargatis from Khirbet et-Tannur

=== Worship ===
Sacrifices of animals were common, and Porphyry's De Abstenentia, written in the 3rd century, states that in Dūmah a boy was sacrificed annually and was buried underneath an altar. Some scholars have extrapolated this practice to the rest of the Nabataeans, but this view is contested due to the lack of evidence.

The Nabataeans used to represent their gods as featureless pillars or blocks. Their most common monuments to the gods, commonly known as "god blocks", involved cutting away the whole top of a hill or cliff face so as to leave only a block behind. However, over time the Nabataeans were influenced by Greece and Rome, and their gods became anthropomorphic and were represented with human features.

== Language ==
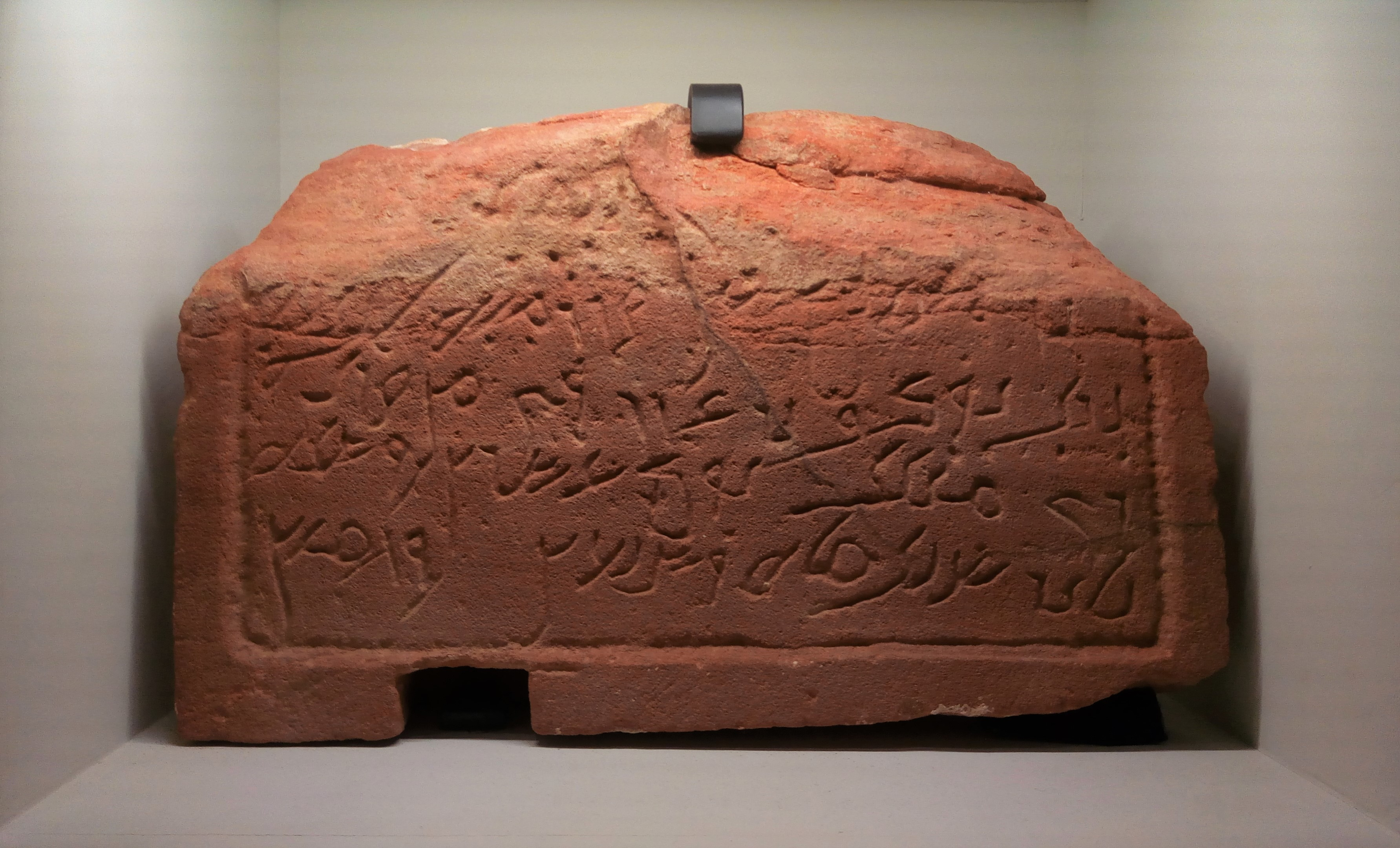
Funerary inscription in Nabataeo-Arabic characters from Al-Ula, 280 AD

Historians such as Irfan Shahîd, Warwick Ball, Robert G. Hoyland, Michael C. A. Macdonald, and others believe Nabataeans spoke Arabic as their native language. John F. Healey states "Nabataeans normally spoke a form of Arabic, while, like the Persians etc., they used Aramaic for formal purposes and especially for inscriptions." Proper names on their inscriptions suggest that they were ethnically Arabs who had come under Aramaic influence, and the Nabataeans had already some trace of Aramaic culture when they first appear in history. Some of the authors of Safaitic inscriptions identify themselves as Nabataeans.

The Nabataeans spoke an Arabic dialect but for their inscriptions used a form of Aramaic that was heavily influenced by Arabic forms and words. When communicating with other Middle Eastern peoples, they, like their neighbors, used Aramaic, the region's lingua franca. Therefore, Aramaic was used for commercial and official purposes across the Nabataean political sphere.

=== Script ===
The Nabataean alphabet developed out of the Aramaic alphabet, but it used a distinctive cursive script from which the Arabic alphabet emerged. There are different opinions concerning the development of the Arabic script. J. Starcky considers the Lakhmids' Syriac form script as a probable candidate. However, John F. Healey states "The Nabataean origin of the Arabic script is now almost universally accepted". In surviving Nabataean documents, Aramaic legal terms are followed by their equivalents in Arabic. That could suggest that the Nabataeans used Arabic in their legal proceedings but recorded them in Aramaic.

== Archeological sites ==
=== Middle East ===
==== Jordan ====
- Raqmu (Petra) and Little Petra/Siq al-Barid
- Khirbet edh-Dharih, settlement and sanctuary
- Khirbet et-Tannur, temple
- Sela (Edom), mountaintop site
- Wadi Rum, temple

==== Syria ====
- Bosra
- Salkhad (ancient Salcah)
- Seeia (Sî, Seia) in northern Hauran (ancient Auranitis): 3 temples and a necropolis; inscriptions written in what is known as Nabatean-Aramaic script and language, however the inhabitants were from the 'Ubaishat tribe, which belonged to the Safaitic-Thamudic group of tribes, not the Nabatu (Nabataeans). This situation has been encountered in several settlements of the Hauran, where inscriptions use the same language and are sometimes dated by regnal years of Nabatean kings.

==== Northwest Saudi Arabia ====
- Dumah (Dumat al-Jandal/Jawf), trade hub at southeastern end of Wadi Sirhan corridor
- Hegra (Mada'in Saleh)
- Mugha'ir Shu'ayb ("Caves of Shuayb/Jethro") aka/at al-Bad'/el-Bed' archaeological site in Tabuk Province

==== Negev Desert, Israel ====
- Incense Route – Desert Cities in the Negev:
  - Obodas (Avdat), city with Nabataean temple
  - Elusa (Haluza), town, road station
  - Mampshis (Mamshit), road station
  - Shivta, Byzantine agricultural town with contested Nabataean, Roman precursor

==== South Sinai, Egypt ====
- Dahab: excavated Nabataean trading port

=== Outside the Middle East ===
- A now submerged Nabataean temple in Puteoli (modern Pozzuoli), Italy

== Architects and stonemasons ==
=== The architect Apollodorus ===
- Apollodorus of Damascus - architect and engineer from Damascus, Roman Syria, who flourished during the 2nd century AD. Ancient scholars and historians don't mention his origins, but modern sources refer to him as either Nabataean or as Greek (see article). His massive architectural output gained him immense popularity during his time. He is one of the few architects whose name survives from antiquity, and is credited with introducing several Eastern innovations to the Roman Imperial style, such as making the dome a standard.

=== Hegra stonemasons ===
Nabataean architects and sculptors were in reality contractors, who negotiated the costs of specific tomb types and their decorations, adapting them to the financial possibilities of the customer. Tombs were therefore executed based on the desires and financial abilities of the customer (for more see below at Halaf'allahi). There were two main schools or workshops of stonemasons at Hegra and the trade was at least in some cases a family affair.

Wahb'allahi's family workshop/school

- Wahb'allahi - a first-century stonemason who worked in the city of Hegra. Wahb'allahi was the brother of the stonemason 'Abdharetat and the father of 'Abd'obodat. He is named in an inscription as the responsible stonemason on the oldest datable tomb in Hegra in the ninth year of the Nabataean king Aretas IV (1 BC/AD 1).
- 'Abd'obodat son of Wahballahi - a 1st-century stonemason who worked in the city of Hegra. He is named by inscriptions on five of the tomb facades typical of Hegra as the executing craftsman. On the basis of the inscriptions, four of the facades can be dated to the reigns of kings Aretas IV and Malichus II. 'Abd'obodat was evidently a successful craftsman. He succeeded his father Wahb'allahi and his uncle 'Abdharetat in at least one workshop in the second generation of Nabatean architects. 'Abd'obodat is considered to be the main representative of one of the two main schools of the Nabataean stonemasons, to which his father and his uncle belonged. Two more tomb facades are assigned to the school on the basis of stylistic investigations; 'Abd'obodat is probably to be regarded as the stonemason who carried out the work.

'Aftah workshop/school

- 'Aftah - a stonemason who became prominent in the beginning of the third decade of the first century. 'Aftah is attested in inscriptions on eight of the tomb facades in Hegra and one tomb as the executing stonemason. The facades are dated to the late reign of King Aretas IV. On one of the facades he worked with Halaf'allahi, on another with Wahbu and Huru. A tenth facade without an inscription was attributed to the 'Aftah sculpture school due to technical and stylistic similarities. He is the main representative of one of the two stonemason schools in the city of Hegra.
- Halaf'allahi - a first-century stonemason who worked in the city of Hegra. Halaf'allahi is named in inscriptions on two tombs there as the responsible stonemason in the reign of King Aretas IV. The first tomb, which can be dated to the year AD 26-27, was created together with the stonemason 'Aftah. He is therefore assigned to the workshop of 'Aftah. Nabataean architects and sculptors were contractors, who negotiated the costs of specific tomb types and their decorations. Tombs were therefore executed based on the desires and financial abilities of their owners. The activities of Halaf'allahi offer an excellent example of this, as he had been commissioned with the execution of a simple tomb for a person who apparently belonged to the lower middle class, but he was also in charge of completing a more sophisticated tomb for one of the local military officials.

== Gallery: architecture ==
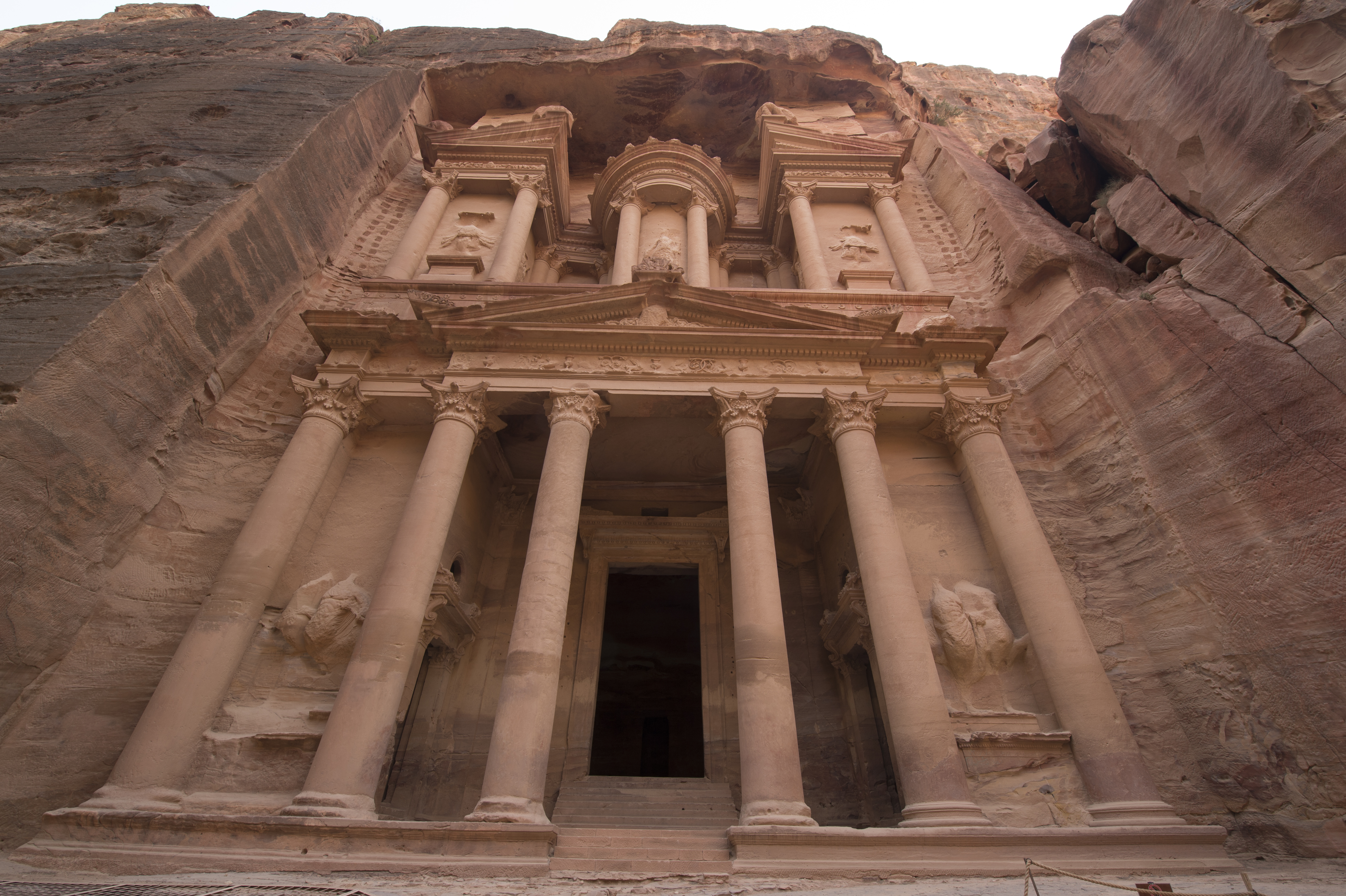
Petra, the Treasury

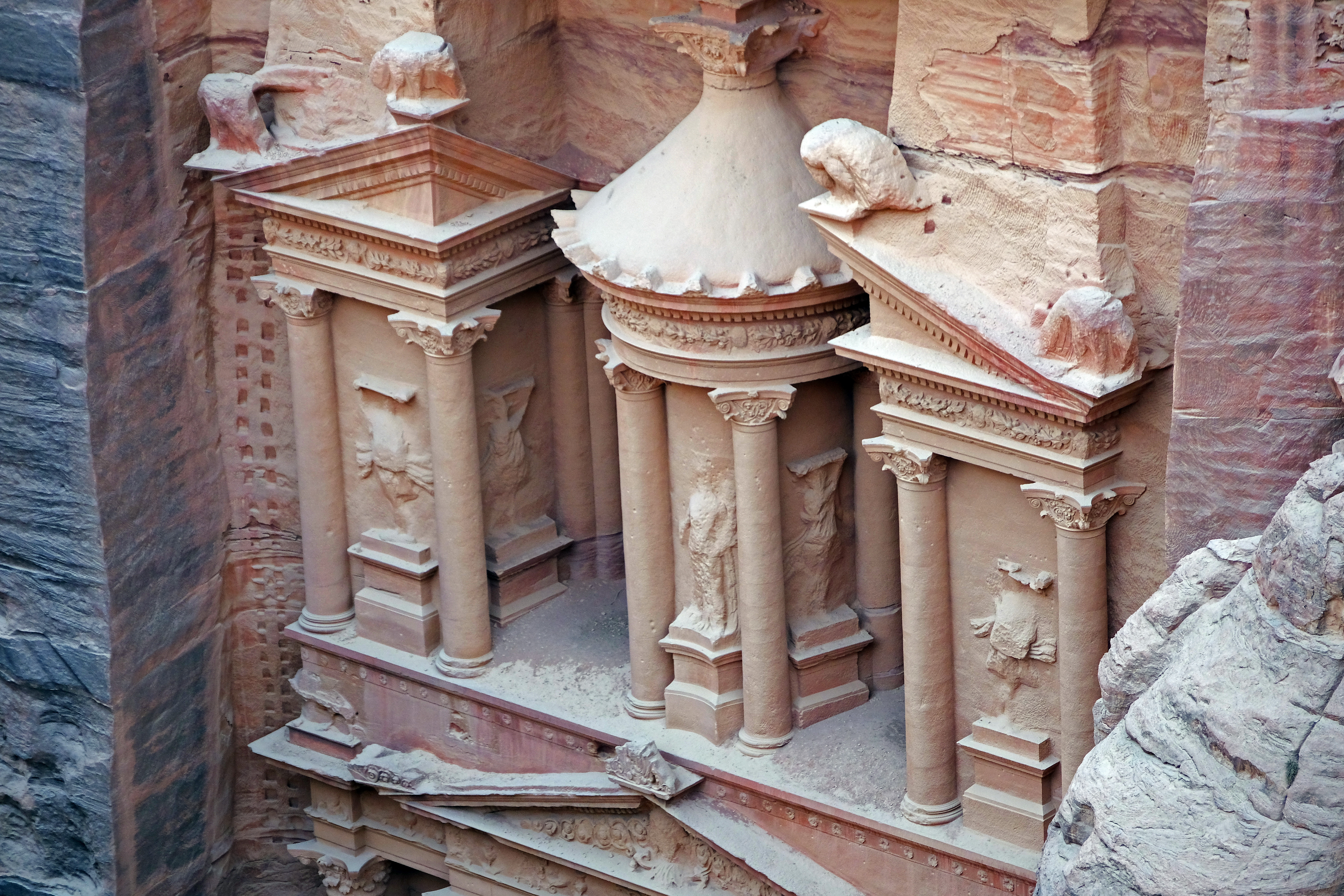
Petra, the Treasury; upper part of facade

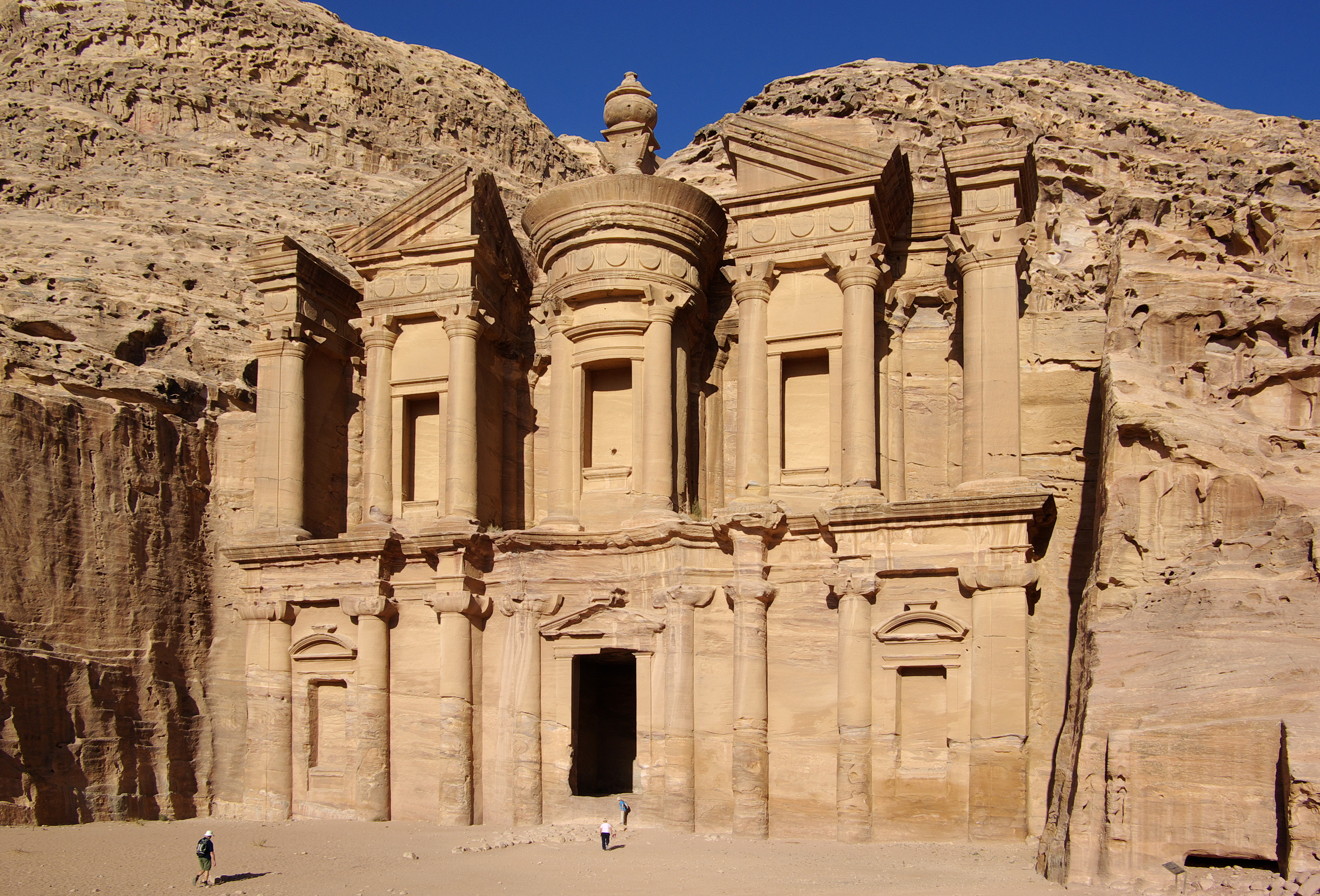
Petra, the Monastery

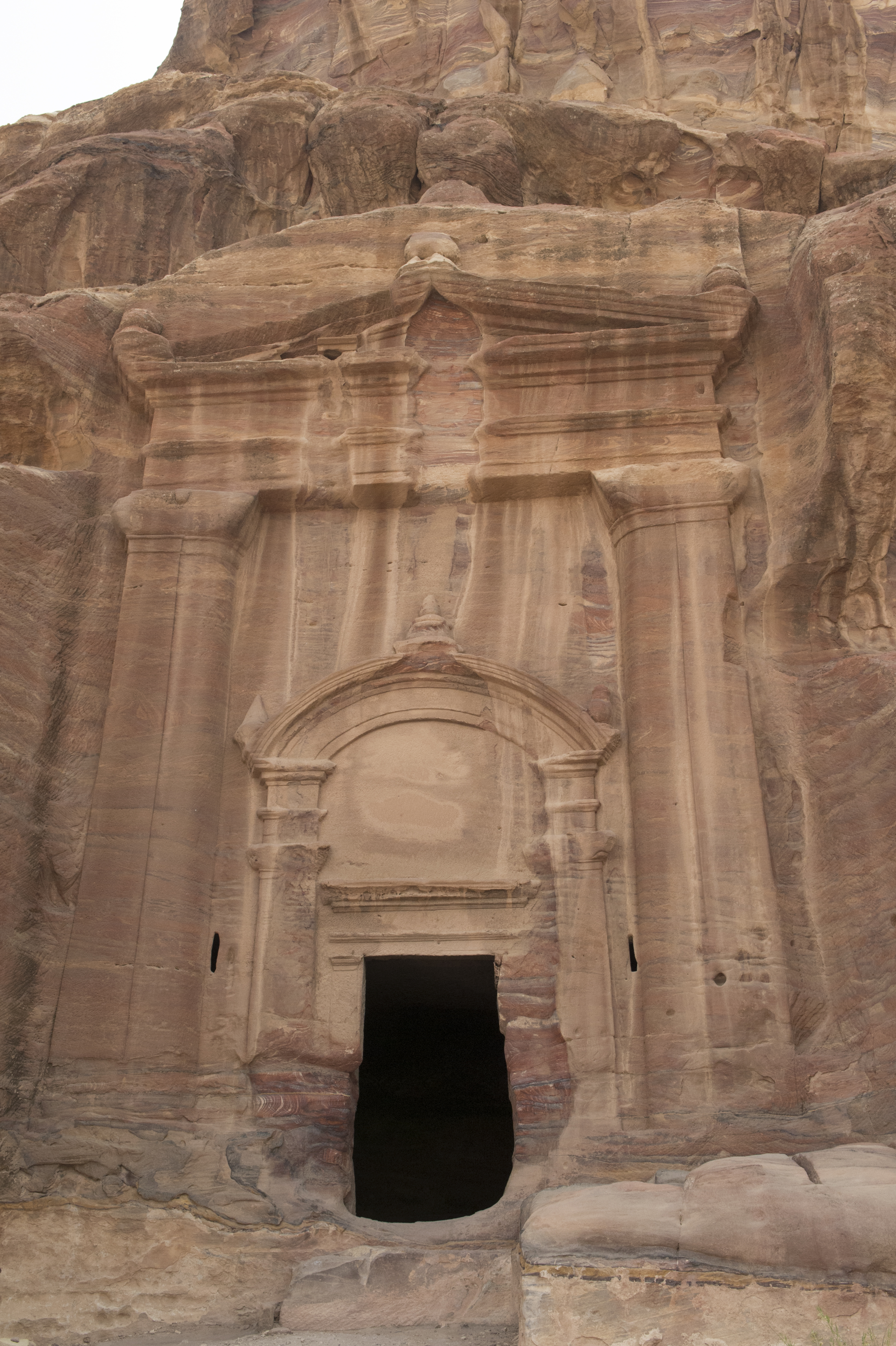
Petra, the Renaissance Tomb

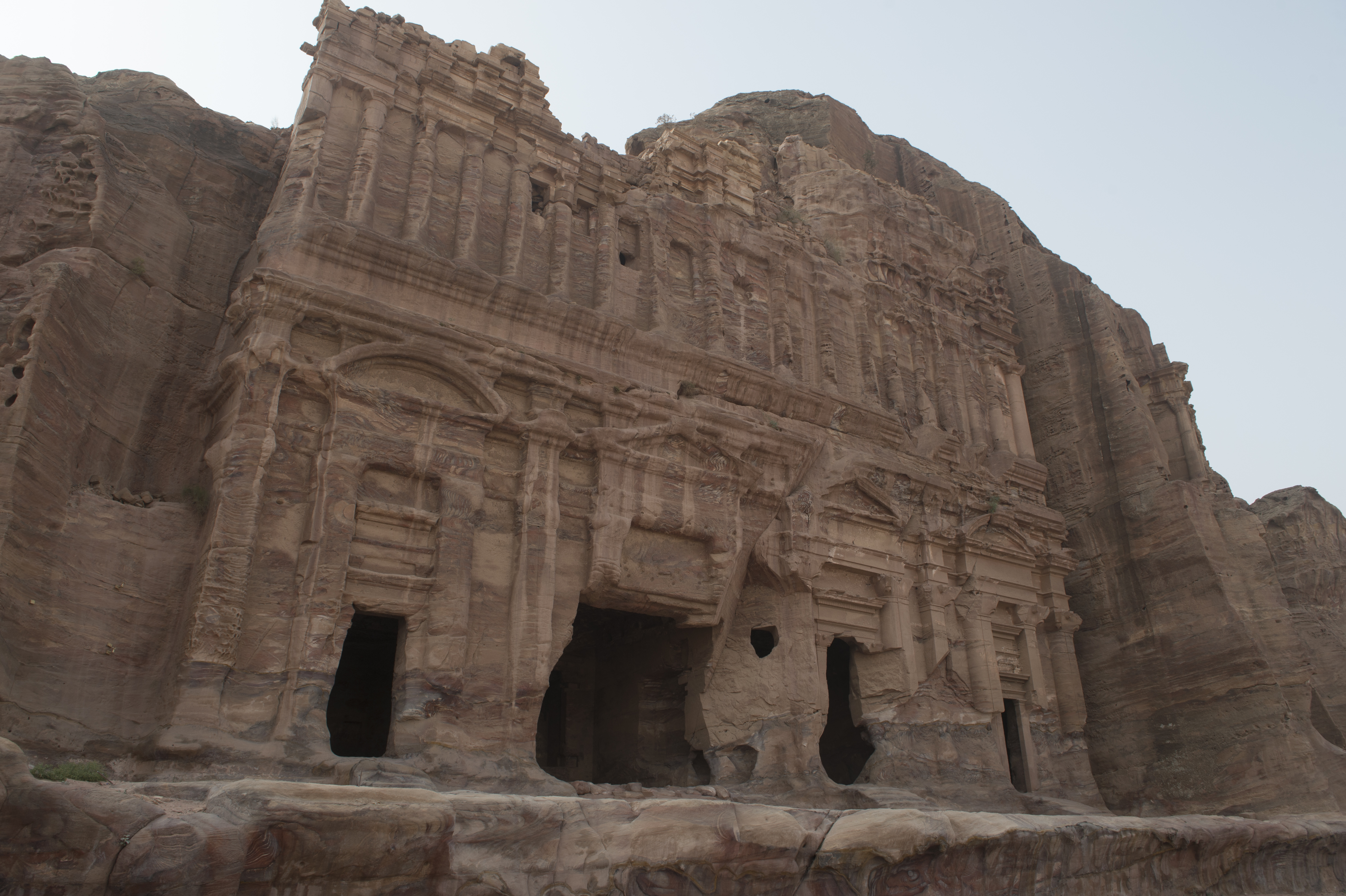
Petra, the Palace Tomb

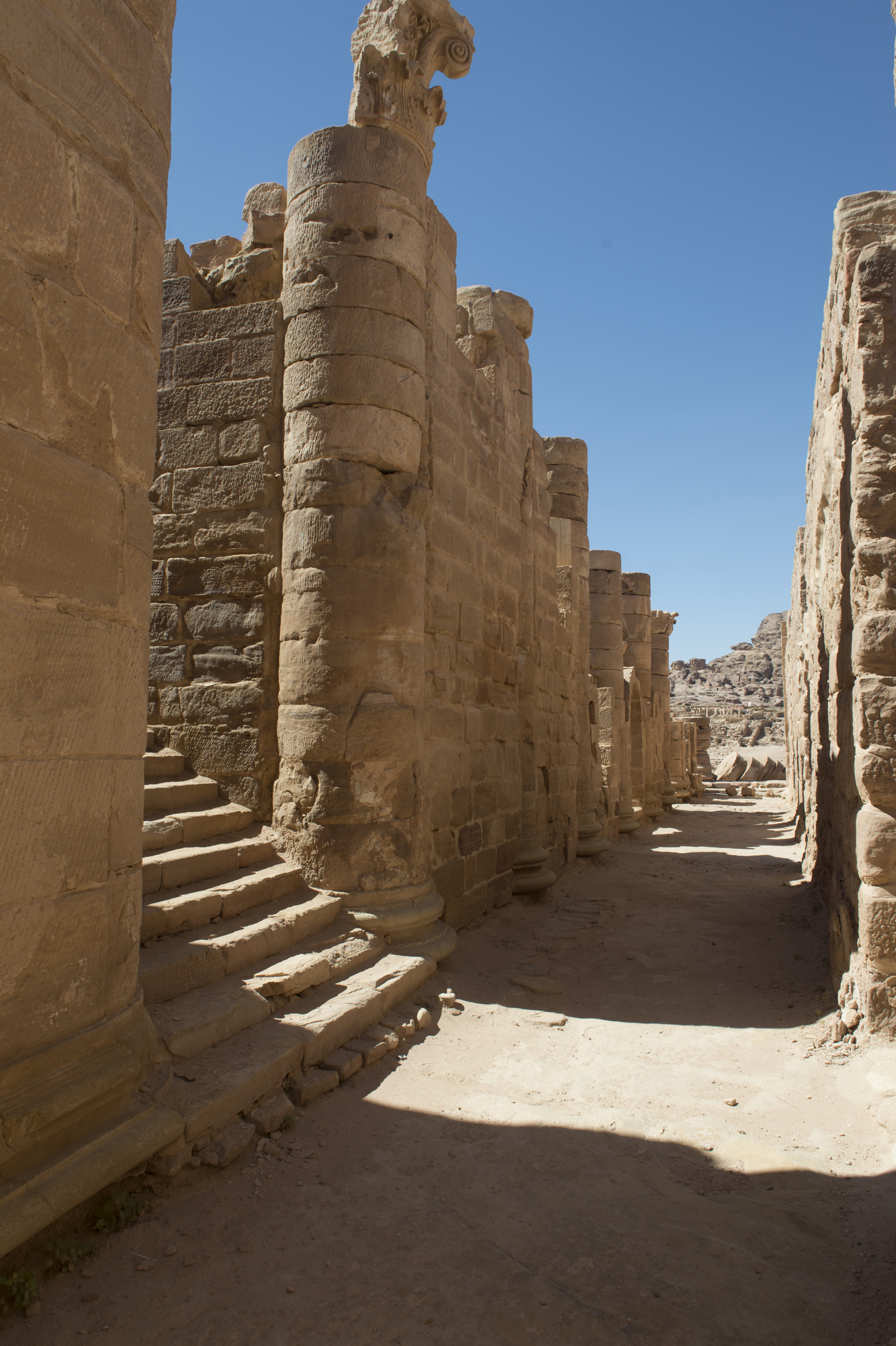
Petra, the Great Temple

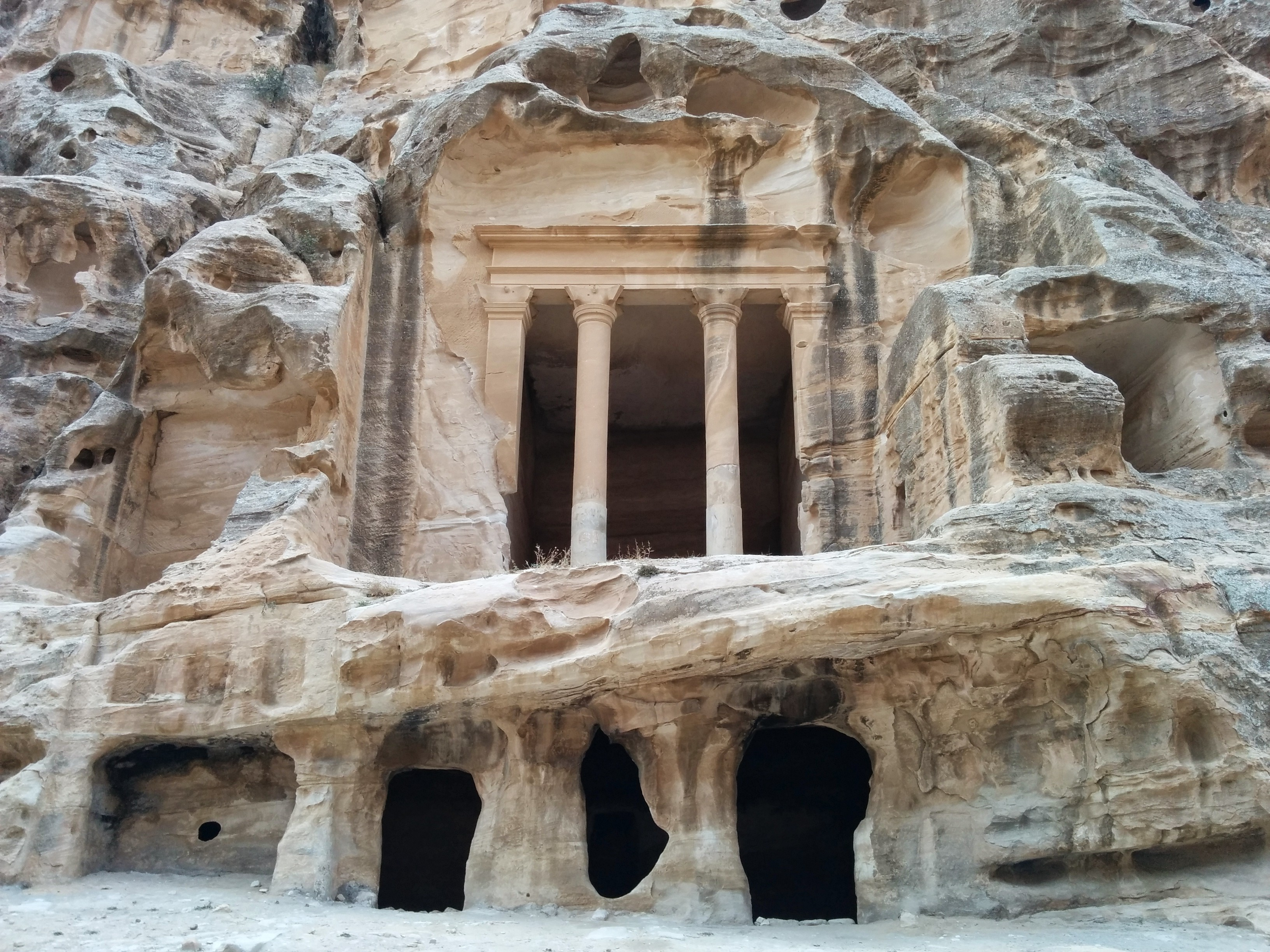
Little Petra, temple or chapel over 3-chamber rock-cut dwelling

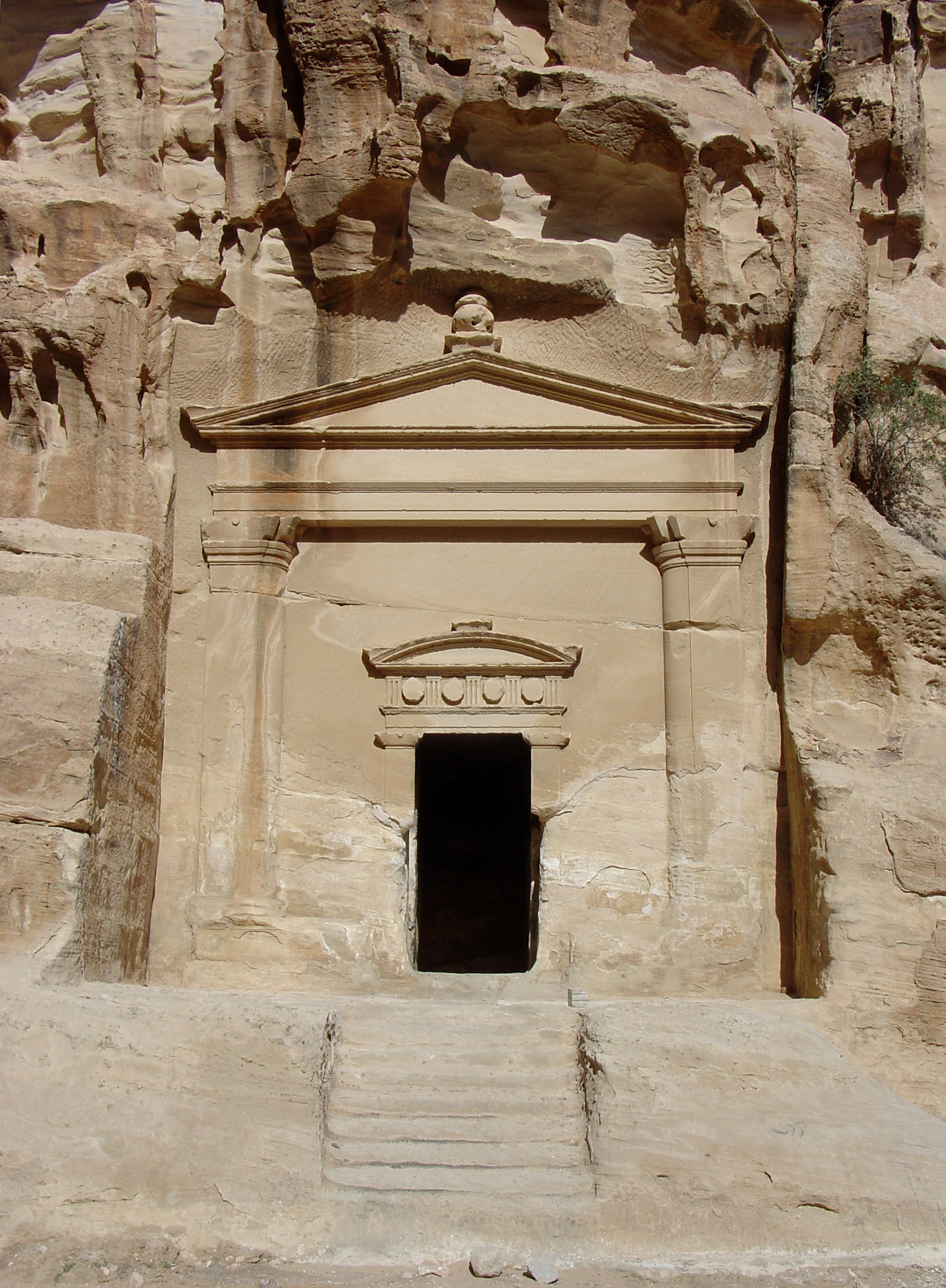
Little Petra, tomb facade 846

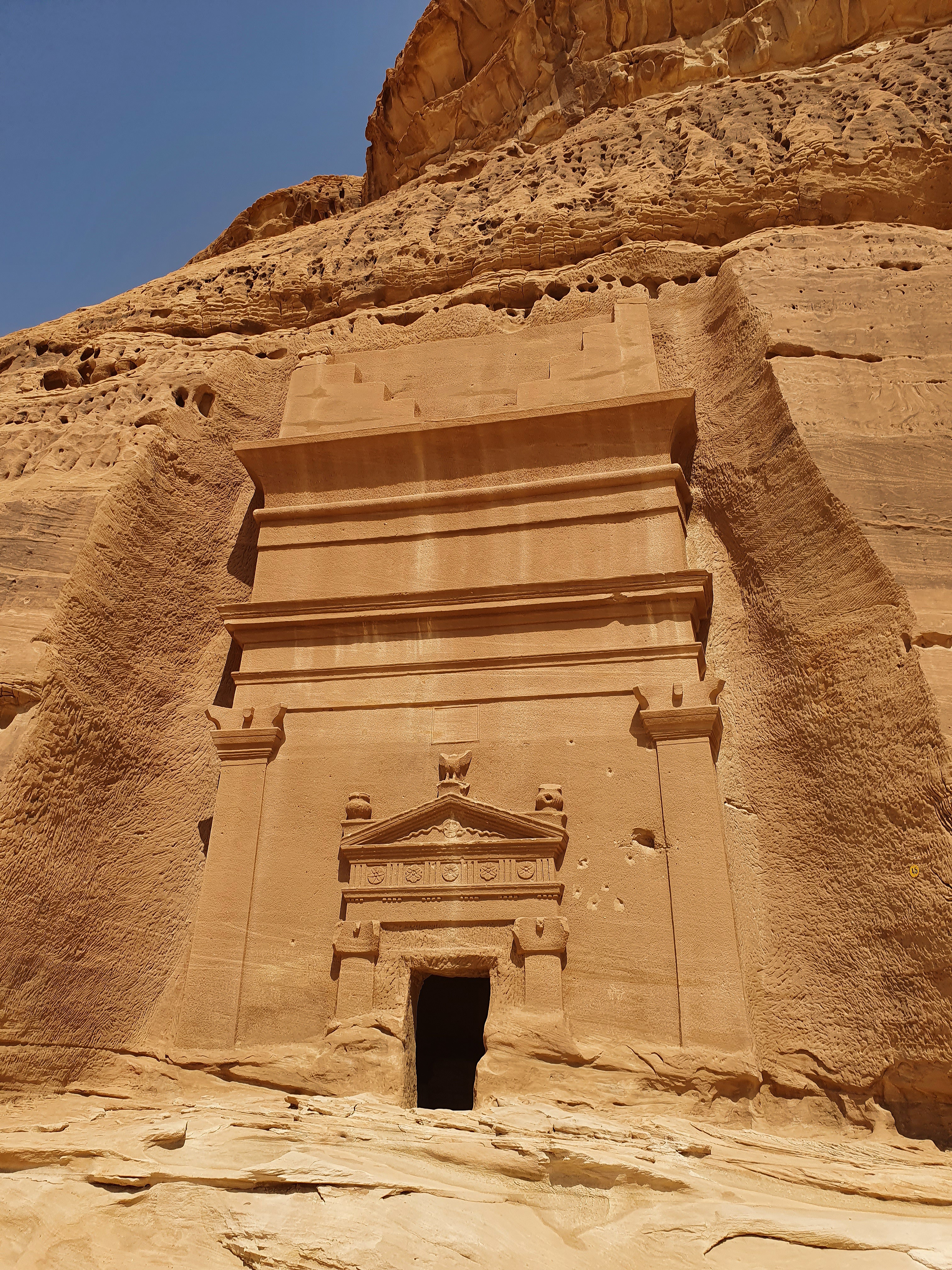
Hegra (Madain Salih), tomb in Qasr al-Bint necropolis

== See also ==
- Azd tribe
- Dushara
- Hegra (Madain Salih)
- List of Nabataean kings
- Nabataean Arabic
- Nabataean Aramaic
- Nabataean art
- Nabataean architecture
- Nabataean Kingdom
- Nabataean religion
- Nabataean script
- Petra
- Pre-Islamic Arabia
- Religion in pre-Islamic Arabia

== Bibliography ==
- Al-Jallad, A.; Macdonald M. C. A.; Nehmé L.; Fiema, Z. T. (2015). Provincia Arabia: Nabataea, the Emergence of Arabic as a Written Language, and Graeco-Arabica. In Fisher, Greg (ed.). Arabs and Empires before Islam. Oxford: Oxford Academic (Online ed.), pp. 373–433., ISBN 9780199654529
- Al-Jallad, A. (2022). In Zhi, C. (ed.). The religion and rituals of the nomads of Pre-Islamic Arabia: Reconstruction based on the Safaitic inscriptions. Ancient languages and civilizations. Vol. 1. Brill.
- Cooke, G. A.; Owen, D. I. (1903). A text-book of North-Semitic inscriptions: Moabite, Hebrew, Phoenician, Aramaic, Nabataean, Palmyrene, Jewish. Oxford, at the Clarendon Press. pp. 214–340.
- Ephʿal, Israel (1984). The Ancient Arabs: Nomads on the Borders of the Fertile Crescent, 9th-5th Centuries B.C. Jerusalem: Magnes Press, Hebrew University. ISBN 9780685742433.
- Graf, David F. (1997). Rome and the Arabian Frontier: From the Nabataeans to the Saracens. Aldershot: Ashgate. ISBN 9780860786580.
- Healey, John F. (2001). "The Religion of the Nabataeans: A Conspectus". Religions in the Graeco-Roman World. 136. Leiden: Brill. ISBN 978-90-04-10754-0. LCCN 99058629. OCLC 43185847.
- Krasnov, Boris R.; Mazor, Emanuel (2001). The Makhteshim Country: A Laboratory of Nature: Geological and Ecological Studies in the Desert Region of Israel. Sofia: Pensoft. ISBN 9789546421357.
- Lipiński, Edward (2000). The Aramaeans: Their Ancient History, Culture, Religion. Orientalia Lovaniensia analecta. Vol. 100. Leuven, Belgium: Peeters Publishers. pp. 448–450. ISBN 9789042908598.
- Bosworth, C. E.; van Donzel, E.; Heinrichs, W. P., eds. (1993). "Nabat". The Encyclopaedia of Islam. Vol. VII. Leiden: Brill. ISBN 978-90-04-09419-2. OCLC 230940304.
- Negev, Avraham (1986). Nabatean Archaeology Today. Hagop Kevorkian Series on Near Eastern Art and Civilization. New York: New York University Press. ISBN 9780814757604.
- Negev, Avraham (1988). "Understanding the Nabateans". Biblical Archaeology Review. 14 (6 (November/December 1988)): 26–29, 31–37, 39, 43–45.
- Raymond, H. A. (2008). Cultic niches in the Nabataean landscape: A study in the orientation, facade ornamentation, sanctuary organization, and function of Nabataean cultic niches. MA Thesis in Anthropology: Brigham Young University. ProQuest Dissertations & Theses.
- Schmid, Stephan G. (2001). "The Nabataeans: Travellers between Lifestyles". In MacDonald, Burton; Adams, Russell; Bienkowski, Piotr (eds.). The Archaeology of Jordan. Sheffield, England: Sheffield Academic Press. pp. 367–426. ISBN 978-1-841271361.
