= Khirbet et-Tannur =

Ancient Nabataean temple in Jordan

- خربة التنور (Arabic)
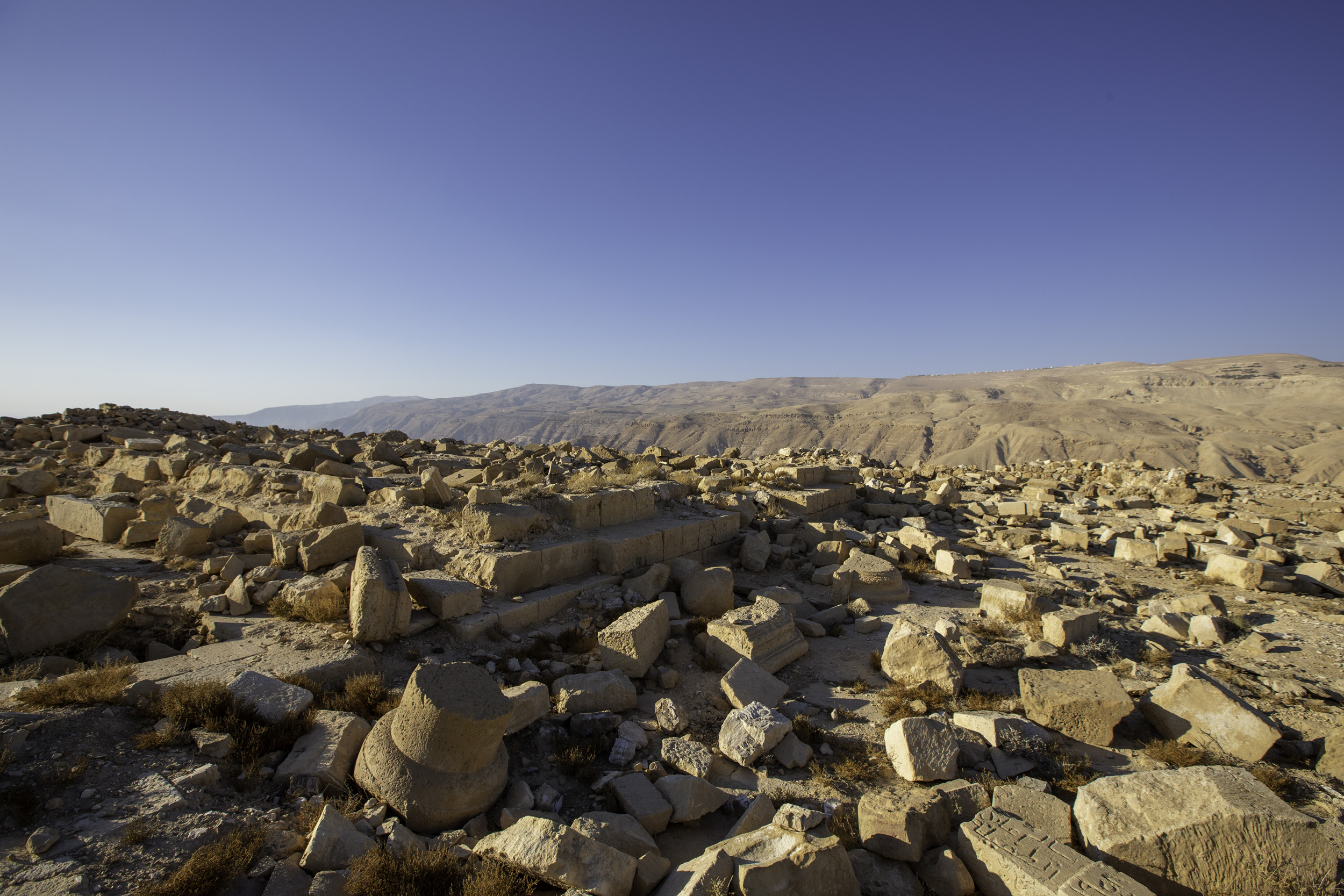
- Khirbet et-Tannur temple ruins

- Location within Jordan
- 30°58′07″N 35°42′23″E
- Cultures: Nabataean, with archaising Edomite elements
- Location: Tafilah Governorate, Jordan

Site notes
- Material: mainly limestone; also flint
- Archaeologists: Nelson Glueck (1937)
- Condition: in ruins
- Public access: yes; reliefs in Jordan Archaeological Museum in Amman and the Cincinnati Art Museum

Khirbet et-Tannur (Arabic: خربة التنور) is an ancient Nabataean temple situated on top of Mount Tannur, in today's Jordan. Whom the temple was dedicated to is not yet certain; based on the iconography of the deities depicted, it was either the fertility goddess Atargatis and Zeus-Hadad, or perhaps other Nabataean gods with similar attributes. The only inscription which mentioned a deity was in reference to the Edomite god Qos, who was the equivalent of the Arab god Quzah, the god of the sky.

While no dating is established, the temple went through three different phases. The earliest phase of the temple is usually dated around 8-7 BC on the account of an inscription engraved on a small stone block. The final phase was dated by Nelson Glueck judging from the temple's sculptures and architectural principles to about the first quarter of the second century AD.

== Etymology ==
Khirbet means ruins in Arabic, and tannur means oven. Khirbet, as well as the definite article, can be transliterated with an e or an a, and the article with an l or a t, so we can have Khirbet et-Tannur, Khirbet el-Tannur, Khirbat at-Tannur, Khirbat al-Tannur, sometimes also ...Tannour, the article can be left out, etc.

== Layout and purpose ==
The remains of Khirbet et-Tannur consists only of the temple complex on an isolated mountain top, which indicate a site solely functioning as a religious high place similar to those in other Nabataean regions.

A steep path approaching from the south-east along the ridge was the only accessway. The temple was surrounded by walls enclosing a paved court or temenos, which contained a structure, called by the researchers "the Inner Temenos Enclosure" (ITE), set behind its own walls, where the monumental altar platform stood under the open sky. The (outer) temenos was flanked by rooms.

Jebel et-Tannur or Mount Tannur rises at the confluence of two valleys, the larger Wadi Hasa and Wadi La'ban.

== Construction phases ==
While no dating is established, the temple went through three different phases. The earliest phase of the temple is usually dated around 8-7 BC on the account of an inscription engraved on a small stone block. The final phase was dated by Nelson Glueck judging from the temple's sculptures and architectural principles to about the first quarter of the second century AD.

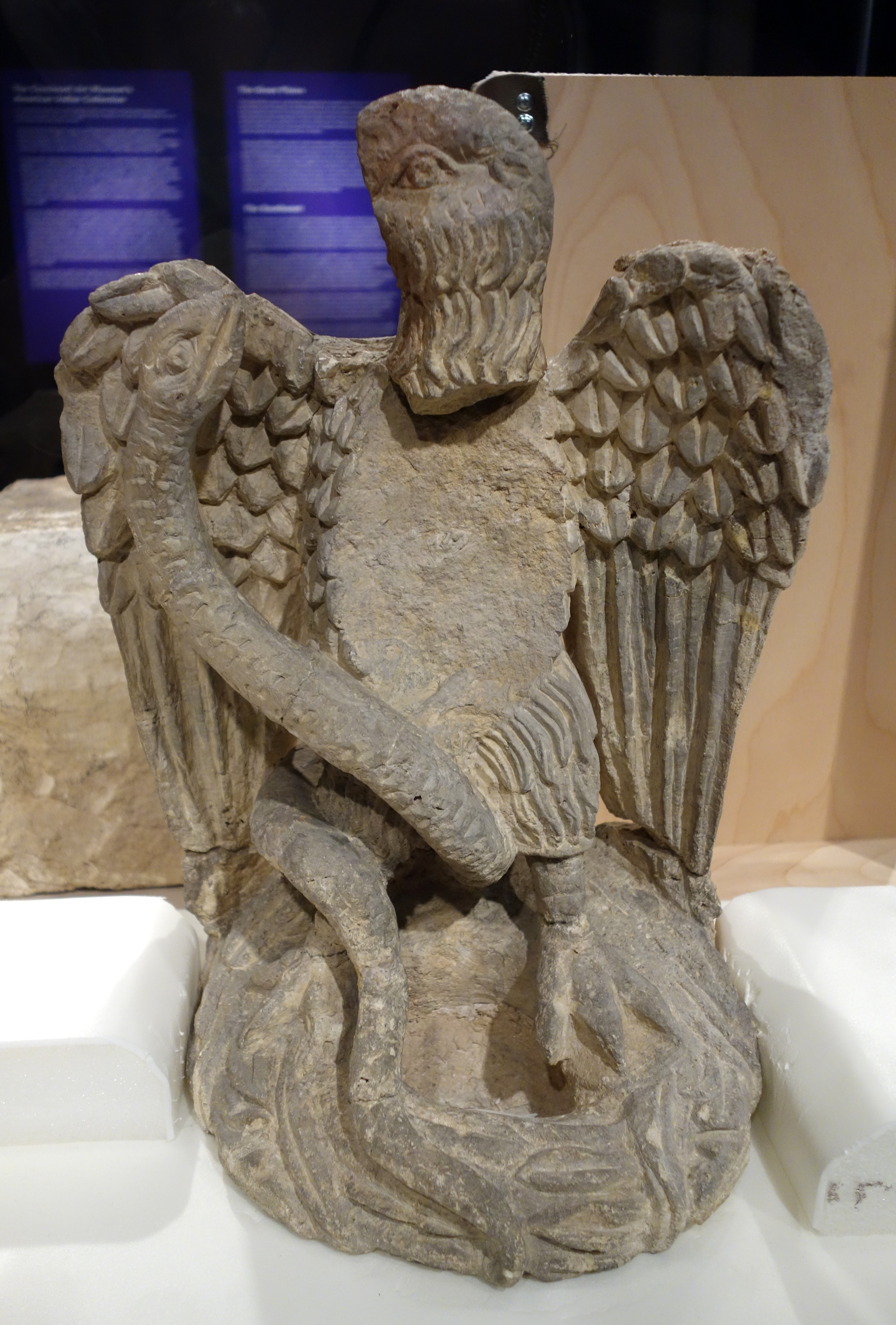
Nabataean sculpture of eagle wrestling with serpent. In J. McKenzie's reconstruction, it was placed above the female deity relief (see photo here below)

== Rituals ==
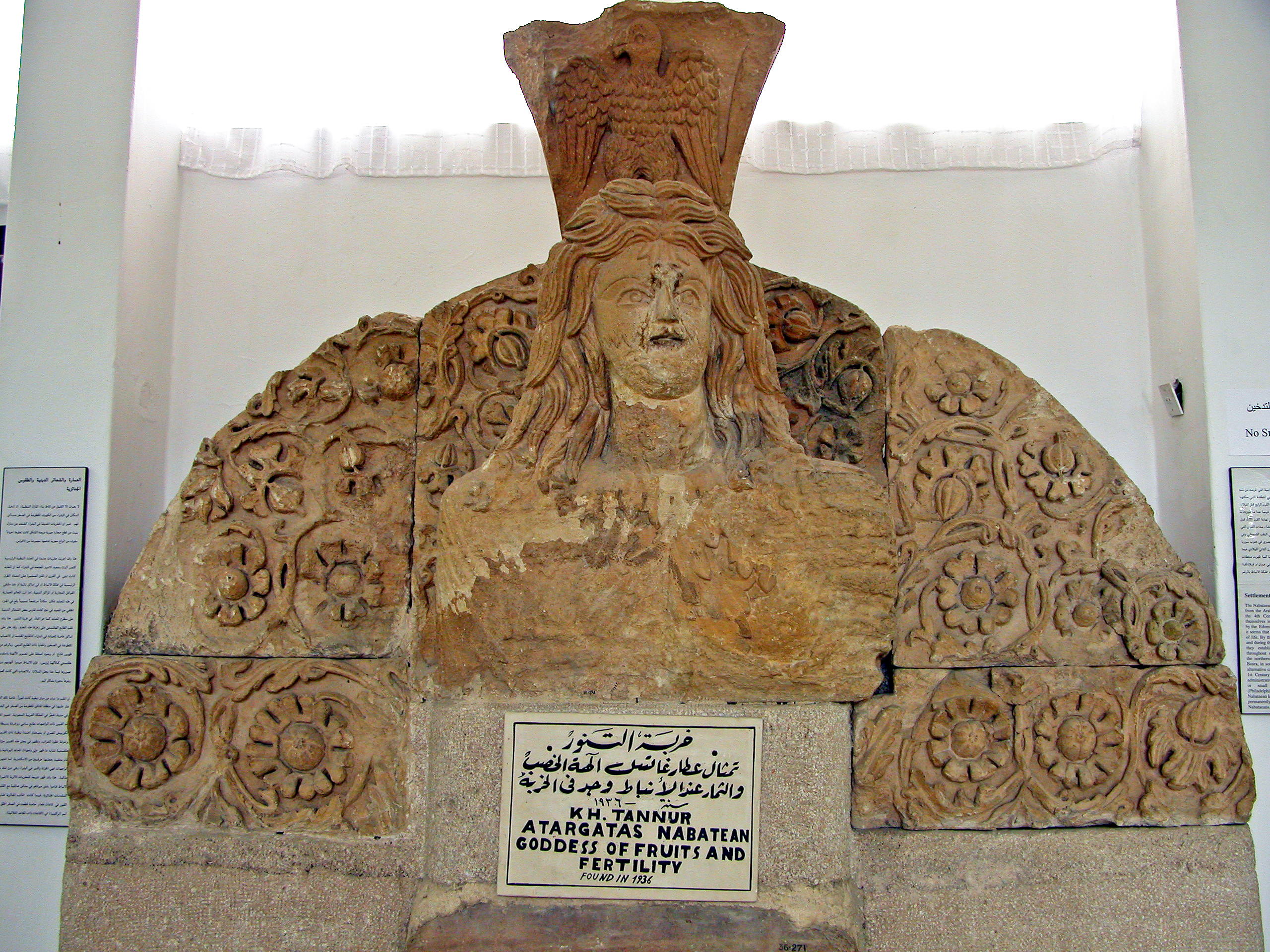
Nabataean depiction of either Atargatis or, according to R. Wenning, a personification of Ayn La'ban spring; from tympanum over main entrance to the Inner Temenos Enclosure

A study of ceramics, animal bones and charred plant remains has shown social memories were created through various eating and drinking practices.

== See also ==
- Khirbet edh-Dharih, nearby Nabataean town with temple
