= Nabataean art =

Nabataean art is the art of the Nabataeans of North Arabia. They are known for finely-potted painted ceramics, which became dispersed among Greco-Roman world, as well as contributions to sculpture and Nabataean architecture. Nabataean art is most well known for the archaeological sites in Petra, specifically monuments such as Al Khazneh and Ad Deir.

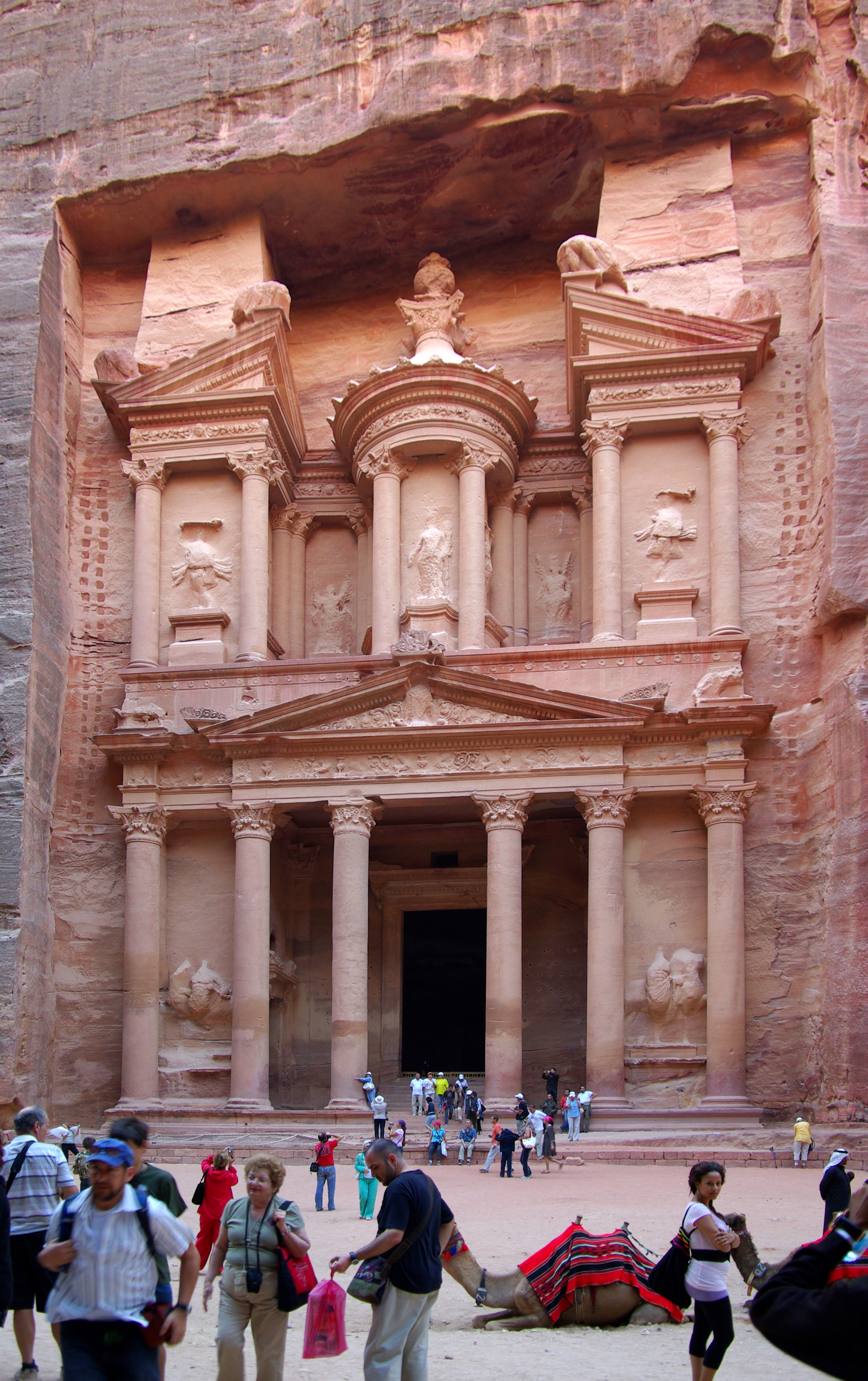
Al Khazneh or The Treasury at Petra

== Ceramics ==
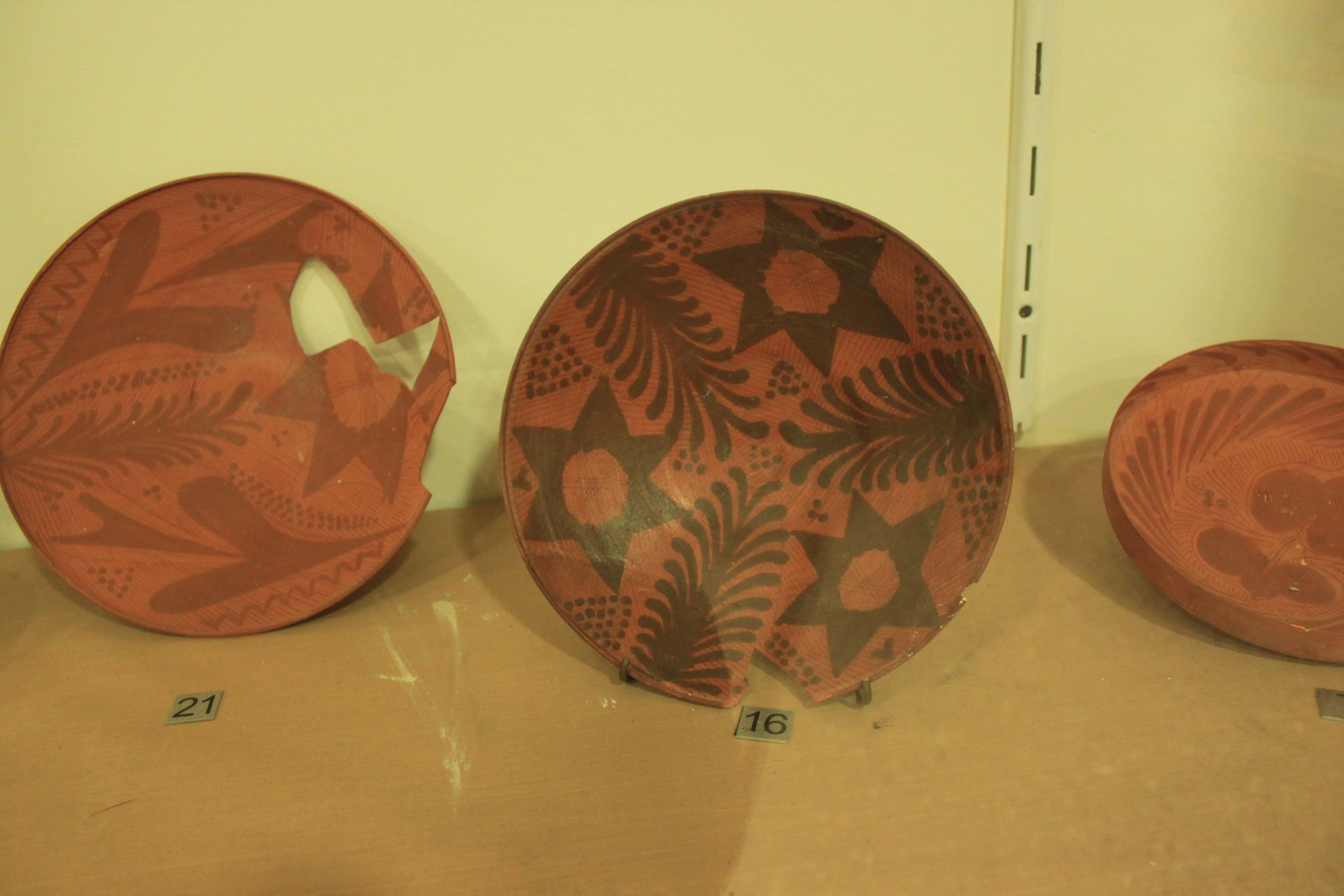
Examples of Nabataean ceramics

Nabataean pottery is characterised by its thin walls and floral motifs. The exclusive use of floral patterns links back to Nabataean aniconism in their religious practices. The designs on the wares are generally painted on or pressed into the surface with stamps and rouletting wheels. To put a finish on the pieces, the makers burnished them or used a sintering process. Most of the wares are pinkish in color, much like the cliffs surrounding the city. This is because Nabataean potters used local clay bodies in their work. Nabataean wares take many forms, and can be classified by their thickness, rim shape, bases, and decor. In some cases, the forms of the vessels mimic the shape of metal wares from the region. These vessels would have been for daily use, not ceremonial, despite the unusually large amount of broken shards found in rubbish heaps.

== Architecture ==
=== Tombs ===
Nabataean tombs are primarily "Rock-Cut tombs." They are created from cutting directly into the landscape, traditionally rock (see Rock-cut tombs in Israel). Rock-cut tombs are the most frequently found within excavated Nabataean archeological sites. There have been nearly 900 rock-cut tombs found in Petra and Hegra. Nabataean tombs are a fusion Hellenistic and Roman styles as well as a gradual creation of the Nabataean style. Some offer features of clear Greek influence, such as pediments, metope and triglyph entablatrures, and capitals. They were built to honour gods and leaders as well as house generations of a specific family. Tombs are located normally inside the city. These tombs are simple in style but elaborated in function, often featuring steps, platforms, libation holes, cisterns, water channels and sometimes banqueting halls. Many feature numerous religious icons, inscriptions, and sanctuaries found in association with springs, catchment pools, and channels.

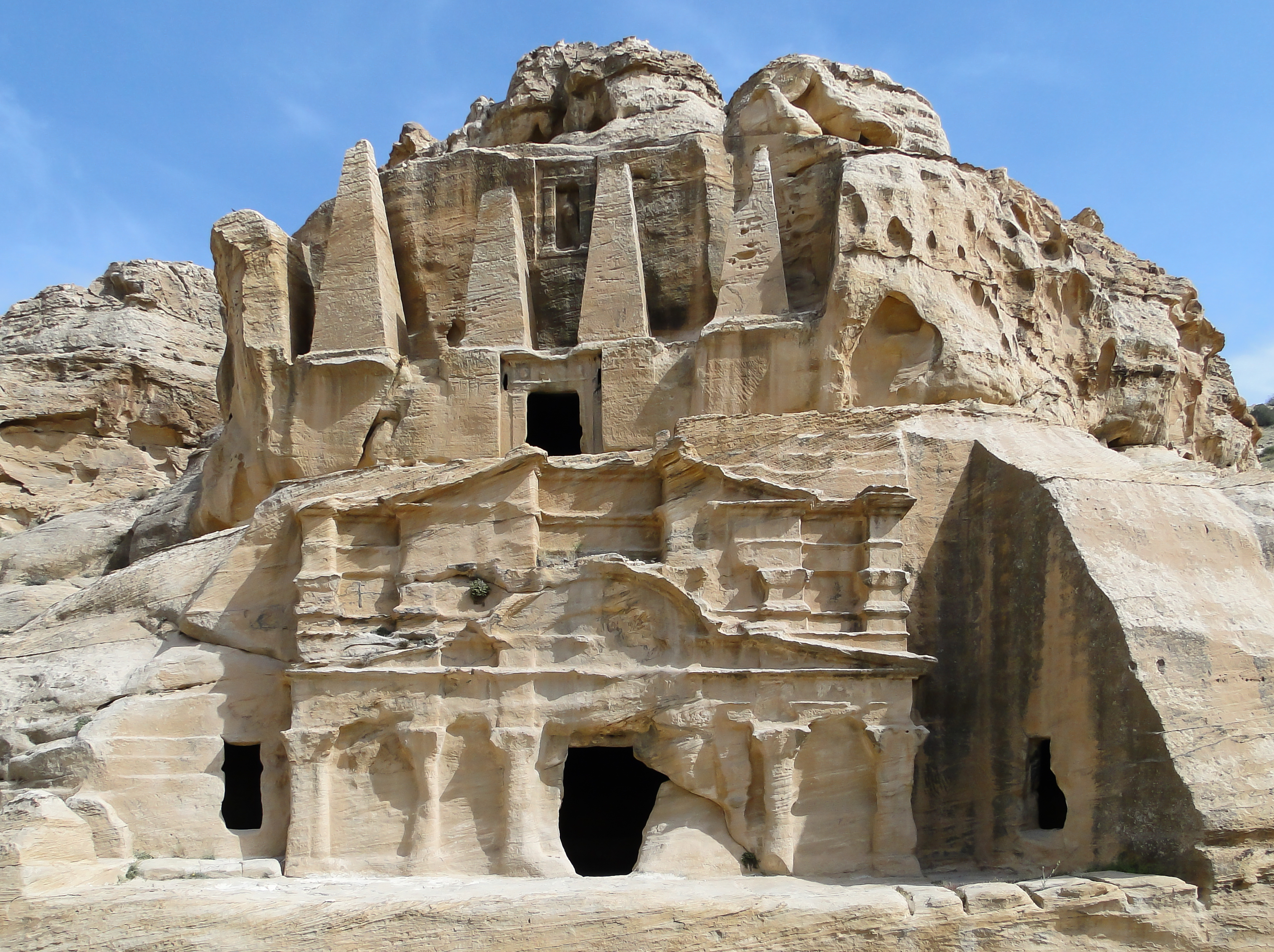
Obelisk Tomb

Crenelated tombs (see crenelation) are popular within Nabataean architecture. There are several variations of crenelation, wavering in number of tiers. Crenelated tombs were created in order to represent fortifications, creating a symbol of cities, strength, military power. Later, under Achaemenid Persians, the fortification context was removed, giving a greater scope to a sign of kingship and authority.

Several tombs feature obelisks on their exterior. Obelisks are a narrow tapering monument, often used to represent the Nephesh, specific leaders, and gods of monolithic societies. They are often found in Near Eastern and Egyptian architecture.

Tombs with detailed facades are also quite popular in the Nabataean community. There are a total of eight different façade types: Single Pylon, Double Pylon, Step, Proto-Hegr, Hegr, Arch, Simple Classical and Complex Classical. Single Pylon, Double Pylon, Step, Proto-Hegr, and Hegr are characterised by variations on the crowstep motif, combined with elements from classical architecture. Arch, Simple Classical, and Complex Classical have only classical motifs, which have been given Nabataean interpretation.

At Petra, there is a series of tombs called the "Royal Tombs." These tombs are split into four sections: the Urn Tomb, the Silk Tomb, the Corinthian Tomb, and the Palace Tomb. The Urn Tomb is built high on the mountain side, and requires climbing up a number of flights of stairs. It has been suggested that this is the tomb of Nabataean King Malchus II who died in 70 AD. Beside it is the Silk Tomb, named from its rich color of the sandstone. The Corinthian Tomb is next, featuring Greek Corinthian columns. Finally the Palace Tomb with three distinct stories in its facade.

=== Triclinia and other memorial structures ===
Feasts dedicated to the dead were held in the area of Petra in triclinia set up in man-made caves, which in special cases were part of large, elaborate complexes, such as the one in Wadi Farasa.

=== Temples ===
Among Petra's most remarkable temples are:

- The Great Temple
- Qasr al-Bint Fir'aun
- The Temple of the Winged Lions.

=== Residential structures ===
Relatively little archaeological research has been done in the residential areas of Petra. Work in Petra's az-Zantur area has indicated that there has been an evolution from non-permanent housing (tents) to built structures, with sedentarisation happening only gradually and tents coexisting with stately mansions even in later phases of evolution. Even the well-researched, stone-built and elaborately decorated Nabataean az-Zantur mansion consisted of a sumptuous representational wing, with western stucco and fresco decoration, and a simple residential wing. There were also caves used for residential purposes.

== Sculpture ==
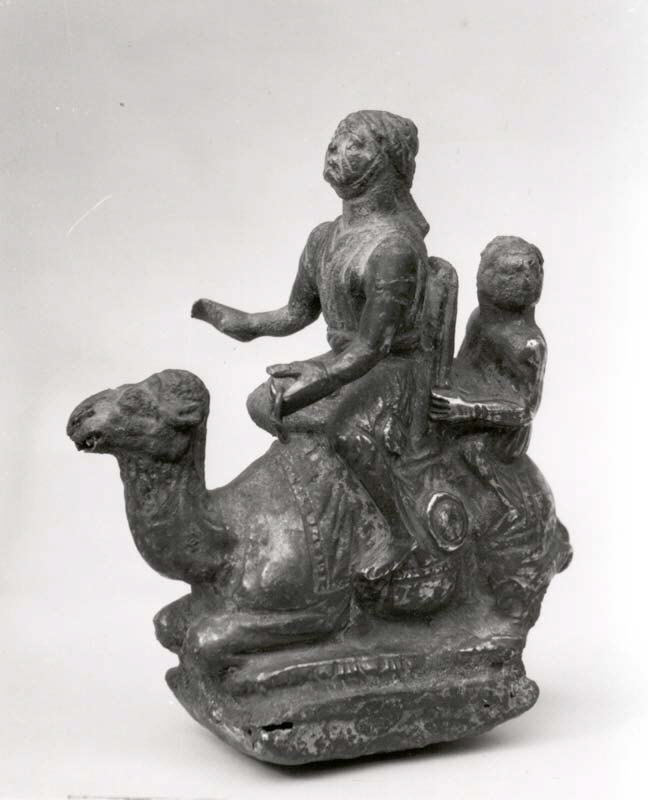
Nabataean sculpture, camel and riders. ca. 1st century BC

Early Nabataean sculpture had several characteristics of Roman, Greek, and Syrian sculpture. Wild hair, dramatic facial expressions, and S-curves mirrored the Hellenistic style of sculpture. Greek sculpture was represented with the long, tight beards, symmetry, and perfecting of the human body.

In later years, Nabataean sculpture later became very stylised. Certain elements, such as hair, were kept in the Greco-Roman style, but many other things evolved into what is now understood to be Nabataean. These characteristics are found in facial structures. The eyes of several pieces are depicted with characteristically flat, cartoonish, semicircular eyes. The same pieces often have triangular noses and large, round chins. Beyond human forms, Nabataean sculpture has come in the form of animals such as birds, elephants, and camels.

A number of different gods and goddesses are commonly represented throughout Nabataean sculpture. The majority are gods and goddesses that were worshiped by the Nabataeans; however, some are representative of Greek, Roman, and Middle Eastern beliefs. In addition, the Zodiacs are periodically represented throughout their many art forms. Dushara was a principal male deity of the Nabataeans. He has been compared to Zeus in Greek culture as well as Dionysus. Examples of Dushara have been found in several places in Petra as well as Khirbet et-Tannur. Initially and traditionally, Dushara was represented in an aniconic form such as a square block, as is represented by the baetyls of Petra, but there is a large amount of detailed sculpture found of Dushura. One specific piece shows a Hellenistic face, showing action and fleshy, vivacious characteristics. Other commonly represented Gods would include: Al-Uzza, Al-Kutbay, Nike (mythology), and the Zodiacs.

=== Baetyls ===
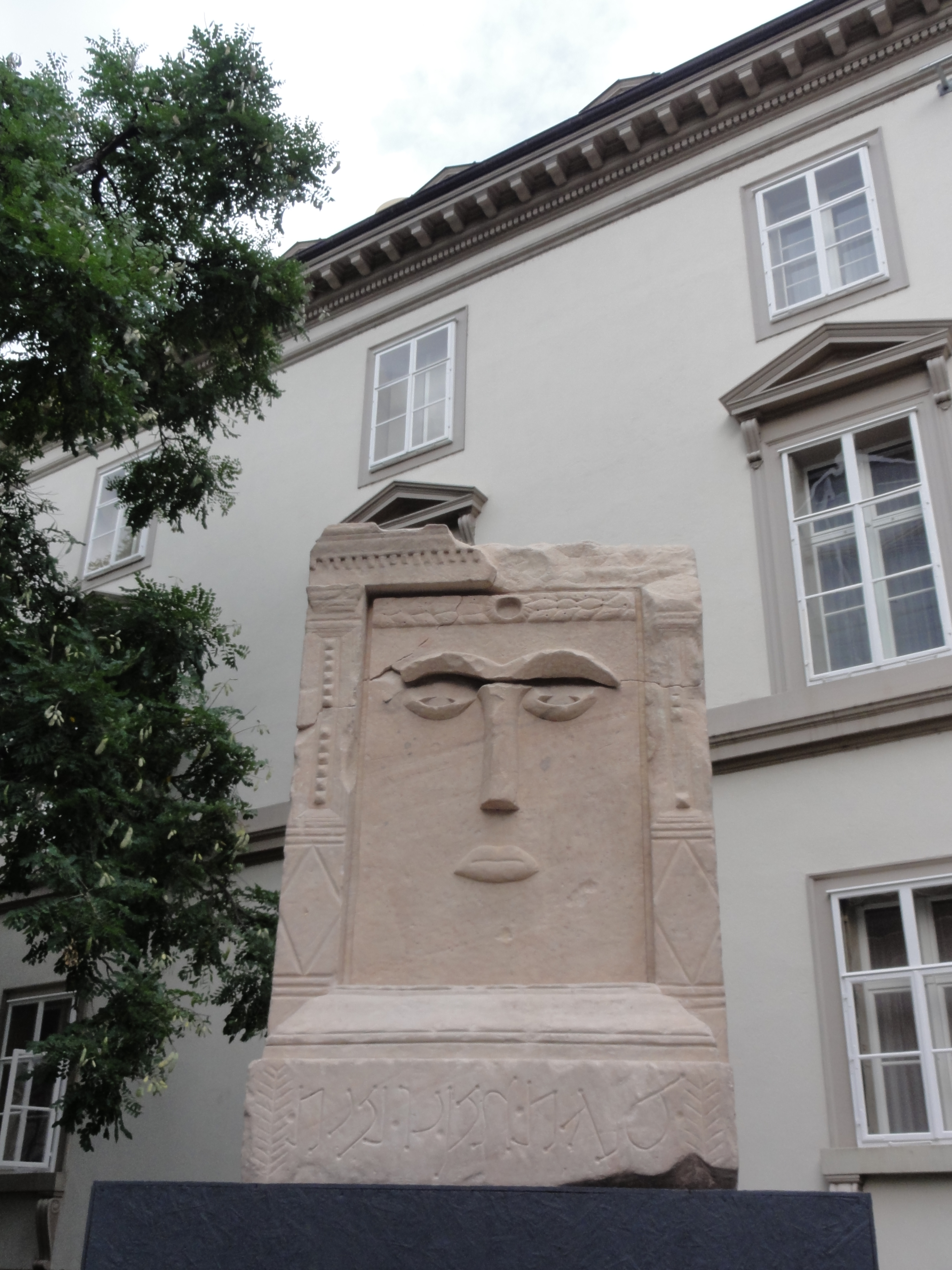
Baetyl from the Temple of Winged Lions in Petra, inscribed "Hayyan, son of Naybat" (enlarged replica, ratio 10:1)

Baetyls are another means used for the representation of gods and goddesses beyond traditional sculpture. They appear in abundance in Nabataean art. They are often carved within shrines in both public and private places. Some have pedestals or are set within niches. Baetyls were used to embody their gods, most often, although not exclusively, Dushara. They can be all sizes, in groups, or stand alone. They appear as relief sculpture and in the round. The carvings are rectangular and non-figural, though in some cases they have stylised eyes and a nose, similar to Aramic and South Arabian face stelae.

== Painting ==
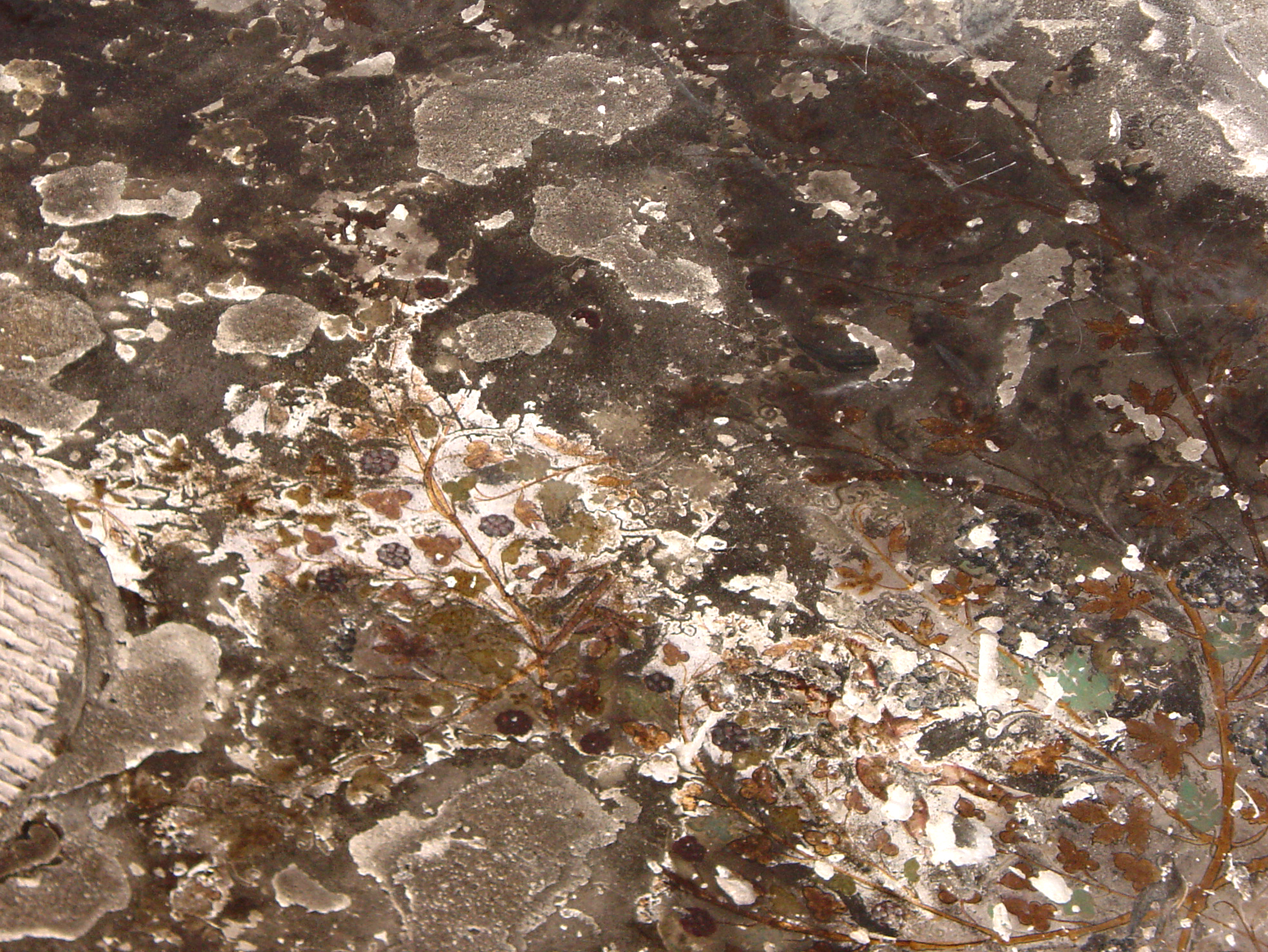
Ceiling frescoes in the Painted House at Little Petra

Few instances of Nabataean painting have survived. Most are fragments of purely decorative interior painting. There has been enough to demonstrate, however, that they follow the contemporary Hellenistic style, in which few paintings remain.

In 2010, it was revealed that a biclinium, now known colloquially as the Painted House, at Little Petra in Jordan had extensive ceiling frescoes, which had long been concealed under soot from Bedouin campfires, and other inscriptions in the ensuing centuries. A three-year restoration project had made them visible again. They depict, in extensive detail and with a variety of media, including glazes and gold leaf, imagery such as grapevines and putti associated with the Greek god Dionysus, suggesting the space may have been used for wine consumption, perhaps with visiting merchants. In addition to being the only known example of Nabataean interior figurative painting in situ, they are one of the very few examples of Hellenistic painting extant, and have been considered superior to later Roman imitations of the style at Herculaneum.
