= Betiliena gens =

Ancient Roman family

The gens Betiliena was a minor plebeian family of ancient Rome. Only a few members of this gens are mentioned in Roman writers, all from the early decades of the imperial era. Other Betilieni are known from inscriptions.

== Origin ==
The earliest inscriptions of the Betilieni are from Aletrium in Latium, where the architect Lucius Betilienus Varus was active, and Publius Betilienus Hapalus built the town wall. This was likely the town where the Betilieni originated. The nomen Betilienus belongs to a class of gentilicia formed using the derivative suffix -enus, representing -inus with stems ending in -i. Such names were usually formed from other gentilicia, but occasionally from place names.

== Praenomina ==
The chief praenomina of the Betilieni were Publius, Marcus, and Lucius, all of which were amongst the most common names throughout all periods of Roman history. Epigraphy also provides instances of Gaius and Titus, which were also very common.

== Members ==
This list includes abbreviated praenomina. For an explanation of this practice, see filiation.

- Gaius Betilienus M. f., together with his brother, Marcus, made a donation to Jupiter at Aletrium in Latium, dating between the latter half of the second century and the early first century BC.
- Marcus Betilienus M. f., together with his brother, Gaius, made a donation to Jupiter at Aletrium.
- Lucius Betilienus L. f. Varus, an architect who built an aqueduct and several public buildings at Aletrium.
- Publius Betilienus M. f. Hapalus, one of the municipal duumvirs at Aletrium, built the town wall decreed by the Roman Senate in the years following the outbreak of the Social War in 91 BC.
- Betiliena T. T. l. Philematio, the freedwoman of two men named Titus Betilienus, was buried at Casilinum in Campania, in a tomb dating from the latter half of the first century BC.
- Betilienus Antiochus, built a shrine at Rome, dating between the late first century BC and the middle of the first century AD, on behalf of the freedman Lucius Caninius Libanus, to honour the latter's patrons and former masters, Lucius Caninius and his wife. Antiochus is also mentioned on a sepulchral inscription from Rome, dating between the reign of Augustus and the end of the first century.
- Publius Betilienus Bassus, triumvir monetalis during the reign of Augustus.
- Gaius Betilienus Sp. f. Silo, built a tomb at Mutina in Cisalpine Gaul, dating from the Augustan period, for himself and his mother, the freedwoman Blaesiena Tertia.
- Marcus Betilienus Ɔ. l. Tigranes, a freedman buried at Rome, in a tomb dating from the first half of the first century.
- Publius Betilienus Carpus, inurned at Rome, along with Publius Betilienus Cures and Publius Betilienus Primigenius, in a first-century cinerarium also housing the ashes of Nucerinus, his wife, Flavia Zoë, and Pomponia Thallusa.
- Publius Betilienus Cures, inurned in a first-century cinerarium at Rome, along with Publius Betilienus Carpus, Publius Betilienus Primigenius, and others.
- Publius Betilienus Primigenius, inurned in a first-century cinerarium at Rome, along with Publius Betilienus Carpus, Publius Betilienus Cures, and others.
- Publius Betilienus Eu[...], buried in a first-century tomb at Antium in Latium.
- (Betilienus) Capito, father of the Betilienus Bassus whom Caligula had put to death in AD 40, was ordered to witness the execution, and when he asked to be permitted to close his eyes, the emperor ordered his death as well. Capito endeavoured in vain to save himself by falsely accusing others of comspiring against the emperor, but his claims grew so outlandish that they were disbelieved, though they led Caligula to imagine that he was surrounded by plotters, and thus hastened his downfall.
- Betilienus Bassus, whom Cassius Dio calls "Cassius Betillinus", perhaps the grandson of the moneyer Bassus, was a quaestor serving the emperor Caligula. He was tortured and put to death by order of the emperor in AD 40.
- Betilienus Anthus, one of the Decurions at Sora in Latium, named in an inscription dating from AD 83.
- Publius Betilienus Synegdemus, probably a freedman, built a tomb at Portus in Latium for his friend, Lucius Sittius Crescens, dating from the reign of Trajan. Synegdemus himself was later buried at Portus in a family sepulchre built by his wife, Betiliena Antiochis, who was subsequently inurned there by Marcus Cosconius Hyginus.
- Betiliena Antiochis, the wife of Publius Betilienus Synegdemus, was probably a freedwoman. She built a sepulchre at Portus for her husband and family, dating from the reign of Trajan, and was subsequently inurned there by Marcus Cosconius Hyginus.

=== Undated Betilieni ===
- Betilienus, named in an inscription from Sicily.
- Marcus Betilienus, the owner of a pottery, where slaves named Aeneas, Luc(rio?), Mar(cipor?), Metr[...], Philippus, and Ruma worked. Their makers' marks have been found on ceramics from, among other places, Brundisium in Calabria, Canusium in Apulia, Hasta in Liguria, Baeterrae in Gallia Narbonensis, Ephesus in Asia, and the sites of modern Faiyum (formerly Crocodilopolis) and Qasrawet in Egypt.
- Betiliena A[...], built a tomb at Rome for Publius Ofellius, perhaps her husband or son, and herself.
- Publius Betilienus Bassus, a potter whose maker's mark appears on ceramics from Iguvium in Umbria. He could be the same person as the Augustan era moneyer.
- Marcus Betilienus Chresimus, one of the duumvirs at Praeneste in Latium, according to pottery stamps of uncertain date.
- Publius Betilienus Chresimus, one of the duumvirs at Praeneste, and evidently the owner of a pottery, according to stamps of uncertain date, found on ceramics from Praeneste and the site of modern Valmontone in Latium.
- Lucius Betilienus L. l. Eros, a freedman named in an inscription from Ateste in Venetia and Histria.
- Publius Betilienus Liberalis, named in a bronze inscription from Rome, indicating that he was a Christian.
- Betiliena Nice, a woman inurned at Rome, aged twenty-six years, nine months, and eight days.

== See also ==
- List of Roman gentes

== Bibliography ==
- Lucius Annaeus Seneca (Seneca the Younger), De Ira (On Anger).
- Lucius Cassius Dio, Roman History.
- René Cagnat et alii, L'Année épigraphique (The Year in Epigraphy, abbreviated AE), Presses Universitaires de France (1888–present).
- George Davis Chase, "The Origin of Roman Praenomina", in Harvard Studies in Classical Philology, vol. VIII, pp. 103–184 (1897).
- Philippe Desy, Les timbres amphoriques de l'Apulia républicaine. Documents pour une histoire économique et sociale (Amphora Stamps from Republican Apulia: Documents for an Economic and Social History), Oxford (1989).
- Dictionary of Greek and Roman Biography and Mythology, William Smith, ed., Little, Brown and Company, Boston (1849).
- Joseph Hilarius Eckhel, Doctrina Numorum Veterum (The Study of Ancient Coins, 1792–1798).
- Francesco Grelle, Mario Pani, Le Epigrafi Romane di Canosa (The Roman Epigraphy of Canusium), Edipuglia, Bari (1985, 1990).
- Wilhelm Henzen, Ephemeris Epigraphica: Corporis Inscriptionum Latinarum Supplementum (Journal of Inscriptions: Supplement to the Corpus Inscriptionum Latinarum, abbreviated EE), Institute of Roman Archaeology, Rome (1872–1913).
- Theodor Mommsen et alii, Corpus Inscriptionum Latinarum (The Body of Latin Inscriptions, abbreviated CIL), Berlin-Brandenburgische Akademie der Wissenschaften (1853–present).
- Notizie degli Scavi di Antichità (News of Excavations from Antiquity, abbreviated NSA), Accademia dei Lincei (1876–present).
- Friedrich Preisigke et alii, Sammelbuch Griechischer Urkunden aus Ägypten (Collection of Greek Documents from Egypt), Karl J. Trübner, Strassburg (1915–present).
- Hilding Thylander, Inscriptions du port d'Ostie (Inscriptions from the Port of Ostia, abbreviated IPOstie), Acta Instituti Romani Regni Sueciae, Lund (1952).
