= Jebel Proywe =

Jordanian mountain

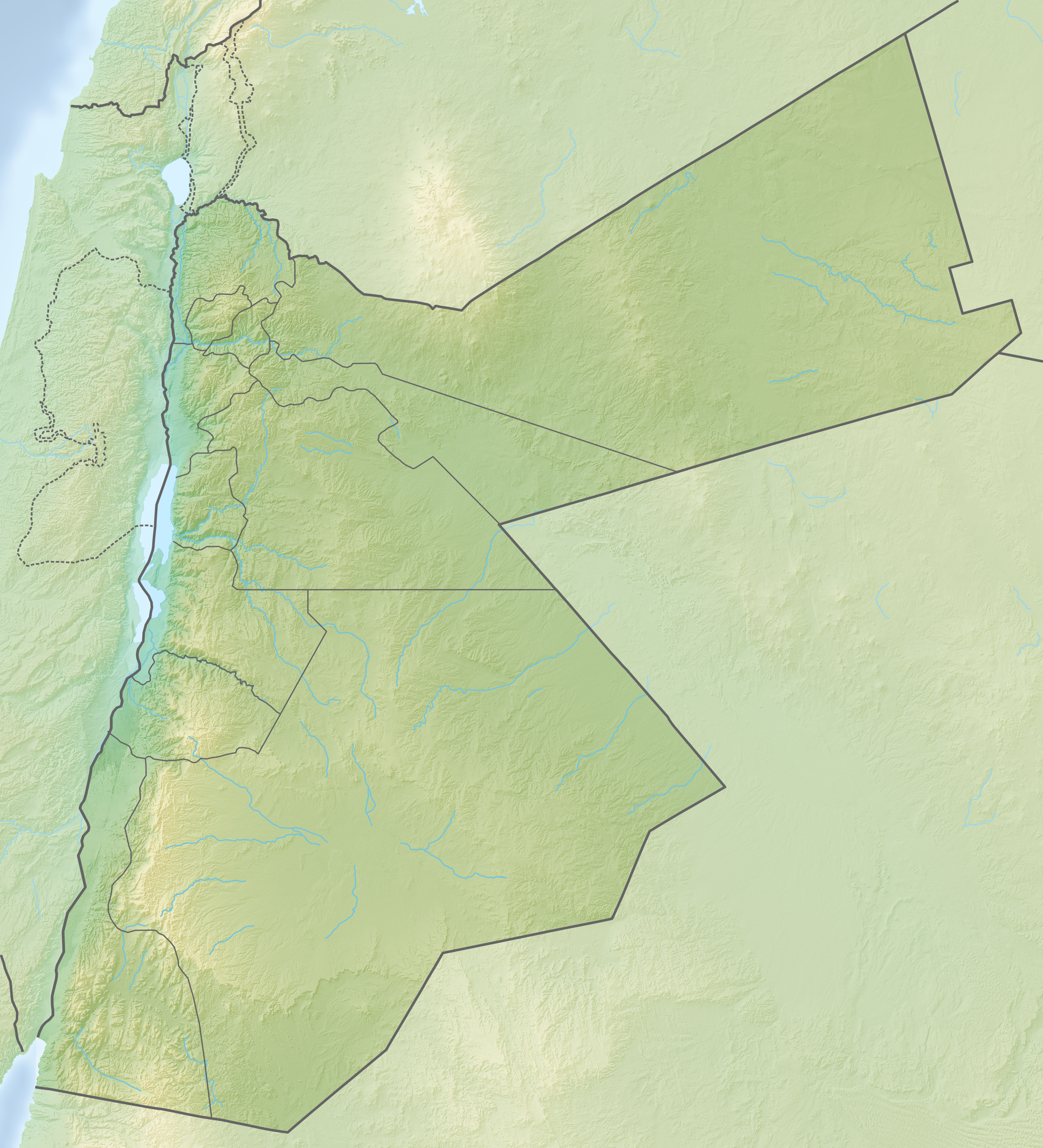
- Location within Jordan

Highest point
- Coordinates: 30°27′07″N 35°26′26″E

Jebel Proywe is a mountain in the Abarim range in Jordan. Its peak is 1,200 m (3,900 ft) above sea level. It is around 8 km (5.0 mi) north of Triclinium the ancient Nabataean ruins known also as Little Petra and 11 km (6.8 mi) south-west of Shobak.

There is a Nabatean dwelling nearby, with a living space carved from the rock face.
