= Aburom =

Aburom (Russian: Абуро́м) is an old and rare Russian male first name. Included into various, often handwritten, church calendars throughout the 17th–19th centuries, it was omitted from the official Synodal Menologium at the end of the 19th century. It may have derived from the name of Mount Abarim, where, according to some legends, Moses had died. Another possibility is that the name derives from the Serbian Muslim word meaning Roma's father.
