= Beidha (archaeological site) =

Archaeological site in Jordan

- البيضا (Arabic)
- Bayda
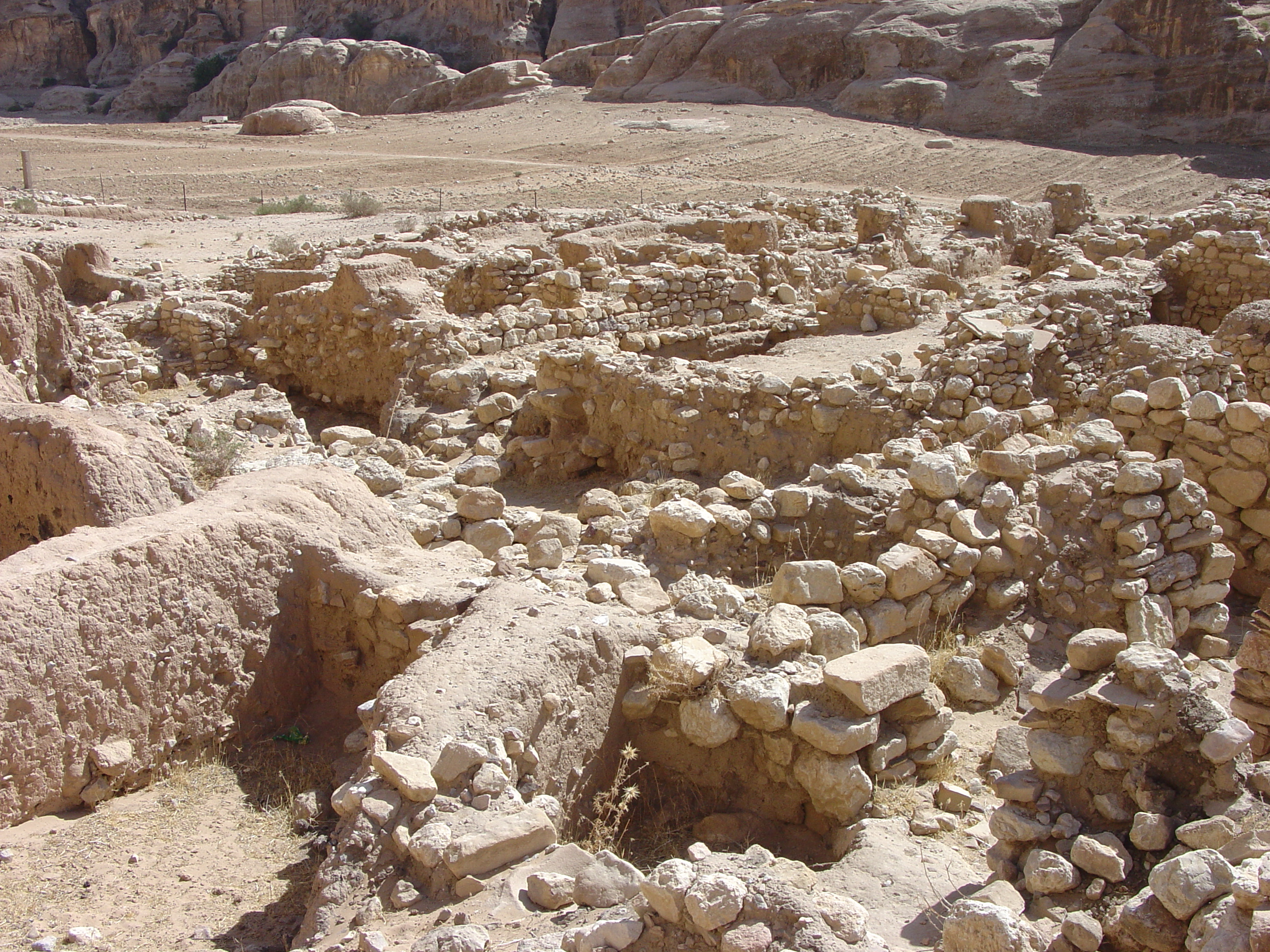

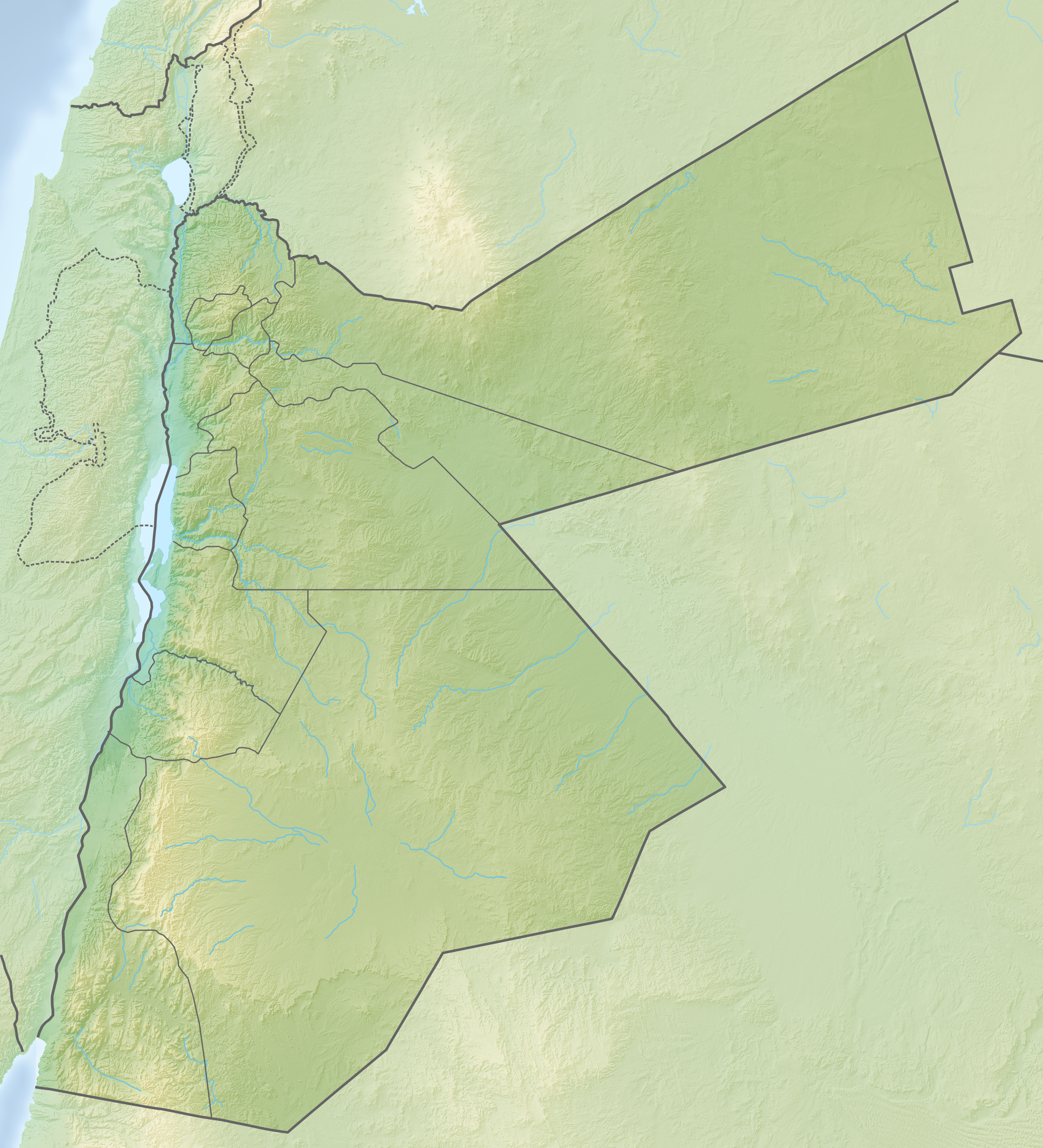
- Location within Jordan
- Interactive map of Beidha
- 30°22′15″N 35°26′52″E
- Type: Tell
- Periods: PPNB
- Cultures: Natufian, Neolithic, Nabatean
- Location: 3 kilometres (1.9 mi) north of Petra
- Region: Jordan

Site notes
- Excavation dates: 1957-1983
- Archaeologists: Diana Kirkbride, Brian Byrd
- Condition: Ruins
- Management: Petra Regional Authority
- Public access: Yes

UNESCO World Heritage Site
- Type: Cultural
- Criteria: i, iii, iv
- Designated: 1985 (9th session)
- Reference no.: 326
- Region: Arab States

Beidha (Arabic: البيضا al-baīḍā, "the white one"), also sometimes Bayda, is a major Neolithic archaeological site a few kilometres north of Petra near Siq al-Barid in Jordan. It is included in Petra's inscription as a UNESCO World Heritage Site.

== Excavation history ==
It was first excavated by Diana Kirkbride in 1957 and later by Brian Byrd.

== Periods of settlement ==
Three periods of occupation were detected: the Natufian period in the 11th millennium BC, a Pre-Pottery Neolithic B (PPNB) village with masonry construction in the 7th millennium BC and a Nabatean period dating to the 1st or 2nd century BC.

=== Natufian period ===
Natufian Beidha is characterized as a seasonal encampment, repeatedly occupied over a long period of time. Evidence from lithics recovered along with the layout and position of hearths and roasting areas suggested the occupants were primarily engaged in hunting related activities. This was supported by the absence of permanent buildings, storage, burials and large stone implements.

=== Neolithic period ===
The Neolithic stage at Beidha has been suggested to be one of the earliest villages with habitation dated between 7200 and 6500 BC. In the earliest PPNB phases, the population has been estimated at between 50 and 115 people. These villagers used stone masonry and built a wall around the settlement of round houses with subterranean floors. Its occupants cultivated barley and emmer wheat in an early state of domestication, herded goats, and hunted a variety of wild animals such as ibex and gathered wild plants, fruits and nuts. Burials were found in an area of the settlement thought to be used for ritual purposes. Evidence shows it was destroyed by fire c. 6650 BC and then rebuilt with rectangular, overground buildings and specialized workshops. At the height of habitation, the population has been estimated at anywhere between 125 and 235 people. Around 6500 BC the village was abandoned again, for unknown reasons. Many of the materials recovered came from some distance and included Anatolian obsidian and mother of pearl from the Red Sea. The transition to right-angled buildings shows an important development in human society that may have contributed the development of cities. There is also a structure dating from this period some yards east of the main site which has been interpreted as possibly being a temple for the practice of what may have been a pre-Abrahamic religion. (The layout of the structure is that of a temple, but there are no signs of any 'graven images' ever having been present.)

=== Nabataean period ===
There is also plentiful evidence of a renowned Nabataean settlement in the area including construction of a series of walls around agricultural terraces.

== Site protection and development ==
The Jordanian Department of Antiquities, Petra Development and Tourism Region Authority, USAID/Jordan Tourism Development Project and the Council for British Research in the Levant announced in 2010 a project to protect and promote Beidha. This was suggested to take up to 18 months and planned to include an interpretative presentation and new visitor facilities.

== See also ==
- List of World Heritage Sites in the Arab States
