= Publius Betilienus Bassus =

1st-century Roman moneyer

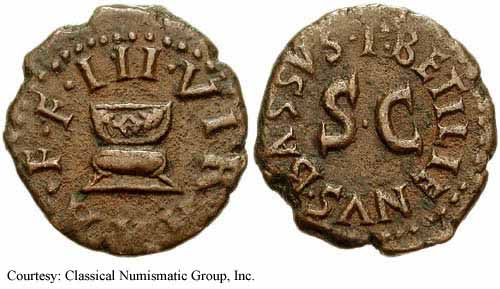
Augustan quadrans showing the mark of Betilienus Bessus on the reverse (right) side.

Publius Betilienus Bassus was a moneyer of ancient Rome who lived in the late 1st century BCE and early 1st century CE.

== Career ==
He served as triumvir monetalis during the reign of the Roman emperor Augustus, and his name occurs frequently on coins from that era. His colleagues at the mint were Gaius Naevius Capella, Gaius Rubellius Blandus, Lucius Valerius Catullus. The only denomination he appears to have minted was the quadrans.

== Identity ==
The 1st-century Stoic philosopher Seneca the Younger wrote of a Betilienus Bassus who was tortured and put to death gruesomely, "for fun", by the emperor Caligula. And the 2nd-century historian Cassius Dio wrote that a "Betillinus Cassius" was executed by Caligula in 40 CE.

It is assumed these two are the same person, and some writers have assumed both were the same as the moneyer, but this is very unlikely to have been the case, as Seneca describes Bassus as Caligula's own quaestor, and the son of his procurator Betilienus Capito, whom Caligula forced to witness his son's brutal execution. If Publius Betilienus Bassus was the person who was executed by Caligula in 40 CE, he would have to have been in his 70s at least, as we know he was minting coins for Augustus as early as 4 BCE, making it unlikely he could have a living father to witness his execution. It is possible that Publius Betilienus Bassus was the same person as Betilienus Capito, or that he was his father, and therefore the executed man's grandfather.

== See also ==
- Betiliena gens
