= Abarim =

Mountain range in Jordan

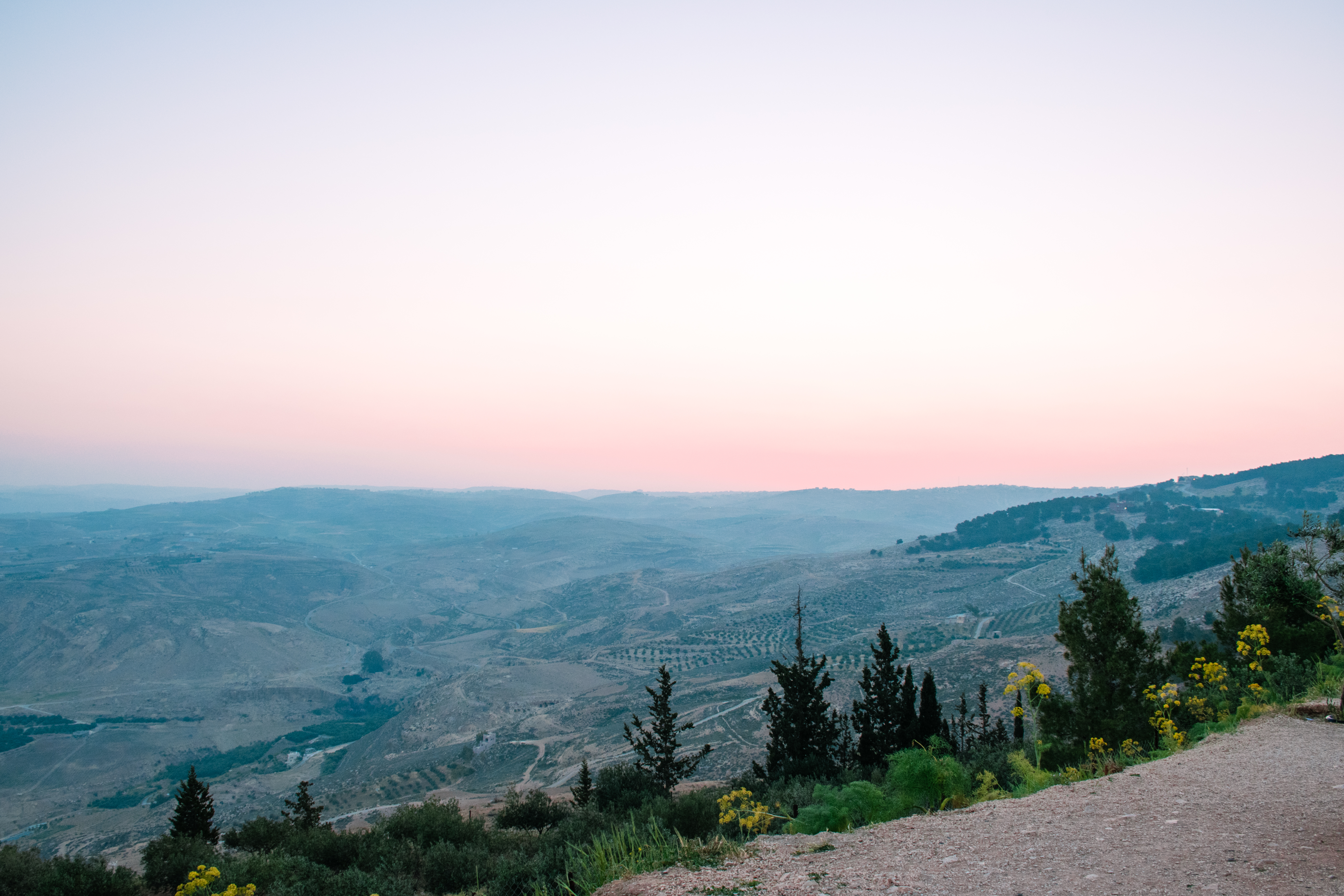
- Madaba Hills from Mount Nebo at sunrise

Highest point
- Elevation: 710 m (2,330 ft)

Naming
- Native name: הָעֲבָרִים (Hebrew)

Geography
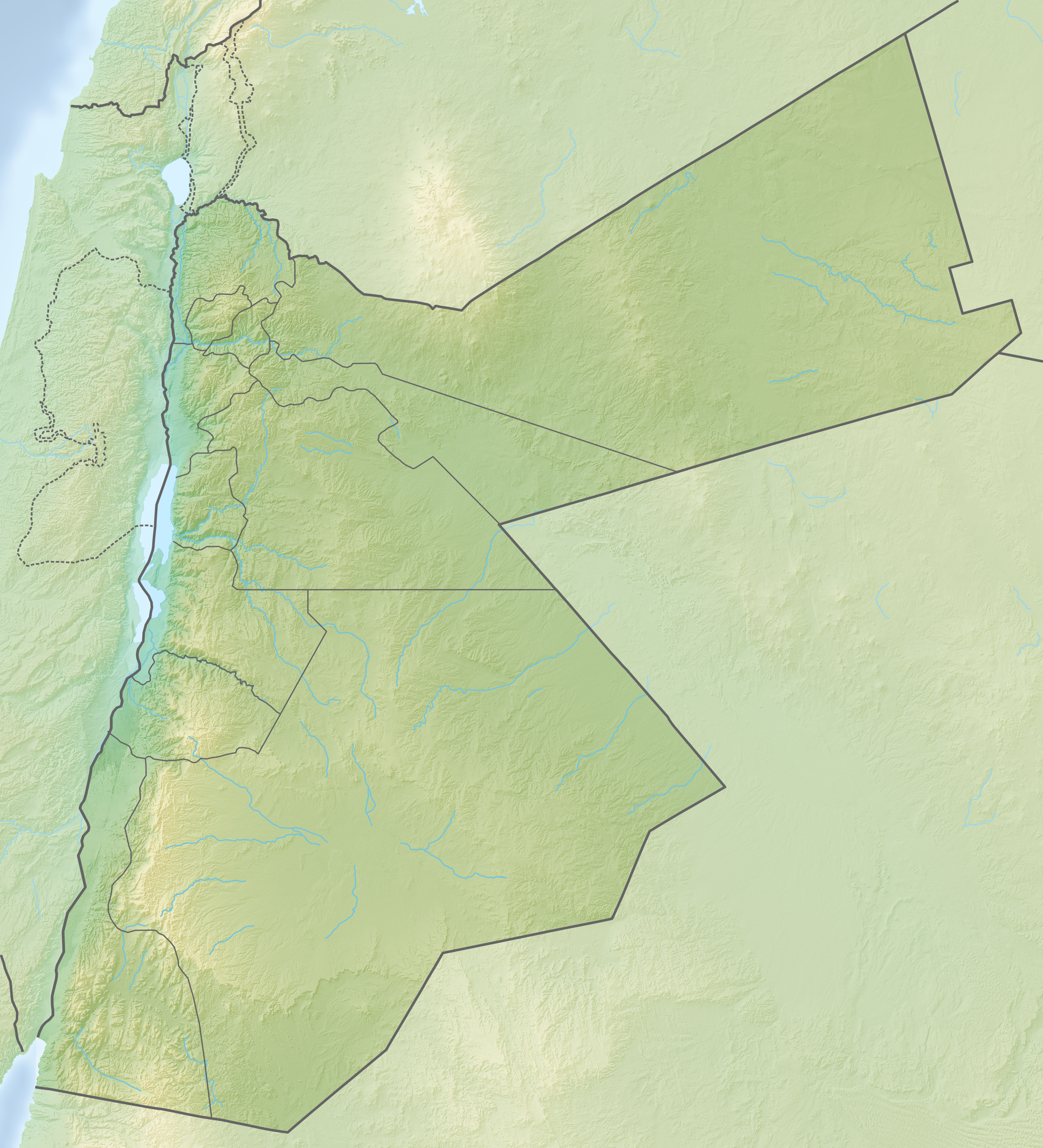
- Location within Jordan Location within Middle East Location within Asia
- Country: Jordan
- Range coordinates: 31°45′14″N 35°42′55″E

Abarim (Hebrew: הָעֲבָרִים, romanized: Hā-Avārīm) is the Hebrew name used in the Bible for a mountain range "across the Jordan", understood as east of the Jordan Rift Valley, i.e. in Transjordan, to the east and south-east of the Dead Sea, extending from Mount Nebo — its highest point — in the north, perhaps to the Arabian desert in the south.

== Etymology and description ==
According to Cheyne and Black, its Hebrew meaning is "'Those-on-the-other-side'—i.e., of the Jordan." The Vulgate (Deuteronomy 32:49) gives its etymological meaning as passages. Its northern part was called Pisgah, and the highest peak of Pisgah was Mount Nebo (Numbers 23:14; 27:12; 21:20; 32:47; Deuteronomy 3:27; 34:1; 32:49).

These mountains are mentioned several times in the Bible:

- Balaam blessed Israel the second time from the top of Mount Pisgah (Numbers 23:14)
- From "the top of Pisgah" i.e. Mount Nebo, an area which belonged to Moab, Moses surveyed the Promised Land (Numbers 27:12 and Deuteronomy 3:27; 32:49), and there he died (34:1,5)
- The Israelites had one of their encampments in the mountains of Abarim (Numbers 33:47,48) after crossing the Arnon
- The prophet Jeremiah linked it with Bashan and Lebanon as locations from which the people cried in vain to God for rescue (Jeremiah 22:20)
- Jeremiah hid the Ark of the Covenant there (II Maccabees 2:4-5). (The book of 2 Maccabees is included in Bibles used by Roman Catholics, but generally not in Protestant or Jewish Bibles.)

== See also ==
- Jordanian Highlands, the region that includes this mountain range.
- Biblical names for geographical features possibly part of "Abarim"
  - Mount Seir, the ancient name for the mountainous region between the Dead Sea and the Gulf of Aqaba; modern Jibāl ash-Sharāh
- Modern names for geographical features possibly synonymous or contained in "Abarim"
  - Al-Sharat or Ash-Sharāh, a highland region in modern-day southern Jordan and northwestern Saudi Arabia
  - Jibāl ash-Sharāh (see Mount Seir), with Petra, Jebe Harun/Mount Aaron, etc.
  - Jebel Proywe, Jordanian mountain north of Little Petra
  - Petra (ancient Reqem/Reqmu/Rakmu) in Seir
  - Jebel Harun, or southern Mount Hor near Petra, with the alleged tomb of Aaron
- Related geographical features
  - Midian Mountains, Saudi Arabian mountains to the south
