= Temple of the Winged Lions =

Temple complex located in Petra, Jordan

Coordinates: 30°19′49″N 35°26′33″E

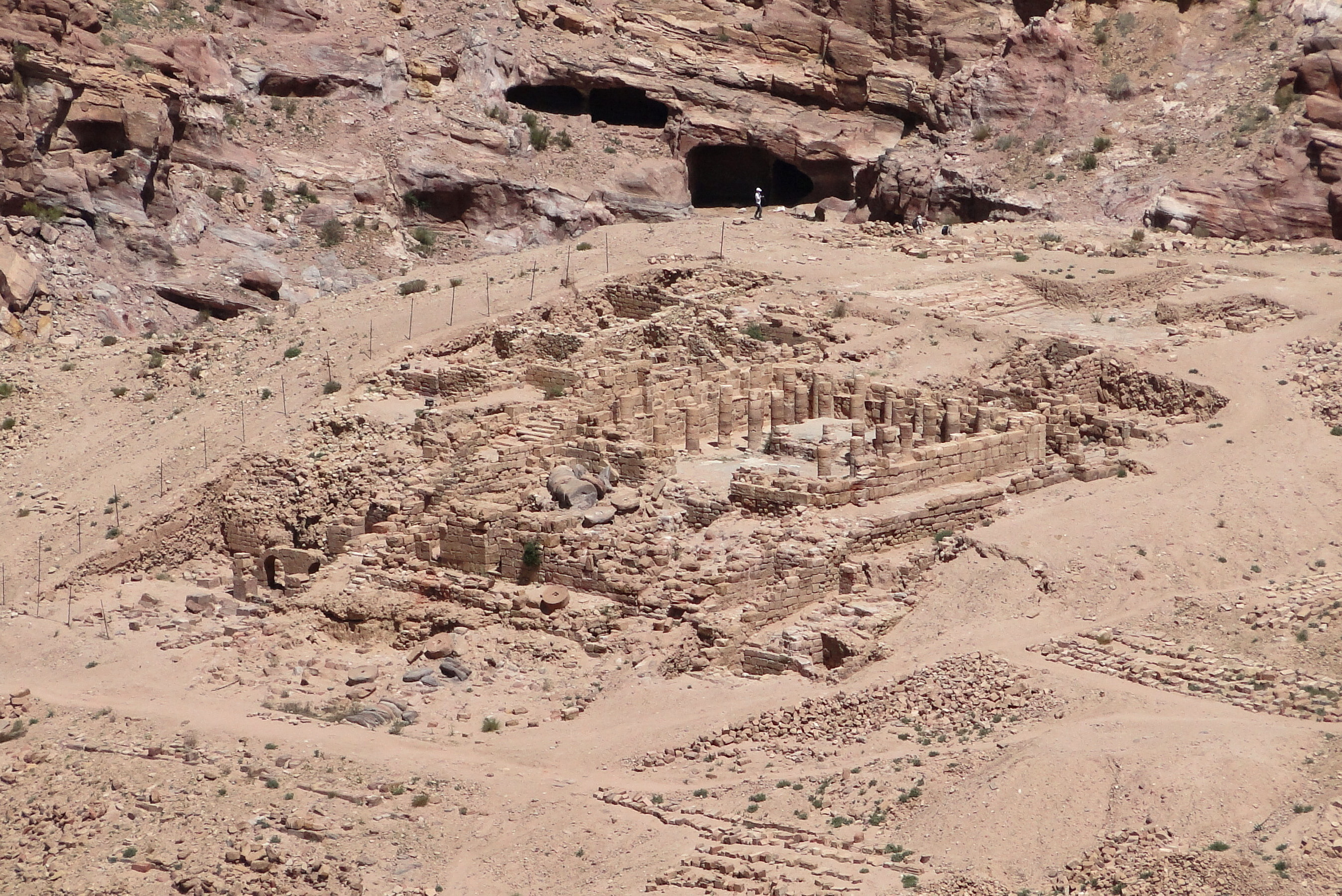
Temple of the Winged Lions

The Temple of the Winged Lions is a large Nabatean temple complex located in Petra, Jordan, and dated to the reign of King Aretas IV (9 BCE–40 CE). The temple is located in Petra's so-called Sacred Quarter, an area situated at the end of Petra's main Colonnaded Street consisting of two majestic temples, the Qasr al-Bint and, opposite, the Temple of the Winged Lions on the northern bank of Wadi Musa.

The temple is likely dedicated to the supreme goddess figure of the Nabateans, but the exact identity of this goddess is uncertain. Temple of Winged Lions was ultimately destroyed in the massive earthquake of 363 CE.

Analyses of the architecture, goods, and practices associated with the Temple of the Winged Lions afford valuable insights into Nabataean religion, economy, and culture. Inscription found at the temple offer a glimpse into the details of Nabataean law and order associated with religious ritual, worship, and the allocation and generation of temple revenue.

== Construction and layout ==
The grand entrance of the temple consists of a large double colonnade running 85m in length and ending in a porch 9.5m in length flanked on either side by large columns. This doorway then leads into a 100 m^{2} cella flanked by a mixture of engaged and standing columns. Within the temple were found fragments of twelve columns topped with winged lion figures, giving the temple its modern name.

Opposite the doorway are two sets of stairs leading up to a raised platform and altar with niches built into the walls behind it. These niches held religious figurines, offerings, and other objects

To the southwest and west within the temple are located a complex of room-dividing wall structures within a singular, massive space, thought to have housed a variety of different workshops dedicated to painting, metal-working, marble-working, and grain processing, as well as the production of other objects for use both inside of the temple itself and for export. Little is known about the east side of the temple except that it contained a large subterranean drain canal.

The interior walls of the temple were originally decorated with stucco, marble, and/or plaster and painted in bright reds, greens, yellows, black and white as well as adorned with intricate frescos reminiscent of Greek "initiation" scenes at Pompeii. However, the temple has been re-purposed in several phases throughout its existence and the decoration was eventually painted over in neutral tones at the same time new floral designs and marble bases were applied to standing columns within the space. Though the exact date of this alteration is unknown, it's thought to have been ordered by King Aretas IV's successor, King Malichus.

== Purpose and use ==
=== Religion ===
The temple was arguably dedicated to the supreme goddess of the Nabateans, as suggested by an inscription found on an "Eye Baetyl" in the temple, reading: "the goddess of... son of...". The "Eye Baetyl" or "Eye-Idol" is one of the most iconic items recovered from the tomb, a square limestone stele decorated with two eyes and a long nose, representative of the goddess and most likely utilized as an object of worship.

The face is thought to belong to either Allat, Al-Uzza, Atargatis, (a Syrian fertility goddess) the Greek Goddess Aphrodite or the Egyptian Goddess Isis. A small statuette depicting Osiris and a mourning Isis (dated to the 6th century BCE) was also recovered, along with fragments of a greenschist, New Kingdom-style statuette of a priest holding a mummified Osiris, pointing to a possible diffusion of Osirian/Isis cultic practice from Egypt into Petra. The presence of this item suggests that the temple served as a space of religious ritual and worship, most of which took place in the cella of the temple. However, it is unknown who was able to participate in these ceremonies.

The implications of the goddess's identity leaves much room for speculation. A temple designed for worshiping Al Uzza, a pre-Islamic goddess closely associated with water, would allow for insight into both the religious aspect of water management and water's relationship with Nabataeans in Petra. A dedication to Isis, however, may suggest a heavy diffusion of Egyptian Osirian cultic practice into the region and/or a possible connection between Isis-Osiris and Al Uzza-Dushara. It is unclear whether or not the Nabataeans may have worshipped Isis and/or Osiris since, due to differences in style and dating, the Egyptian style statuettes may have been brought to and discarded within the site by Egyptian passersby.

=== Economy ===
Housing an extensive complex of specialized workshops, the west side of the "Temple of the Winged Lions" also functioned uniquely as a place of manufacture of marble figurines, iron and bronze items, religious altars, painted ceramics, hooks for hanging meats and poultry and even luxury items such as oils, perfumes, and frankincense and myrrh from southern Arabia intended to be shipped to the Roman world.

The control of a multitude of goods intended for export ensured a degree of financial self-sustainability for the temple that also may have been aided by tourists passing through the temple. The latter is evidenced by a variety of small portable "souvenir" altars uncovered within the temple. In addition, inscription fragments intended for temple officials demonstrate other external sources of revenue brought to the temple in the form of offerings and distributed among priests and other personnel. A recent re-translation of an inscription found in the temple (shown below) lists the donation of gold and silver bullion to the temple while also voicing concern that this payment be adequately used for the needs of the temple, exclusively, highlighting a possible preexisting misappropriation of temple revenue by priests at Petra.

== Excavation ==
While the temple was first noticed by western archaeologists R.E. Br Brünnow and A. von Domaszewski in 1897, proper archaeological excavations began only in 1973 under Phillip C. Hammond and the American Expedition to Petra (AEP). Excavations continued into the twenty-first century, with most fieldwork completed by the AEP in 2005. Over 2,000 individual stratigraphic units have been identified, each of them corresponding to changes in building styles, use, and events related to preservation and destruction.

== Ongoing restoration ==
In 2009, The Temple of the Winged Lions Cultural Resource Management (TWLCRM) initiative was started between the Petra Archaeological Park (PAP) and the Department of Antiquities of Jordan (DOA) in a renewed effort to preserve and rehabilitate the site. "The emphases of TWLCRM were thorough documentation, responsible conservation, and local community involvement in every step of the process," according to Mickel. This included "a core team of five local community members from the Bedouin village of Umm Sayhoun in Jordan who held supervisory roles over excavation, conservation, and documentation of the site. TWLCRM also hired larger teams of local community members for a few weeks at a atime, rotating the members of this team to include and train as many people from the area as possible."

A 2016 effort involved the search for bedrock within the site as the first step in stabilizing the region. In addition, unfilled trenches and scars left by past excavation projects continue to be back-filled and native plant species reintroduced into the landscape in order to re-secure top soils and contribute to environmental improvement at the site. The initiative has also taken steps to involve local indigenous populations in restoration efforts in order to foster a closer relationship between ongoing archaeological investigations in Petra and the often marginalized Bedouin communities living in and around the site.
