= Little Petra =

Archaeological site in Jordan

- البتراء الصغيرة (Arabic)
- Siiq al-Bariid (السيق البارد)
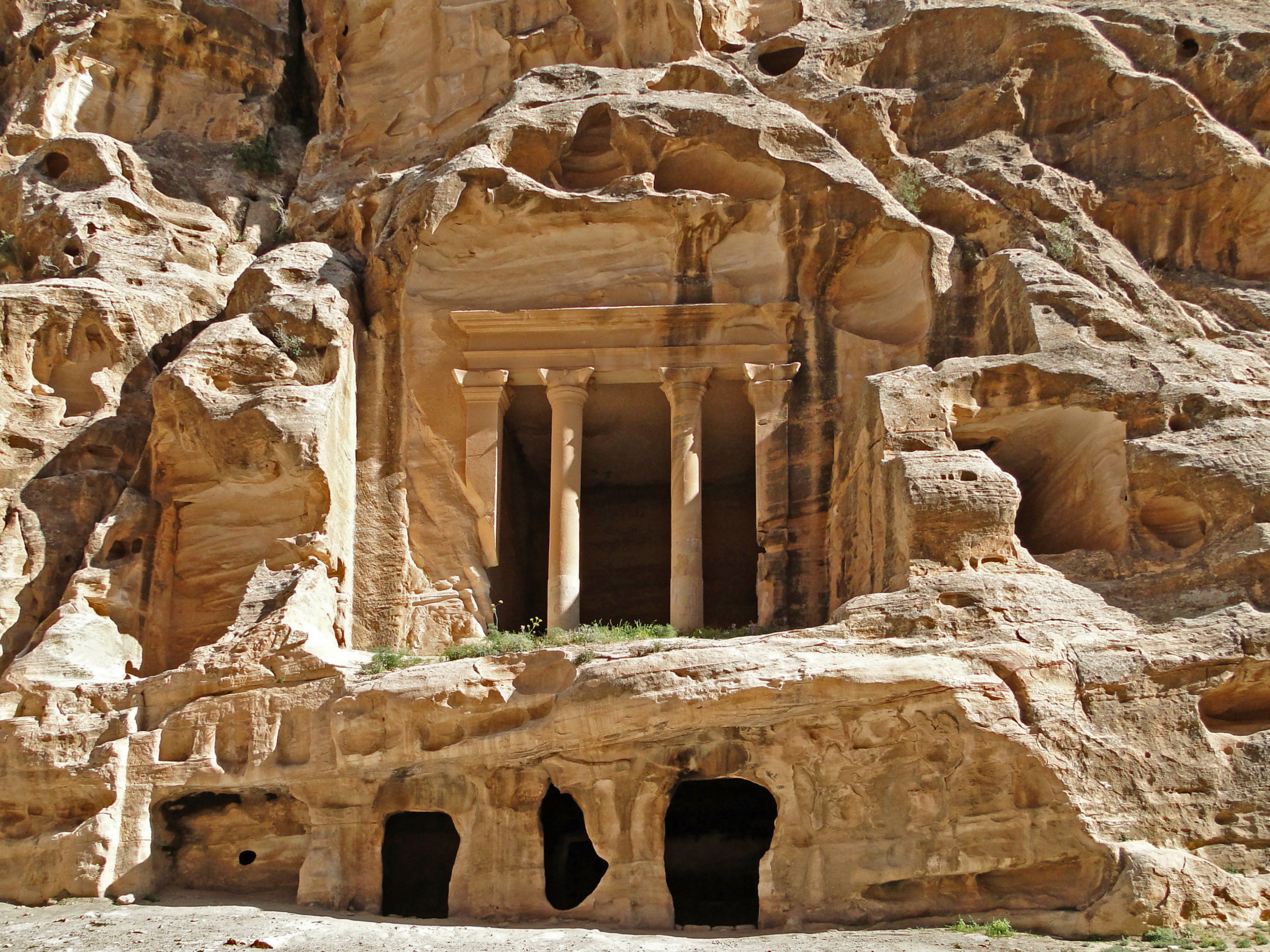
- Triclinium at Little Petra

- Location within Jordan
- 30.37528°N 35.45228°E
- Type: Tell
- Cultures: Nabatean
- Satellite of: Petra
- Location: 8 kilometres (5.0 mi) north of Petra
- Region: Jordan

Site notes
- Material: Sandstone
- Length: 450 metres (1,480 ft)
- Excavation dates: 1957–1983
- Archaeologists: Diana Kirkbride, Brian Byrd
- Condition: Ruins
- Management: Petra Regional Authority
- Public access: Yes

UNESCO World Heritage Site
- Type: Cultural
- Criteria: i, iii, iv
- Designated: 1985 (9th session)
- Reference no.: 326
- Region: Arab States

Little Petra (Arabic: البتراء الصغيرة, al-batrā aṣ-ṣaġïra), also known as Siq al-Barid (Arabic: سيق البريد, literally "the cold canyon"), is an archaeological site located north of Petra and the town of Wadi Musa in the Ma'an Governorate of Jordan. Like Petra, it is a Nabataean site, with buildings carved into the walls of the sandstone canyons. As its name suggests, it is much smaller, consisting of three wider open areas connected by a 450-metre (1,480 ft) canyon. It is part of the Petra Archeological Park, though accessed separately, and included in Petra's inscription as a UNESCO World Heritage Site. It is often visited by tourists in conjunction with Petra itself, since it is free and usually less crowded.

Like Petra, it was probably built during the height of Nabataean influence during the 1st century C.E. While the purpose of some of the buildings is not clear, archaeologists believe that the whole complex was a suburb of Petra, the Nabatean capital, meant to house visiting traders on the Silk Road. After the decline of the Nabataeans, it fell vacant, used only by Bedouin nomads, for centuries. Along with neighboring Beidha, Little Petra was excavated in the later 20th century by Diana Kirkbride and Brian Byrd.

In 2010, a biclinium, or dining room, in one of the caves was discovered to have surviving interior art depicting grapes, vines and putti in great detail with a varied palette, probably in homage to the Greek god Dionysus and the consumption of wine. The 2,000-year-old ceiling frescoes in the Hellenistic style have since been restored. While they are not only the only known example of interior Nabataean figurative painting in situ, they are a very rare large-scale example of Hellenistic painting, considered superior even to similar later Roman paintings at Herculaneum.

== Geography ==
Little Petra is in an arid, mountainous desert region 1,040 metres (3,410 ft) above sea level. To the east the Arabian Desert opens up. On the west the rugged terrain soon descends into the Jordan Rift Valley, with lands around the Dead Sea as low as 400 metres (1,300 ft) below sea level.

It is on the local road that leaves Wadi Musa and follows the edge of the mountains around Petra itself through the small Bedouin village of Umm Sayhoun. About 8 kilometres (5.0 mi) north of Wadi Musa, a short road to the west leads to the narrow, unpaved parking lot for Little Petra and Beidha, a Neolithic site nearby. There is another small Bedouin settlement 1 km (0.6 mi) to the east.

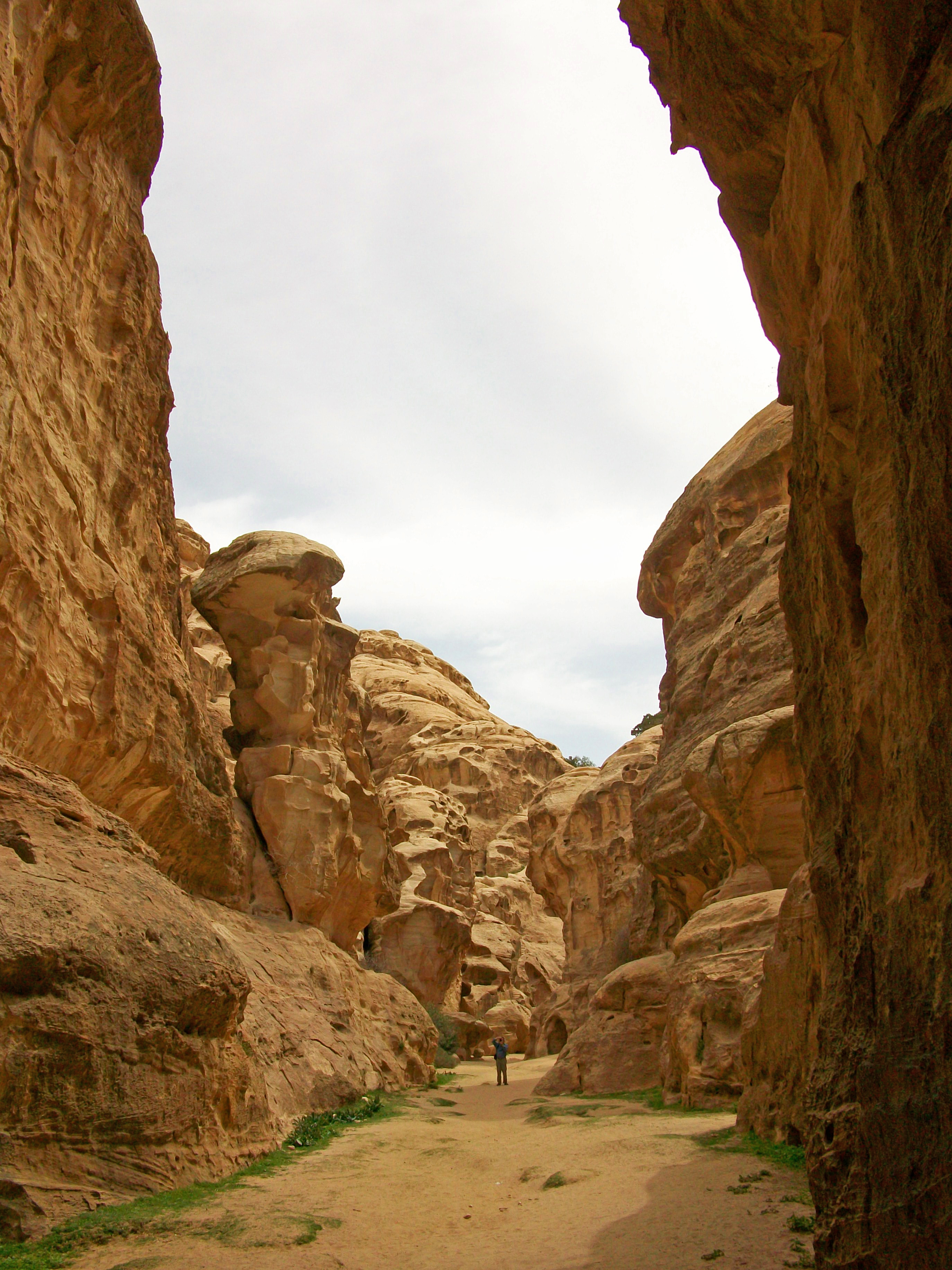
The Siq al-Barid

From the parking lot, Siq al-Barid opens up in the rock facade to the west southwest. Its name, literally "cold canyon", comes from its orientation and its high walls preventing the entry of most available sunlight. The modern name "Little Petra" comes from its similarities to the larger site to the south—both must be entered via a narrow canyon, and consist primarily of Nabataean buildings.

The canyon widens after 400 metres (1,300 ft). In this open area many of the sandstone walls have had openings carved into them; they were used as dwellings. On the south face is a colonnaded triclinium with a projecting pedimented portico that archaeologists believe was used as a temple, though they know very little about it.

The canyon then narrows again for another 50 m (150 ft), leading to another, smaller open area. The carved openings are even more numerous here, including four large triclinia. Archaeologists believe these spaces could have been used to entertain visiting merchants.

On the south side is a small biclinium. It has some rare surviving Nabataean paintings on its rear wall, and so it is called the Painted Room. Opposite the room on the north is a large cistern, part of the water system built by the original inhabitants.

At the west end of the canyon a set of steps leads to the top of the rock. There are panoramic views available of the entire Petra region. A lightly-used foot trail leads from there to Ad-Deir at Petra, 6 kilometres (3.7 mi) to the southwest.

== History ==
Archaeologists believe that Little Petra was established in the 1st century CE, when the Nabataean culture was at its peak in the region. It was probably a suburb of the larger city to the south, perhaps where its more successful merchants lived, and entertained their visiting counterparts. The location may have been chosen because of the nearby older settlement of Beidha, inhabited since the earlier Neolithic era. Since investigations of the site have generally focused on the Nabataean and earlier periods, it is not known whether it was still inhabited around the same time Petra was abandoned, in the 7th century.

For the remainder of the millennium, and much of the next, Little Petra remained unknown to all but the Bedouin nomads who sometimes camped in it or its vicinity. Europeans, who could not visit the Arab world under Islamic rule, heard about Petra but were unsure of its existence. When Swiss traveler Jacob Burckhardt became the first nonlocal visitor to Petra since Roman times in 1812, he did not venture to its north, or did not write about it. Later global visitors to the region likewise seem to have concentrated on the main Petra site. Only in the late 1950s did British archaeologist Diana Kirkbride supplement her excavations at Petra itself with digs in the Beidha area, which included Little Petra, not described as a separate site at the time. Those digs continued until 1983, two years before UNESCO inscribed the Petra area, including Beidha and Little Petra, as a World Heritage Site.

Following that designation, tourism to Petra increased, and spiked upwards again following the 1989 release of Indiana Jones and the Last Crusade, which climaxed with the main characters riding down Petra's Siq to Al-Khazneh, where they found the Holy Grail. To assure that this growth benefited the region and did not degrade its archaeological resources, the Petra Regional Authority was created to manage all the resources within a 755-square-kilometre (292 sq mi) area. Beidha and Little Petra, among other satellite sites, were included in the 264-square-kilometre (102 sq mi) Petra Archaeological Park. The village of Umm Sayhoun was built between Wadi Musa and the two sites to house the Bedouin.

=== Painted Biclinium ===
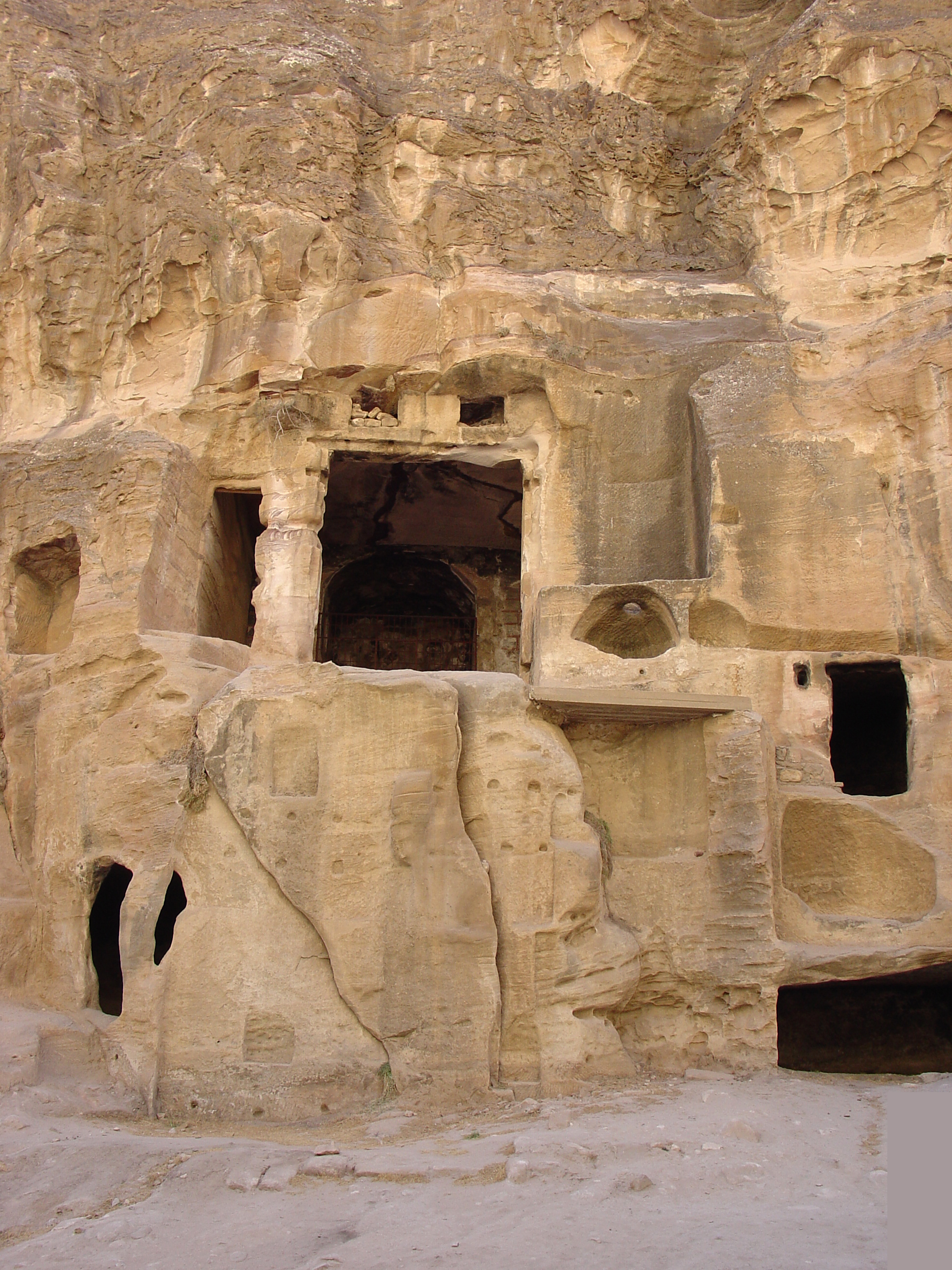
The Painted Biclinium

Located along the main avenue in Little Petra (Siq al-Barid), the Painted Biclinium is a rock-cut biclinium, or dining room, with well preserved wall paintings. In addition to offering the most abundant variety of figural painting from the Nabataean period, the frescoes of the Painted Biclinium may offer clues into the vegetation under cultivation in the area around Siq al-Barid. In addition, the paintings are proof of the importance of Dionysiac religious cult in Nabataea.

==== Location ====
Little Petra (Siq al-Barid) is a narrow wadi located some 8 kilometers north of the Petra city center. The wadi is a rich archaeological site, featuring rock cut tombs, stone-built architecture, and complex hydrological engineering. The site is located in the fertile northern hinterlands of Petra, a landscape that preserves evidence of large-scale viticulture and wine making, alongside the cultivation of grains, olives, and other produce. The Painted Biclinium is located on the south side of the Siq al-Barid. Surrounding the Painted Biclinium are a series of tombs and banqueting halls cut into the natural sandstone of the wadi, alongside the foundations of freestanding structures, cisterns, and water channels.

==== Discovery and fieldwork ====
The building and its frescoes were first photographed in the early 20th century by Père Abel (1906), and smoke damage and Arabic graffiti on the walls of the building demonstrate that the Painted Biclinium was continually occupied by local Bedouins. Studies of the frescoes relied almost exclusively on these early photographs, focusing on the visible iconography of the scenes and identifying the figures of Eros and Pan. When Nelson Glueck visited Little Petra, he did not see the frescoes at the Painted Biclinium for himself "because of the hordes of fleas which infested it". From 2006–2010, the Petra National Trust and the Courtauld Institute of Art in London carried out an extensive conservation project in the Painted Biclinium, which revealed new imagery on the monument and made clear the vibrancy of the color and style of the artwork. Most recently, samples of plaster and mortar were subjected to radiocarbon dating by Yarmouk University in Jordan, providing a calibrated date of 40 BCE–25 CE for the wall paintings.

==== Architecture ====
The Painted Biclinium comprises rock-cut stairs leading up from the floor of the Siq al-Barid, terminating at a platform hewn from the wall of the narrow wadi. The platform stands before the main entrance to the Biclinium, which leads to two chambers, one of which leads into the other. The first chamber is larger than the second, and is rectangular in shape with two benches carved out of the rock on either side of the door. The smaller, interior chamber is vaulted, and has a higher floor level than the first room. The monument parallels other feasting structures from both Little Petra and its environs, some of which are directly associated with nearby tombs and the veneration of ancestor cult, while other examples are not associated with tombs and are instead interpreted as spaces for religious feasting.

==== Frescoes ====
The wall paintings in the Painted Biclinium can be grouped into two major scenes. The larger chamber has its south wall decorated with stucco, creating faux architectural elements reminiscent of some Pompeian wall painting.

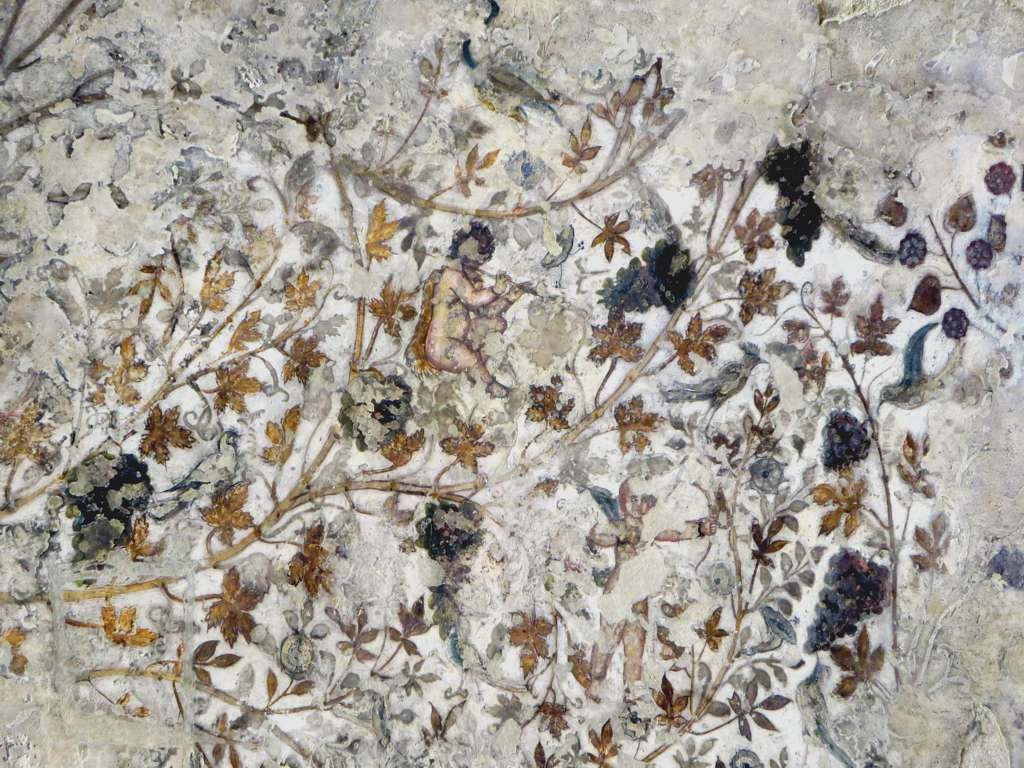
Fresco from the Painted Biclinium

The inner room has painted decoration in a completely different style than the larger outer room. Instead of architectural embellishment, the walls and vaulted ceiling of this room exhibit a complex program of intertwining vines, flowers, figures, several varieties of local birds, and insects. Several erotes—small winged gods associated with love and occasionally the cultivation of wine—are seen participating in viticulture management, using ladders and pruning hooks, carrying baskets of gathered grapes, and defending the vines from scavenging birds. The erotes are armed with bows, arrows, and spears. In addition to the domesticated and harvested grape vines, wild raspberry vines and field bindweed flowers wrap throughout the scene to pay homage to the local flora of Petra's northern hinterland. Twaissi et al. (2010) were able to identify an additional anthropomorphic figure in the scene in addition to the erotes, who they interpret as a representation of the Romanized Egyptian goddess. However, the overall iconographic scene and architectural parallels elsewhere in the area of Petra lend weight to the attribution of the space as a center of Dionysiac worship.

In addition to the figural and floral painting within the inner room of the Painted Biclinium, the room appears to have been further embellished with an intricate program of stuccoed decoration. Remnants of an entablature are preserved on the east and west walls of the room, and the center of the vault once held a stucco medallion.

==== Significance ====
The significance of these paintings lies in their figurative elements, a subject that is often absent in preserved Nabataean painting and other media. While a small fragment of a human face was found during the excavations of the Great Temple and the excavation of the Temple of the Winged Lions brought to light other select fragments, the frescoes at the Painted Biclinium form both the most complete painted scene in the Nabataean archaeological record and the only one remaining in situ. The features of the figural composition, including the almond eyes and round chins, have parallels with other pieces of Hellenistic painting and mosaic, while the floral and faunal subjects are distinctly local. In addition, while the archaeological record pointing to Dionysiac worship appears prolific among the Nabataean elite, few contexts preserve any record of this practice outside of architecture and pottery. The Painted Biclinium, then, serves to provide a colorful flourish to our understanding of this religious tradition in the cultivated rich semi-arid landscape around Petra.

== Access ==
Like Petra, Little Petra is open to the public during the daytime. It is, however, operated separately, and does not require an admission ticket and fee as Petra does. The local Bedouins sell souvenirs and snacks in the small parking lot, which also serves Beidha. Bedouin herders sometimes take their stock into the site to water at the cisterns.

Many visitors to Petra have increasingly been including Little Petra on their itineraries. Guidebooks recommend it as less crowded and more relaxed than Petra itself. The Painted House, which has no counterpart at Petra, has also added to the attraction.

It is also possible to hike via the 6-kilometre (3.7 mi) trail from the end of the canyon to Ad-Deyr at Petra. Those who make the journey are advised to do so with a guide as the trail, while obvious in many places, is not formally marked. Hikers are also cautioned against attempting the trail alone, or late in the day, as nights in the region are often cold. It is also forbidden to enter Petra without having paid the larger site's admission.

== See also ==
- List of World Heritage Sites in the Arab States
- Mada'in Saleh, a Nabataean city in Saudi Arabia also inscribed as a World Heritage Site
- Negev incense route, ruins of four Nabataean cities in southern Israel, inscribed as a World Heritage Site
