= Qasr al-Bint =

Temple in Petra, Jordan

Coordinates: 30.3295°N 35.4401°E

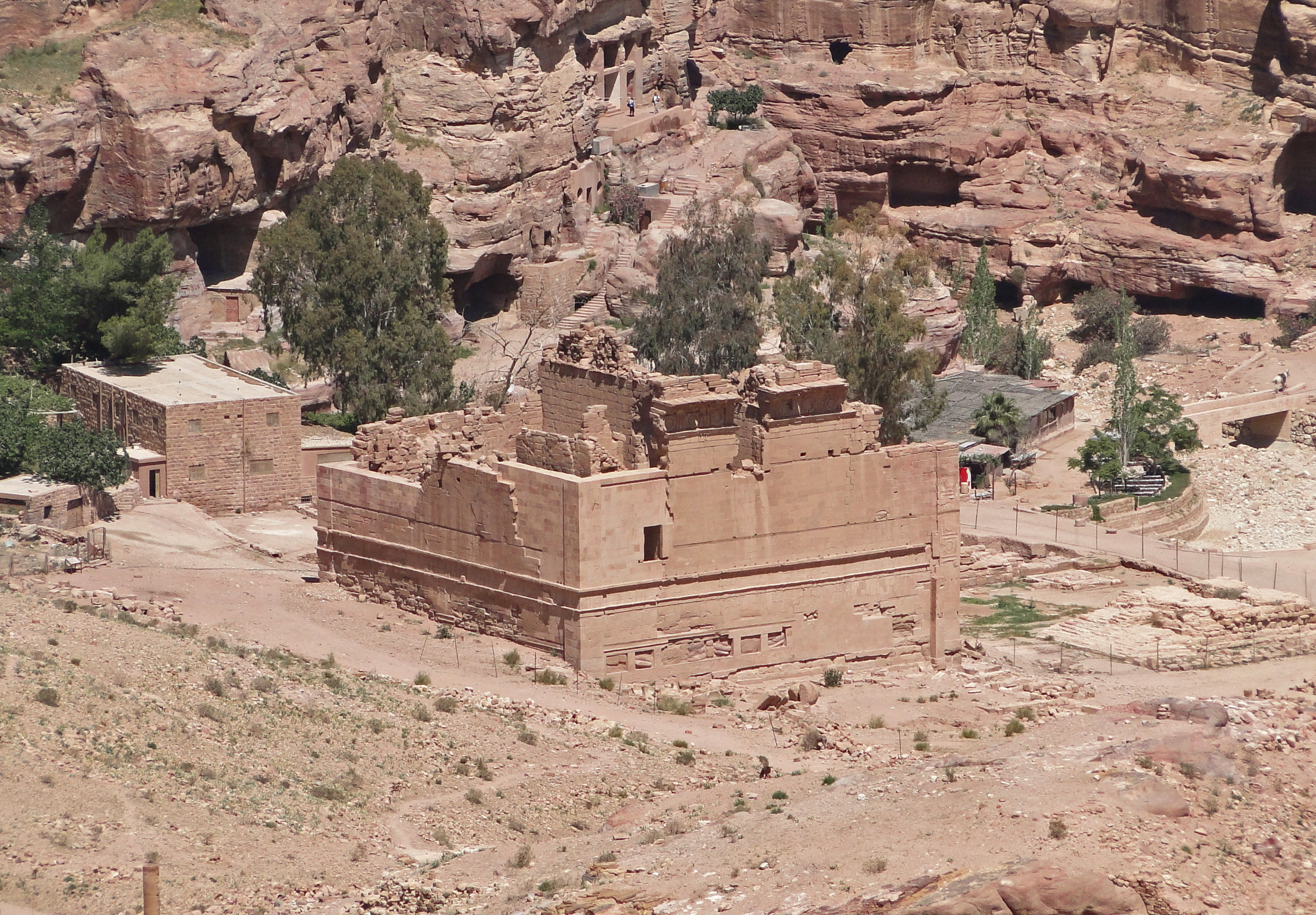
Qasr al-Bint

The Qasr al-Bint is a religious temple in the Nabataean city of Petra. It faces the Wadi Musa and is located to the northwest of the Great Temple and the southwest of the Temple of the Winged Lions. One of the best preserved ancient structures surviving in Petra today, it stands near the monumental gate and was a key focal point on the colonnaded street, as well as a focus of religious worship.

== Name ==
The full modern Arabic name of the ruin is Qasr al-Bint Fir'aun, or "the palace of Pharaoh's daughter". This name derives from a local folktale according to which the virtuous daughter of a wicked pharaoh determined to decide between her suitors by setting them the task of providing a water supply for her palace. Two suitors completed the task simultaneously by directing water to the palace from different springs in the hills surrounding it. The princess accepted the more modest of the two suitors who ascribed his success to God.

== Associated deity ==
The deity to whom the Qasr al Bint was dedicated has been a source of scholarly debate. The temple faces north towards a sacrificial altar that was dedicated to Dushara, the main Nabataean deity, and due to this spatial connection it has been suggested by some scholars that it was also Dushara who was worshiped at the Qasr al-bint. A Greek inscription in the chamber to the east of the cella suggests that Zeus Hypsistos may also have received devotions at the Qasr. Others have suggested that the presence in the cella of a baetyl stone fragment, which originally would have been placed on a base faced with gold, indicates that it was actually Al-Uzza, equated with the Greek goddess Aphrodite, that was worshiped here. Healey, who is considered one of the main authorities on Nabataean religion, believes that the Qasr may be the Temple to Aphrodite that is referred to in the Babatha correspondence, a cache of documents that were hidden in a cave at the time of the Bar Kokhba Revolt.

== Plans and material ==
The Qasr al-Bint sits upon a podium made of a rubble core retained by courses of ashlar masonry. The temple itself is also constructed of ashlar blocks. Access to the temple is provided by a monumental marble staircase of 27 steps, which is divided by a landing. The plan is square and consists of a pronaos (or vestibule), a naos (or chamber), and a tripartite adyton which contains the cella, the most sacred part of the temple.

The vestibule was originally framed by four columns with Corinthian capitals. None of these columns remain standing, and only fragments of the capitals have been found. There are additional chambers on either side of the cella. These two chambers originally had upper rooms that could be accessed by staircases concealed in the building's thick walls. Both the interior and exterior walls were originally covered in decorative plasterwork, some of which is still extant. Wooden-string courses line the lengths of the walls, and wooden wedges can still be found between some of the stones. The wood used in the structure has been identified as Lebanese Cedar.

== Chronology and dating ==
The chronology of the Qasr al-Bint has been debated for decades. It appears that the current structure was built on the remains of an earlier poorly understood monument. Pottery fragments recovered from the base of the structure have been dated to 50–30/20 BCE. Dates have been suggested for the current building ranging from the first century BCE to the end of the first-century CE. Radiocarbon dating of the remaining wood from the site, which was done in 2014, indicates that the structure has a terminus post quem (earliest possible date for construction) in the beginning of the first century CE. This date is supported by the similarities between the architectural decoration of the Khazneh, which has been firmly dated, and that of the Qasr al-Bint. Stylistically, buildings of this date have intricate moldings and capitals with fine floral motifs, both of which have been found at the Qasr al-Bint

A second phase of construction dating from 106 CE to the late third century CE is also attested based on the presence of inscriptions, coins, and pottery. At some point, probably during the Palmyrene revolt of 268–272 CE, the Qasr al-Bint was vandalized and burned. It was later occupied and looted for building materials during the Medieval period. During the Medieval period, a ramp was constructed in front of the temple using architectural fragments and column drums from the structure itself. It is believed that the ramp was placed there in order to allow for the removal of some of the stones, which were then reused in other structures

== Seismic resistance ==
The Qasr al-Bint is one of the few ancient built-structures that remain standing in Petra. This is in spite of the fact that ashlar masonry, which was used in its construction, is vulnerable to damage by ground vibration during earthquakes. The symmetrical plan of Qasr el-Bint may have helped to reduce the moments of torsion that occurred during seismic activity at the site, however. The use of wooden string courses may also have enhanced the energy dissipation capacity of the structure. Some scholars believe that it is due to the inclusion of these wooden-string courses that the building is still standing at its full height.
