= Friedrich Preisigke =

German Egyptologist (1856–1924)

Friedrich Preisigke (14 February 1856 in Dessau – 8 February 1924 in Heidelberg) was a German Egyptologist and papyrologist.

== Life ==
Born in Dessau, he attended the Cathedral gymnasium at Brandenburg an der Havel, later became a clerk in the German Post Office and in 1897 he was appointed director of the telegraph lines in Berlin. Although he had already launched a white collar career, his deep love for classical literature and ancient history led him to closely follow the lectures of great scholars of the time, such as the philologist Ulrich von Wilamowitz-Moellendorff, epigraphist Hermann Dessau and philologist Paul M. Meyer, by whom he was introduced to the study of papyrology. In 1903 Preisigke graduated from the University of Halle with a thesis supervised by the orientalist Ulrich Wilcken. In 1908 he became Director of Telegraphs in Strasbourg, and in 1913 was appointed professor at the Faculty of Philosophy of the University of Strasbourg. In June 1915 he was elected an extraordinary member of the Academy of Sciences in Heidelberg, and in 1918 founded the Institut für Papyrologie in the same city, which continues today to be Germany's leading centre of papyrology.

== Works ==
The activity of Preisigke concentrated mainly in the reconstruction of the financial and administrative system in Egypt during the Roman occupation, particularly the bank giro, the fruit of which was published in 1910:

- Girowesen im griechischen Ägypten, enthaltend Korngiro, Geldgiro, Girobanknotariat mit Einschluss des Archivwesens. 1910.

A major lexical source utilised by Liddell & Scott (LSJ), Bauer (BGAD) and Moulton & Milligan (MM) is the papyrus collection:

- Sammelbuch griechischer Urkunden aus Ägypten Wissenschaftliche Gesellschaft in Strassburg. Strasbourg 1915

Another fundamental contribution to scientific papyrology by this writer was the dictionary of Greek language papyrus documents of Egypt finished and published 20 years after his death titled:

- Wörterbuch der griechischen Papyrusurkunden mit Einschluss University of Heidelberg, 1944
