= Qasrawet =

Archaeological site in Sinai, Egypt

- Location within Egypt
- 30°56′08.7″N 32°49′25.3″E
- Type: Archaeological site
- Periods: Hellenistic period, Nabataean, Late Roman and Byzantine
- Location: Sinai Peninsula, Egypt

History
- Built: 1st century BCE (Nabataean settlement)
- Abandoned: Late 2nd or early 3rd century CE (Nabataean settlement); end of 4th century CE (fortified settlement)

Site notes
- Excavation dates: 1911, 1975–1976
- Archaeologists: Jean Clédat; Eliezer D. Oren; Ehud Netzer
- Discovered: 1909

Qasrawet is an archaeological site in the northern Sinai Peninsula of Egypt. Occupied from at least the 2nd century BCE, it developed into a monumental Nabataean settlement by the 1st century BCE. Its remains include temples and a large necropolis. The settlement declined during the 2nd century and was abandoned by the late 2nd or early 3rd century CE.

A fortified settlement, or castrum, was established over part of the earlier site in the Late Roman period. It was occupied mainly during the 4th century before being abandoned by the end of the century. Excavations have yielded evidence of the presence of Jews and Christians. The site was discovered by Jean Clédat in 1909 and systematically excavated by a team from Ben-Gurion University of the Negev in 1975–1976.

== Name ==
According to archaeologist Yotam Tsafrir, the modern name Qasrawet may derive from the Autaei, an Arab group attested in ancient sources as inhabiting the area in the first century CE. Although these sources label the Autaei "Arabs" rather than "Nabataean" (as was typical of writings on the Sinai Peninsula generally), Tsafrir has argued they were most likely Nabataean. On this reading, Qasrawet traces back either to a Latin form, Castrum Autaei, or, more probably, to an equivalent Greek name for a fort of the Autaei, Kastron Autaioi. The Arabic term Qasr, meaning "fort", is associated with the site's Late Roman occupation as a fortified castrum, a designation attested by a Greek ostracon found at the site.

In the 1950s, Jean Starcky and John Strugnell proposed that the name Qasrawet may derive from 'wytw (Imperial Aramaic: עויתו), a place named alongside Shuqafiyeh in an inscription found at the latter, describing the goddess al-Kutba (identified with 'Azizu, personification of the morning star) as venerated at temples in both locations.

== Location ==
Qasrawet is located in northern Sinai, about 10 kilometres (6.2 mi) south of the Arish–Qantara road. The ancient city of Pelusium is about 30 kilometres (19 mi) to the west.

== Description ==
=== Nabataean site ===
Pottery evidence (including Knidian, Koan, and Rhodian wine amphorae, and Megarian bowls/lamps) indicates occupation as early as the 2nd century BCE, when Qasrawet served as a caravan station toward the Gulf of Suez. A monumental Nabatean settlement was well established by the 1st century BCE and flourished through the 1st century CE. Qasrawet survived the Roman annexation of the Nabatean kingdom in 106 CE, but entered decline in the 2nd century due to unstable conditions in Egypt, its main market. The Nabataean settlement was finally abandoned, without evidence of destruction, in the late 2nd or early 3rd century CE, after repeated raids by Thamudic and other nomadic Arab tribes.

==== Temples ====
Excavations identified two temples at the site, known as the western and central temples, which formed a single complex or temenos. The western temple was originally constructed in Egyptian architectural style in the 1st century BCE; it was renovated in the 1st century CE, when niches with cult stelae or betyls were added around its altar hall, and remained in use until it was abandoned in the late 2nd or early 3rd century CE. The central temple was built nearby in the 1st century CE on a similar orientation, consisting of two square structures with a monumental pylon façade.

==== Necropolis ====
A large necropolis has been found at Qasrawet. The so-called "Tomb 2" in Qasrawet's necropolis is a stone chamber built like a sarcophagus but lacking a floor, sealed with flat covering stones; it had already been robbed in antiquity. Clédat's excavation of the site recovered a single pair of earrings, and four additional, unpaired earrings were found in later excavations. Two earrings are today on display at the Ismailia Museum.

=== Late Roman/Byzantine site ===
About a century after abandonment, a new fortified settlement (a "Castrum") was built over part of the earlier site, covering about 7.5 acres. This settlement was enclosed by a fortification wall with square towers and had densely packed mud-brick houses along narrow streets. Some house walls had stucco decorations depicting caravans, camels, dogs, gazelles, and date palms. Household goods, cooking installations, and hundreds of stone, clay, and glass vessels were found intact where abandoned.

A Greek triangular ostracon found at the site has been read as identifying its bearer as "Ps[...]iom[...]iasis Phaiesios, son of Akes and brother of 'Azazios", possibly a scholarius (imperial guard), with the remaining lines referring to the "Bay of Carandra" and a place called Castrum. David Rokeah interpreted the passage as describing a route in the border region of Egypt and Sinai and suggested that the unusual identification of the bearer may indicate that the ostracon was intended to identify him when he arrived at his destination.

Oil lamps made of clay were found in Late Roman residential areas; some bear Christian staurograms, while others feature Jewish symbols such as menorahs and shofars. Oren inferred from these finds that the fortified settlement or garrison was manned also by Jewish and Christian soldiers, militia members or veterans.

Coin evidence dates the fortified settlement's main occupation to the 4th century CE; it was abandoned hurriedly by the end of that century.

== Research history ==
Egyptologist Jean Clédat discovered the site in 1909 and investigated it in 1911. The next year, he published descriptions of six tombs and three mausolea in the necropolis.

The North Sinai Expedition of Ben-Gurion University of the Negev carried out a regional survey and systematic excavations at the site in 1975–1976, under the direction of Eliezer D. Oren; the excavations of the temple quarter were directed by Ehud Netzer. They also cleared two of the tombs previously investigated by Clédat. The work took place during the Israeli occupation of the Sinai Peninsula.

== See also ==
- Avdat
- Hegra
- Khirbet et-Tannur
- Petra
- Mampsis

== Bibliography ==
- Gawlikowski, Michal (2003), "The Nabataean Temple at Qasrawet", in Hawass, Zahi (ed.), Egyptology at the Dawn of the Twenty-first Century. Proceedings of Egyptologists, Cairo, 2000, pp. 195–199, doi:10.11588/propylaeumdok.00005004
- Oren, Eliezer D. (1982). "Excavations at Qasrawet in North-Western Sinai: Preliminary Report". Israel Exploration Journal. 32 (4). Israel Exploration Society: 203–211. JSTOR 27925855.
- Rokéaḥ, David (1983). "Qasrawet: The Ostracon". Israel Exploration Journal. 33 (1/2). Israel Exploration Society: 93–96. JSTOR 27925879.
- Rosenthal-Heginbottom, Renate (2015). "Grave Goods and Nabatean Identity: Mampsis and Qasrawet". Eretz-Israel: Archaeological, Historical and Geographical Studies. 31: 154*–165*. JSTOR 24433098.
- Strugnell, John (1959). "The Nabataean Goddess Al-Kutba' and Her Sanctuaries". Bulletin of the American Schools of Oriental Research. 156: 29–36. JSTOR 1356058.
- Tsafrir, Yoram (1982). "Qasrawet: Its Ancient Name and Inhabitants". Israel Exploration Journal. 32 (4). Israel Exploration Society: 212–214. JSTOR 27925849.
