= Malichus =

Malichus is a given name. It may refer to:

- Malichus I, a king of Nabataea who reigned from 59 to 30 BC.
- Malichus II, a king of Nabataea who reigned from 40 to 70 AD.
- Malichus, assassin of Antipater the Idumaean

== See also ==
- List of Nabataean kings
- Malchus (disambiguation)
