= Phasaelis (princess) =

First wife of Herod Antipas

Phasael or Pasiel (born in 5/4 BC), in Greek sources Phasaelis, was a princess of Nabatea, daughter of King Aretas IV Philopatris and the first wife of Herod Antipas, ruler of Galilee and Perea.

== Life ==
Phasaelis was born to the king of the Nabataeans, Aretas IV Philopatris. It is assumed that her mother was his first wife (and co-ruler) Chuldu.

The ancestry of Phasaelis parents is a matter of debate but it has been suggested that Aretas IV was a descendant of Malichus I, and the off-spring of Obodas II and his second wife Hagaru, while Aretas wife, Huldu was a daughter of Obodas II and another wife, therefore making them brother and sister. Such sibling-marriages were common practice in the region for the ruling class,notably among the Ptolemaic dynasty of Egypt and the Seleucid.

The sequence in which the king's offspring is listed on an inscription found at the Obodas Chapel of Wadi Nmeir in Petra indicates that Phasaelis was the couple's fourth child, but the eldest of their daughters. Her siblings includedMalichus II, Obodat, Rabbel, Su'udat and Hagiru.

Coins have been found with the profile of her father Aretas IV on the obverse, and Phasaelis' name on the reverse, which could indicate her birth to be 3-5 BC.

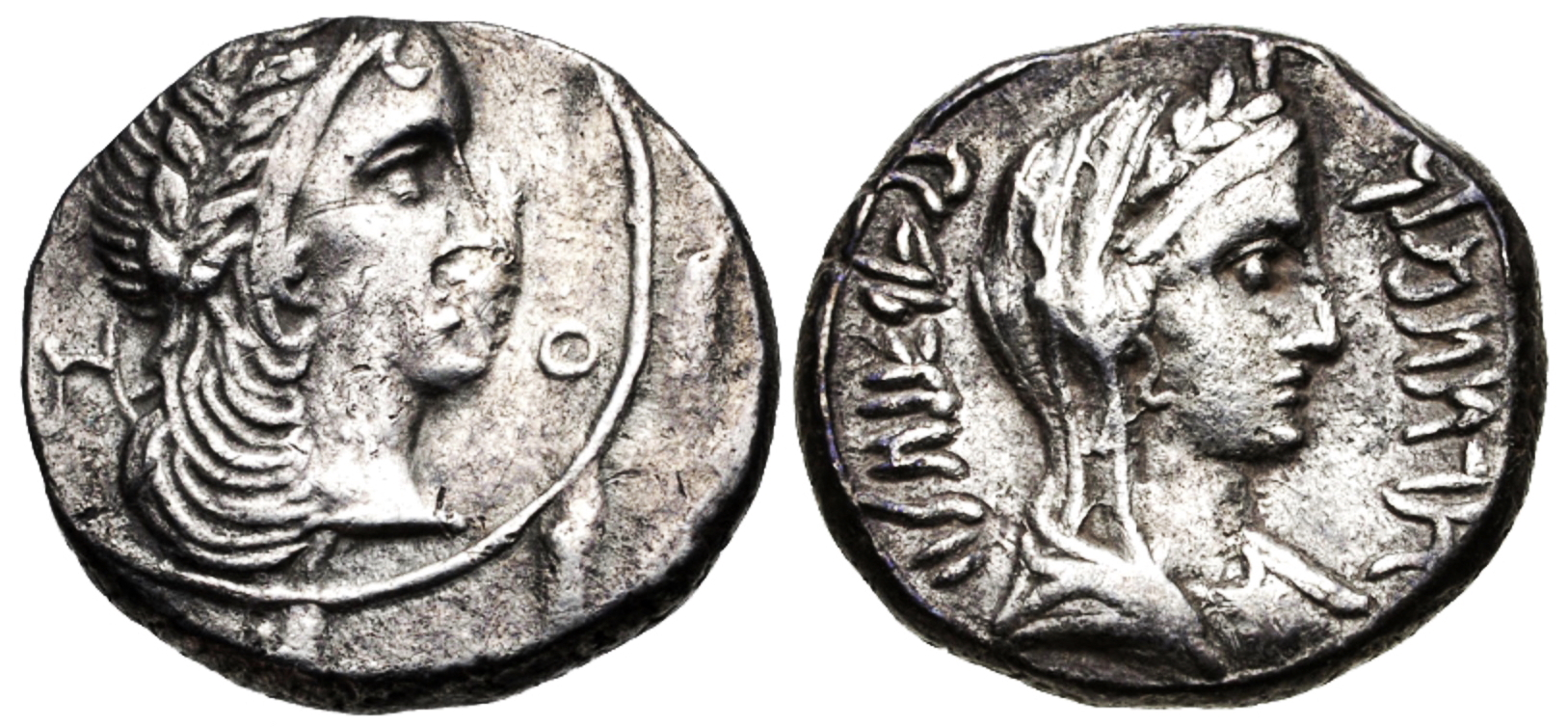
Drachma with Phasaelis parents Aretas IV and Huldu

== Marriage ==
Going by the tentative dating of the coins inscribed with her name, her marriage to Herod Antipas took place in 7 or 6 AD, when Phasaelis would have been around 11–12 years old. The two kingdoms due to their proximity already had significant familial and financial connections,Herod Antipas paternal great-grandmother Cypros, had herself been an Nabatean noblewoman and relative of Aretas III.

There is also a high likelihood that the marriage was arranged or at least promoted by Augustus, who often married the vassals of the Roman Empire together in order to keep the peace between their kingdoms. Such had been the case with Herod Antipas' paternal aunt, Salome I. Augustus interest in Nabatea is further evinced by the fact that he had also removed (and later executed) the powerful Nabatean general Syllaeus from power, which ensured that Phasaelis father Aretas IV could ascend to the kingship of Nabatea without political rivals

The marriage of Phasaelis and Herodes Antipas thus not only strengthened already existing ties between Judea and Nabatea, but also ensured there would be no attacks of the eastern border tetrarchy of Perea by the Nabataeans.

Phasaelis and Herod Antipas were married for over 20 years, but there are no recorded children of this marriage. During this time, Herod Antipas did not take any other wives. Some researchers have theorized that Phasaelis and Herod Antipas had a daughter named Herodias Salome, as an attempt to reconcile some dating inconsistencies and explain why Salome, Herod Antipas' step-daughter and grand-niece, is sometimes referred to as his daughter.

In 23 AD, Herod Antipas was visiting his half-brother Herod II, who was then living in Rome as a private citizen. During his stay, he became enamored with his brother's wife Herodias. Herodias subsequently divorced Herod II under the Roman law.

The exact marriage date of Herod Antipas and Herodias is unknown, but in 26 AD Phasaelis found out about the relationship and discovered Herod Antipas' intention to divorce her.

The texts use the terms divorce and repudiation interchangeably, but according to the Talmudic law, a husband could repudiate his wife freely, but a wife could only ask for a divorce, and it was up to the husband to allow it. However, the extent to which the Herodian dynasty actually practiced Judaism is unclear, and it is known that they were heavily influenced by Roman law and culture; thus, Herod Antipas might have been planning to divorce Phasaelis according to just the Roman law.

Desiring to return to her homeland, Phasaelis used the pretext of visiting the palace of Machaerus situated by the Dead Sea. Phasaelis then fled across the border to her father, whom she told of her husband's intention to divorce her and marry Herodias. This caused relations between Aretas and Herod Antipas to sour. Aretas IV subsequently invaded Galilee and Perea, and his armies defeated his former son-in-law in battle in 36 AD.

After this date, there is no mention of Phasaelis, and the rest of her life remains unknown.

== In media ==
Elbridge Streeter Brooks wrote a historical romance A Son of Issachar: A Romance of the Days of Messias (1890) where Herod's repudiated wife appears as a character named "Princess Amina".

Phasaelis appears a supporting character in The Book of Longings by Sue Monk Kidd (2020).

In the movie "The Big Fisherman" (1959), which is based on a 1949 book by the same name by Lloyd C. Douglas, the female protagonist is the daughter of "Princess Arnon" (played by Marian Seldes) and Herod Antipas. The daughter vows revenge on her father for his behavior towards her mother.

Phaselis appears briefly as a non-speaking character in the TV film Mary Magdalene (2000), played by an uncredited actress.

== See also ==
- List of biblical figures identified in extra-biblical sources
