= Siege of Jerusalem (63 BC) =

Part of Pompey the Great's campaigns in the East

Coordinates: 31°47′00″N 35°13′00″E

- Part of the Hasmonean civil war
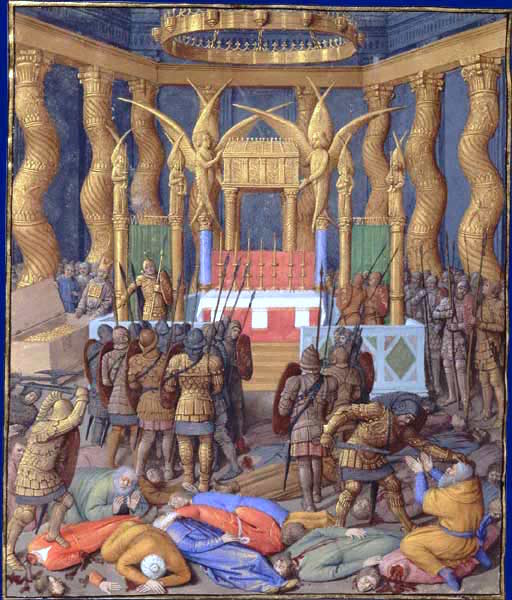
- Pompey enters the Jerusalem Temple. Painting by Jean Fouquet, after an event recorded by Flavius Josephus in The Antiquities of the Jews.
Date	63 BC
Location	Jerusalem
Result	Roman victory
Territorial changes	Judea incorporated into the Roman Republic

Belligerents
Roman Republic	Hasmonean Kingdom

Commanders and leaders
Pompey the Great; Faustus Sulla	Aristobulus II

Strength
12,000 Roman troops	

The siege of Jerusalem in 63 BC occurred during the campaigns of Roman general Pompey the Great in the East, shortly after his successful conclusion of the Third Mithridatic War. Pompey had been asked to intervene in a dispute over succession to the Hasmonean throne, which turned into a war between Hyrcanus II and Aristobulus II. His conquest of Jerusalem spelled the end of an independent Jewish state, and thus the incorporation of Judea as a client kingdom of the Roman Republic and later as a province of the Roman Empire.

== Background ==
The death of Hasmonean queen Alexandra Salome plunged Judea into a civil war between her two sons, Hyrcanus and Aristobulus. After Aristobulus had ousted his elder brother from both the throne and the high priesthood in Jerusalem, Antipater the Idumean advised Hyrcanus to enlist the aid of King Aretas III of Nabataea. In return for the promise of territorial concessions, Aretas provided Hyrcanus with 50,000 soldiers, and their joint forces besieged Aristobulus in Jerusalem.

Pompey had followed the successful conclusion of the Third Mithridatic War with the creation of the Province of Syria and had spent the years of 64 and 63 BC in bringing Roman law and order to the region. Events in Judea prompted Aemilius Scaurus, Pompey's legate in Damascus, to arrive in Jerusalem. Scaurus was approached by both parties, but the issue was settled by a bribe from Aristobulus, and Scaurus ordered Aretas to lift his siege of the city. As the Nabataean army withdrew towards Petra, Aristobulus set off in pursuit and defeated the Nabataeans at Papyron.

When Pompey himself arrived in Damascus in 63 BC, both Hyrcanus and Aristobulus visited him there. Pompey put off resolving the issue and informed the opposing parties he would resolve it once he had arrived in Judea in person. Aristobulus did not wait for Pompey's decision and left Damascus to shut himself away at his fortress of Alexandrium. That angered Pompey, who marched into Judea with his forces at the sight of which Aristobulus yielded. When Pompey's General Aulus Gabinius led a force to take Jerusalem, however, Aristobulus's supporters refused to let the Roman troops in. Incensed, Pompey had Aristobulus arrested and prepared to besiege the city.

== Siege ==
When Pompey arrived in Jerusalem, he surveyed the city:

for he saw the walls were so firm, that it would be hard to overcome them; and that the valley before the walls was terrible; and that the temple, which was within that valley, was itself encompassed with a very strong wall, insomuch that if the city were taken, that temple would be a second place of refuge for the enemy to retire to.

— Josephus, The Wars of the Jews 1:141

Hyrcanus II still had supporters in the city, who opened a gate, probably along the northwestern section of the city wall, and let the Romans in. This allowed Pompey to take hold of Jerusalem's upper city, including the royal palace, with Aristobulus's party holding the eastern portions of the city: the Temple Mount and the City of David. The Jews consolidated their hold by breaking down the bridge over the Tyropoeon Valley, which connected the upper city with the Temple Mount. Pompey offered them the chance to surrender, but their refusal made him begin to prosecute the siege with vigour. Pompey had his forces construct a wall of circumvallation around the areas that were held by the Jews. He then pitched his camp within the wall, to the north of the Temple, where stood a saddle allowed access to the Temple and so was guarded by the citadel known as the Baris, augmented by a ditch. A second camp was erected southeast of the Temple.

The troops then set about filling the ditch that protected the northern part of the Temple enclosure and building two ramparts, one next to the Baris and the other on the west. The defenders, from their superior position, sought to hinder Roman efforts. When the banks were complete, Pompey erected siege towers and brought up siege engines and battering rams from Tyre. Under the protection of slingers driving the defenders from the walls, they began to batter the walls surrounding the Temple.

After three months, Pompey's troops managed to overthrow one of the Baris towers and were able to enter the Temple precinct, both from the citadel and from the west. First over the wall was a senior officer in Pompey's army named Faustus Cornelius Sulla, the son of former dictator Sulla. Faustus was followed by two centurions, Furius and Fabius, who each led a cohort, and the Romans soon overcame the Jewish defenders, 12,000 of whom were slaughtered. Only a few Romans troops were killed.

Pompey himself entered the Temple's Holy of Holies, which only the High Priest was allowed to enter, and thus desecrated it. He did not remove anything, neither its treasures nor any funds, and the next day, he ordered the Temple cleansed and its rituals resumed. Pompey then returned to Rome, taking Aristobulus with him for his triumphal procession.

== Aftermath ==
The siege and the conquest of Jerusalem were a disaster for the Hasmonean Kingdom. Pompey reinstated Hyrcanus II as the High Priest but stripped him of his royal title. However, Rome later recognised him as an ethnarch in 47 BC.

Judea remained autonomous but was obliged to pay tribute and became dependent on the Roman administration in Syria. The kingdom was dismembered and was forced to relinquish the coastal plain, depriving it of access to the Mediterranean, as well as parts of Idumea and Samaria. Several Hellenistic cities were granted autonomy to form the Decapolis, leaving the state greatly diminished.

Roman historian Cassius Dio wrote in his description of the siege that "the genos (of the Jews), despite frequent repression, had nonetheless greatly increased to the extent that it has won its way to the right of freedom in its observances."

== Legacy ==
Historian Nadav Sharon identifies Pompey's conquest of Jerusalem in 63 BCE as a watershed moment in Jewish history, marking the end of Jewish statehood in the Land of Israel. He argues that this event initiated a transitional period in which Judea began to experience "(semi)diasporan conditions," with statelessness and foreign rule generating structural changes that reshaped Jewish society. According to Sharon, these developments laid the groundwork for the survival of Jewish life after the destruction of the Temple in 70 CE and contributed to the evolution of Rabbinic Judaism.
