= Tell esh-Shuqafiya Nabataean inscriptions =

The Tell esh-Shuqafiya Nabataean inscriptions are two Nabataean inscriptions from Tell esh-Shuqafiya in the Wadi Tumilat, Egypt, just south of the Tell er-Retaba.

They are important evidence for the presence of Nabataeans in Egypt in the Late Ptolemaic and early Roman periods, and for the worship of Al-Kutbay and Dushara outside Nabataea. The second inscription is significant because it preserves a triple date. They are the oldest extant Nabataean inscriptions from Egypt.

The two inscriptions show that Nabataeans were active in Egypt before the Roman annexation of the Nabataean kingdom in 106 CE. The second inscription anchors the reign of Malichus I more securely and shows that Nabataean merchants and worshippers were operating in a Ptolemaic-Egyptian environment.

== Inscription 1 ==
The first inscription was published by Charles Simon Clermont-Ganneau and later reread by Ernst Littmann and John Strugnell.

The inscription is a dedication to Al-Kutbay, a Nabataean goddess, and refers to a temple or shrine at Tell esh-Shuqafiya. Strugnell suggested that Tell esh-Shuqafiya belonged to a network of shrines on Nabataean trade routes through the eastern Delta.

Strugnell wrote that the inscription does not use royal dating and appears to reflect a local cultic context rather than direct Nabataean political control. He proposed that the site may have had more than one temple or sacred installation, and that the deity worshipped there was closely associated with scribal and possibly Egyptian religious traditions.

== Inscription 2 ==
The second inscription, on a white limestone block, was identified in the collection of the Hariyyat Raznah Museum at Zagazig and first published in 1988 by Jones, Hammond, Johnson, and Fiema. It is also known as TSSI IV 14. The inscription had been recovered from Tell esh-Shuqafiya by the mid-1960s, but its provenance was only loosely recorded.

The second inscription is a dedication to Dushara, the chief Nabataean god, and names him as “the god who is in Daphne,” identified with Tahpanhes. It says that “Wahb-alahi son of Abd-alga son of Aws-alahi” made the quadrangular shrine. The stone is thought to be a shrine block rather than a simple votive plaque, with wording showing both religious and local administrative features.

=== Dates ===
Jones et al read the inscription as a dedication written in Nisan of 36 BCE, synchronised to the 14th year of Cleopatra VII and the 26th year of Malichus I, suggesting that Malichus I began to rule in 63/62 BCE. In 1990, Fiema and Jones published a revised reading of Cleopatra’s regnal year as 18 rather than 14, which placed Malichus I beginning in 59/58 BCE and left room for an otherwise poorly attested Obodas II between Aretas III and Malichus I.

== Bibliography ==
- Jones, Richard N.; Hammond, Philip C.; Johnson, David J.; Fiema, Zbigniew T. (1988). "A Second Nabataean Inscription from Tell esh-Shuqafiya, Egypt". Bulletin of the American Schools of Oriental Research (269): 47–57.
- Fiema, Zbigniew T.; Jones, Richard N. (1990). "The Nabataean King-List Revised: Further Observations on the Second Nabataean Inscription from Tell Esh-Shuqafiya, Egypt" (PDF). Annual of the Department of Antiquities of Jordan. 34: 239–248.
- Strugnell, John (1959). "The Nabataean Goddess Al-Kutba and Her Sanctuaries". Bulletin of the American Schools of Oriental Research (156): 29–36.
- Clermont-Ganneau, Charles (1924). "Les Nabatéens en Égypt". Recueil d'archéologie orientale: 229–257.
