= Chuldu =

1st-century CE queen of the Nabataeans

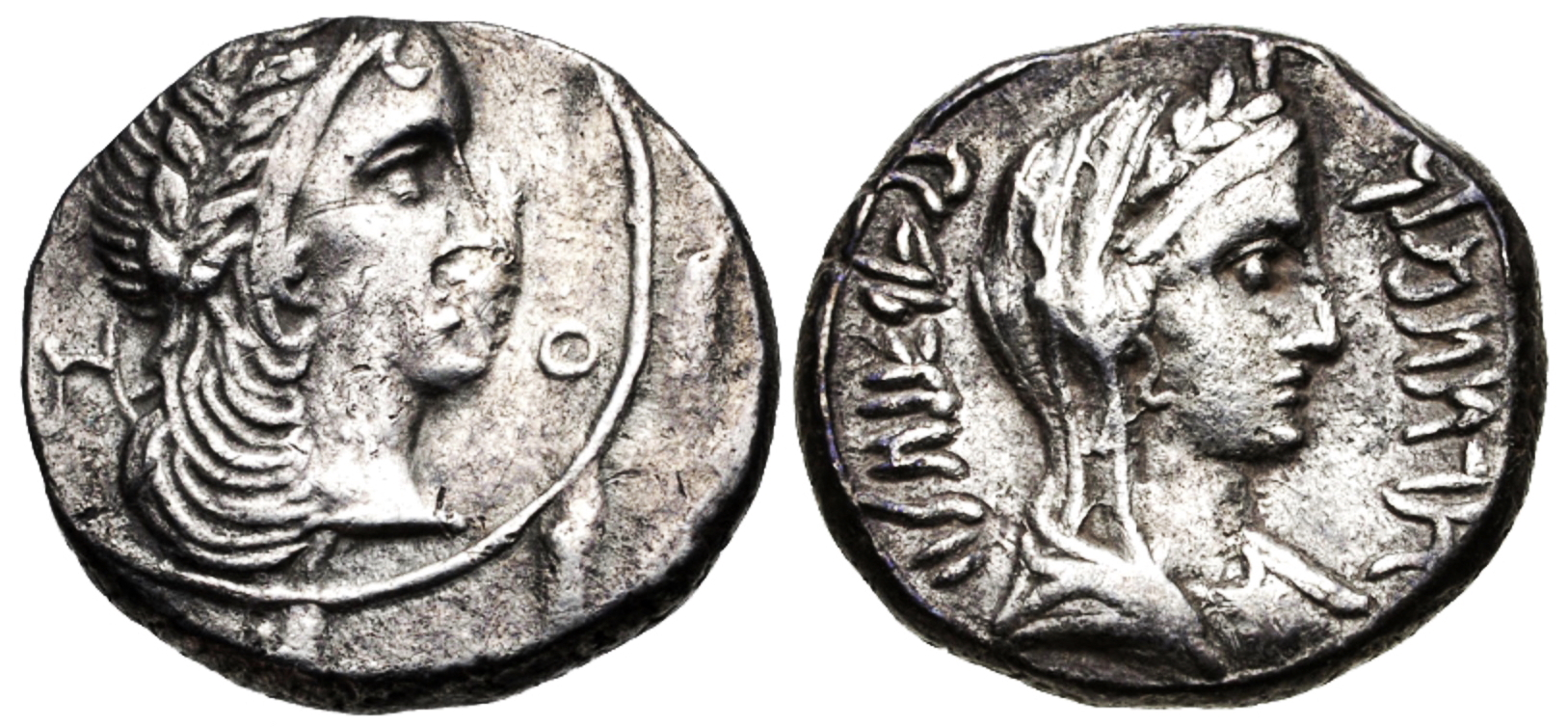
Silver drachm of Aretas IV with his wife Huldu

Chuldu, Huldu, or Khuld (Nabataean Aramaic: 𐢊𐢑𐢅𐢈, romanized: Ḥūldū; fl. 1st-century CE), was a Queen of the Nabataeans, spouse and co-ruler of Aretas IV in 9 BC–AD 16. Her name as transcribed in Arabic is خلدو, Ḵuldū.

She ruled jointly with her husband from 9 BCE until 16 CE. Copper and silver coins where she is depicted with her husband have been recovered. Little is known about the exact date and reason of the transition from Chuldu to Shaqilath, who appears on coins after an unexplained gap in 18 CE. Maurice Satre suggested previous gaps in the minting of coins could have been due to a period of capitulation to Ancient Rome.

She has been presumed to be the mother of Malichus II, Obodas and Rabbel, and of three daughters, Phasa'el (first wife of Herod Antipas), Shu'dat and Hagera. The latter also had a son, also called Aretas, grandson of Aretas IV.

== See also ==
- List of rulers of Nabatea
