= Petra Pool and Garden Complex =

Formal garden and pool complex in the Southern Terrace area of Petra

Coordinates: 30°19′44″N 35°26′33″E

Petra Garden and Pool Complex
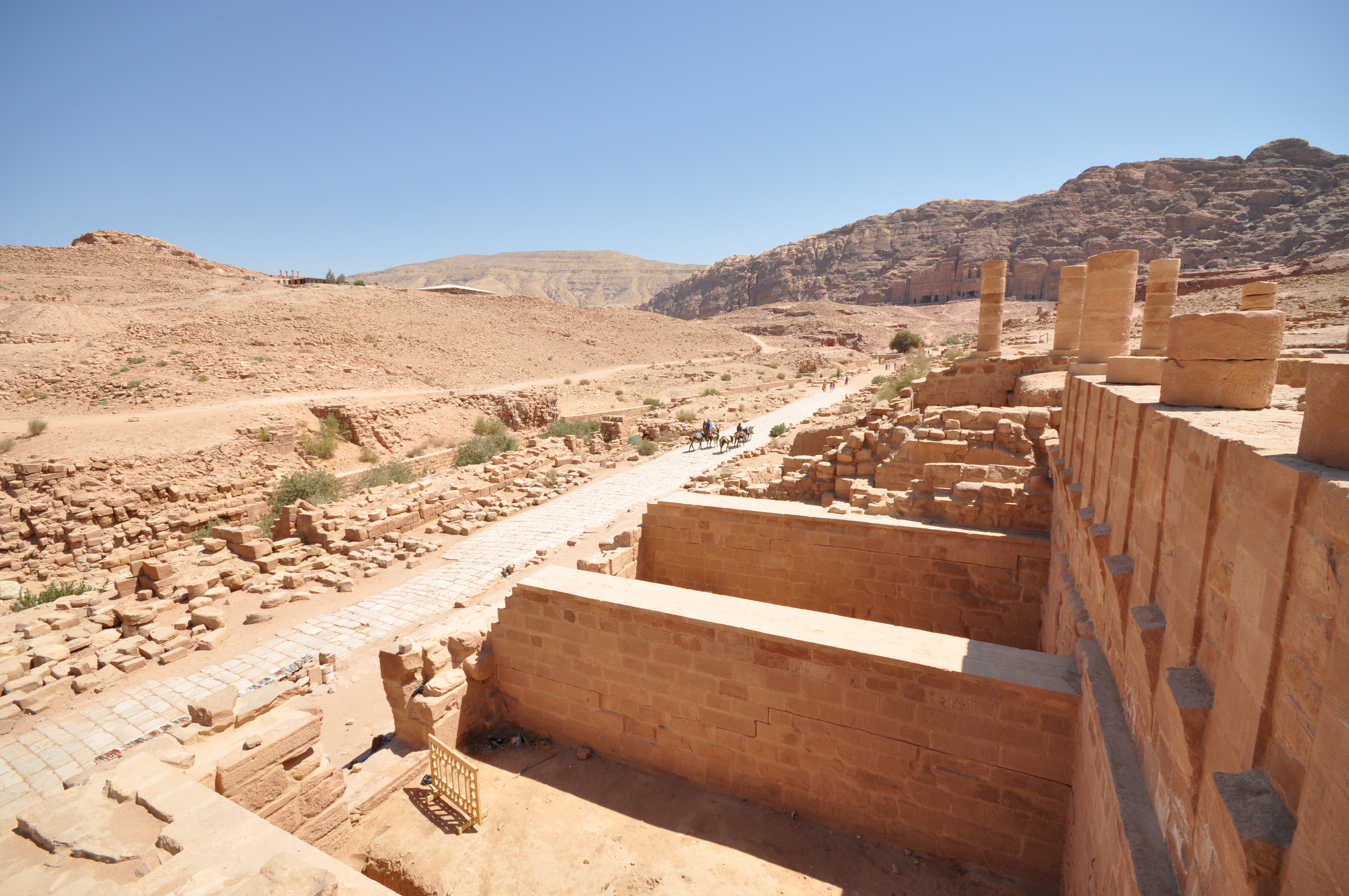
- Ornamental Garden and Pool Complex
- Interactive map of Petra Garden and Pool Complex
- Type: Garden and Pool Complex
- Location: Petra, Jordan

History
- Built by: Nabataean king Aretas IV (9 BCE-40 CE)

Site notes
- Area: 65 x 85 meters (terraces)
- Volume: Over 2000 cubic meters (pool)
- Excavation dates: 1998-present
- Archaeologists: Leigh-Ann Bedal
- Condition: Ruins

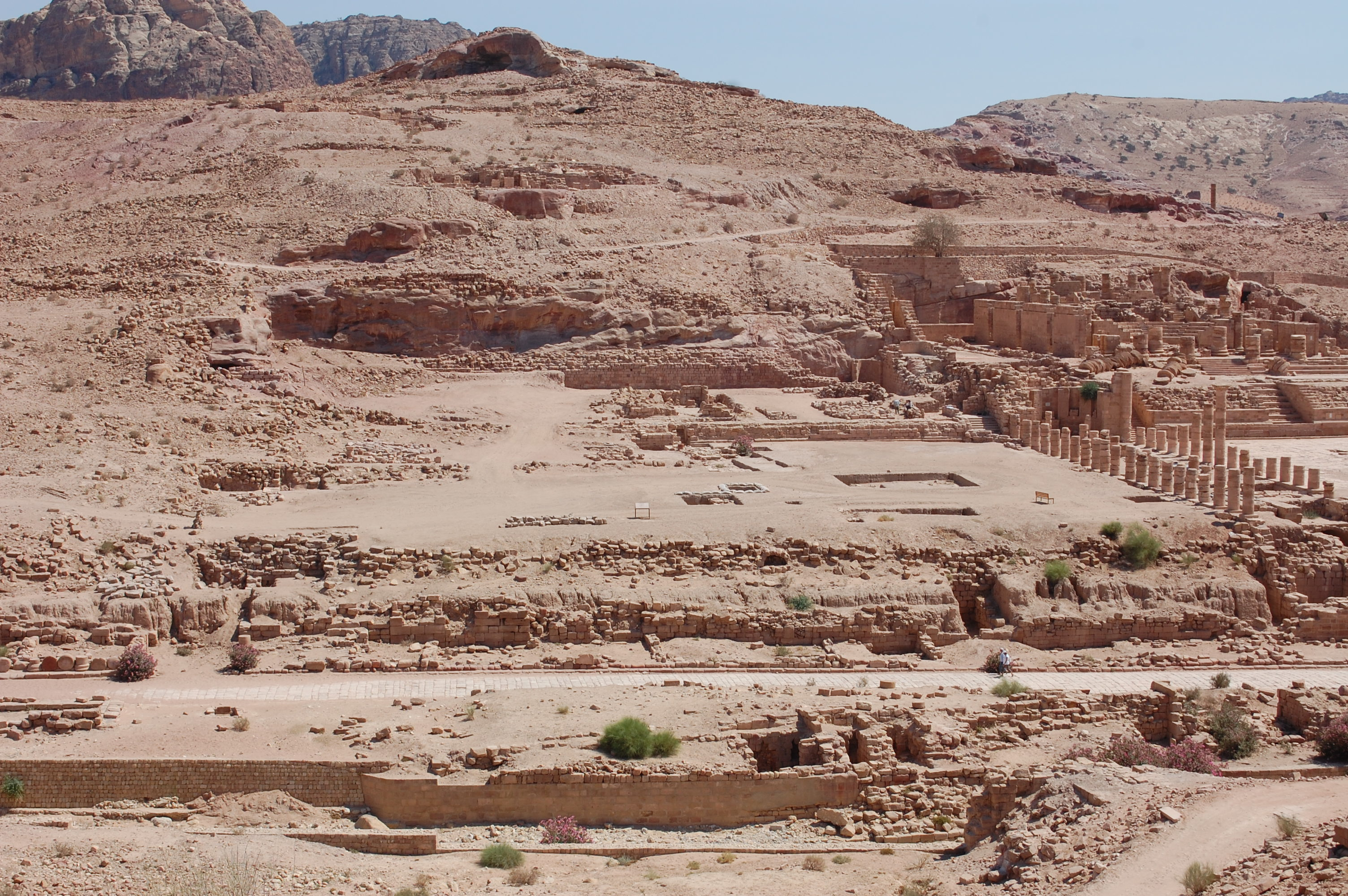

The Petra Garden and Pool Complex is a name given to a series of structures within the center of the city of Petra. Originally said to be a market area, excavations at the site have allowed scholars to identify it as an elaborate Nabataean garden, which included a large swimming pool, an island-pavilion, and an intricate hydraulic system. This is the only known example of such a structure at Petra, or at other Nabataean sites in the region, and has therefore featured prominently in discussions about the wealth of elites at Petra and the role of water in displaying power and prestige. While other structures, such as the nearby Nymphaeum, also require water management infrastructure, the Petra Garden and Pool Complex is unique in its combination of hydrology, exotic vegetation, and architecture.

== Location and purpose ==
The complex is located along the main colonnaded street in the center of Petra, between the Great Temple and the so-called "Middle Market.” Its location indicates the importance of the structure in local civic life. It is difficult to know how this complex functioned in relation to the Great Temple and other adjacent structures because the purpose of nearby buildings also remains unclear.

== Description ==
The Garden-Pool complex is situated on a series of large terraces measuring 65 x 85 meters. Excavations and botanical study have shown that these terraces may have had a large ornamental garden on them. The garden was bisected by walkways and smaller structures. Further back from the ornamental garden with respect to the colonnaded street lay a pool measuring 43 x 23 meters in length and width and 2.5 meters in depth. Archaeologists have calculated that this pool would have been able to hold over 2000 cubic meters of water. In the center of the pool stood a pavilion on a sandstone pedestal. Fragments from this structure and others reveal that the whole complex was likely painted in dark red, orange, and bright blue, which, in combination with the water and exotic vegetation, would have created an awe-inspiring sight for visitors entering the city from the surrounding desert. Behind the entire structure is a 16-meter-high cliff face, which bears signs of hydrological modification likely used to channel water to the complex and to create cascading water effects.

== History ==
Based on excavations, the complex appears to have been built during the reign of the Nabataean king, Aretas IV (9 BCE-40 CE) and remained in use throughout the Roman annexation of the city in 106 CE. Archaeologists have identified at least nine distinct phases for the site. These include early periods of occupation, construction, and renovation, followed by abandonment of the complex sometime in the late second to third century CE. By the time of the earthquake of 363 CE, the complex was already out of use and suffered major damage. There is evidence that the site was then used for agricultural purposes for much of the late Byzantine period and seems to have continued to serve this function up until the middle of the 20th century

== History of study ==
Prior to excavation, the area of the Petra Garden and Pool Complex was believed to be one of three markets at Petra, due to the fact that it was open and flat and the lack of standing architecture. Excavations of the site began in 1998, directed by Leigh-Ann Bedal (Penn State Erie, The Behrend College) who quickly discovered evidence of complex hydraulic management, exotic plants, and a large swimming pool. Subsequent excavations took place over the course of eight seasons, with ongoing study of the botanical remains.
