= Petra Theater =

First-century AD Nabatean theatre in modern-day Jordan

Petra Theater (Arabic: مسرح البتراء) is a first century AD Nabataean theatre situated 600 m from the centre of Petra. Substantial part of the theater was carved out of solid rock, while the scaena and exterior wall were constructed. The theater's auditorium consists of three horizontal sections of seats separated by passageways and seven stairways to ascend. The theater could accommodate a number of approximately 8500 people, more than the estimated number of Amman theater. Petra Theater follows similar architectural patterns of Ancient Greek and Roman theaters, which enhances superior acoustics.

== History ==
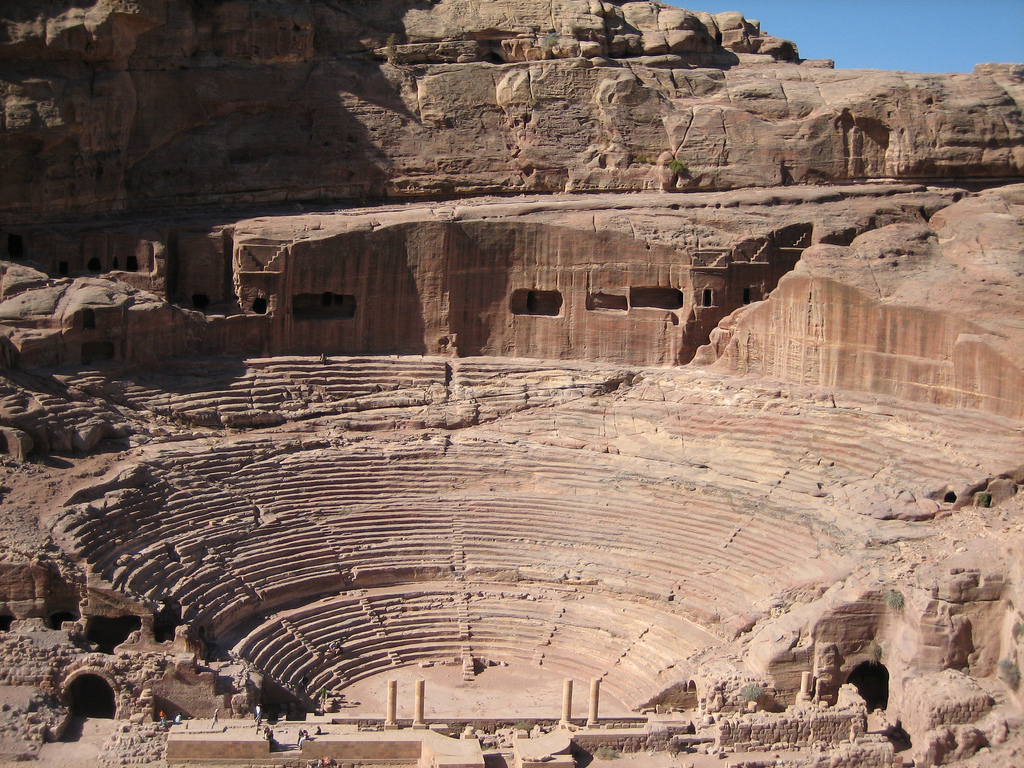
General view of the theater

The theater was built in the cultural and political apex of the Nabataean kingdom under Aretas IV (9 BC–40 AD), where large scale civic construction projects in Petra and other important Nabataean trading cities in Hijaz and the Negev took place. It is said that the theater-building activities of Herod the Great may have urged the Nabataean king to follow lead. The massive theater with its large capacity was positioned to bring the greatest number of tombs within view.

Although similar to Ancient Greek theatres in design, being carved out opposed to being built is characteristically distinctive Nabataean style and not a Greek manner. The floral capitals of the theater are also distinctively Nabataean artistic element. Minor alterations of the theater were made by Aretas son Malichus II and later on the Romans who re-built the exterior wall.

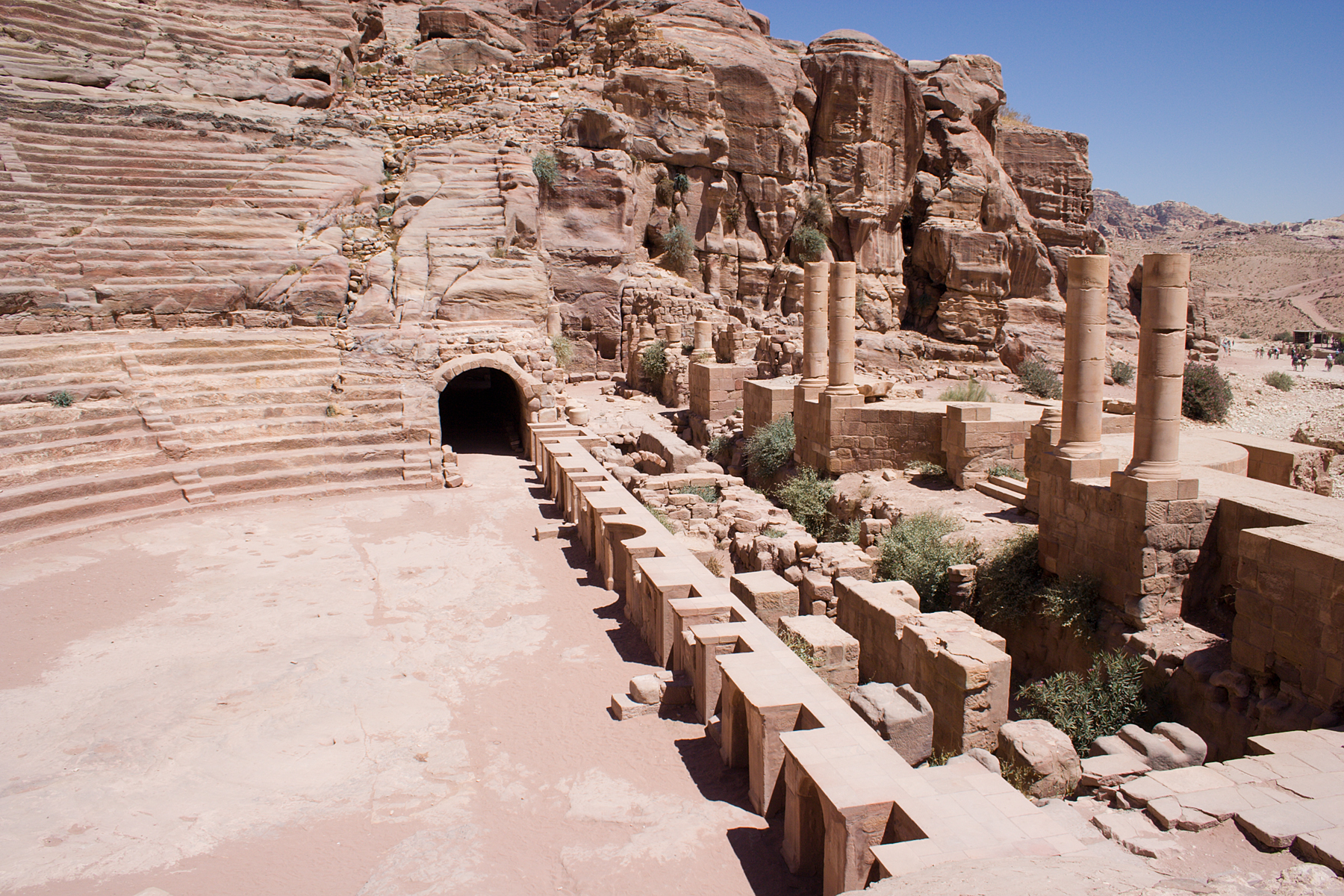
The theater stage

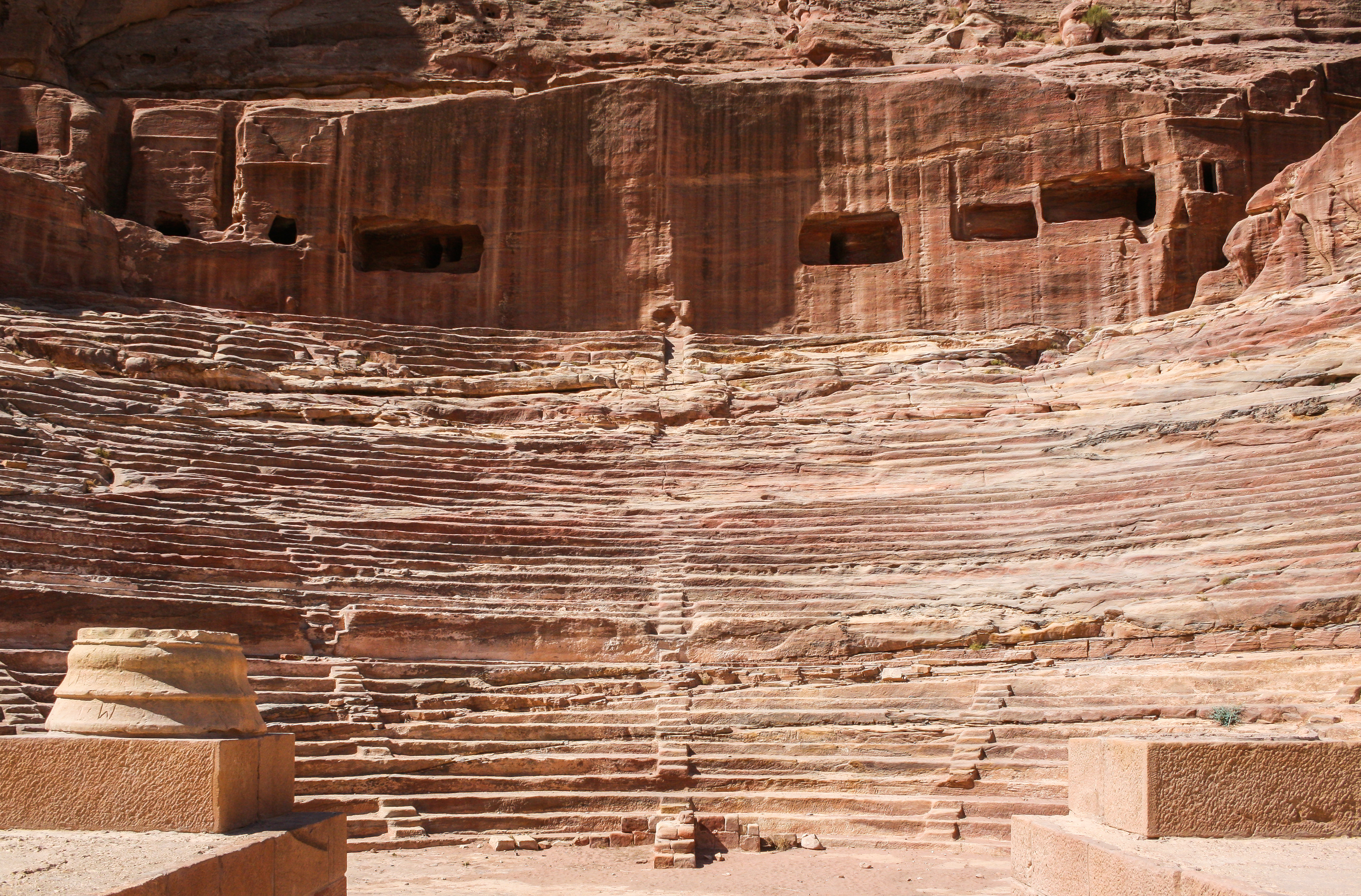
Closer view

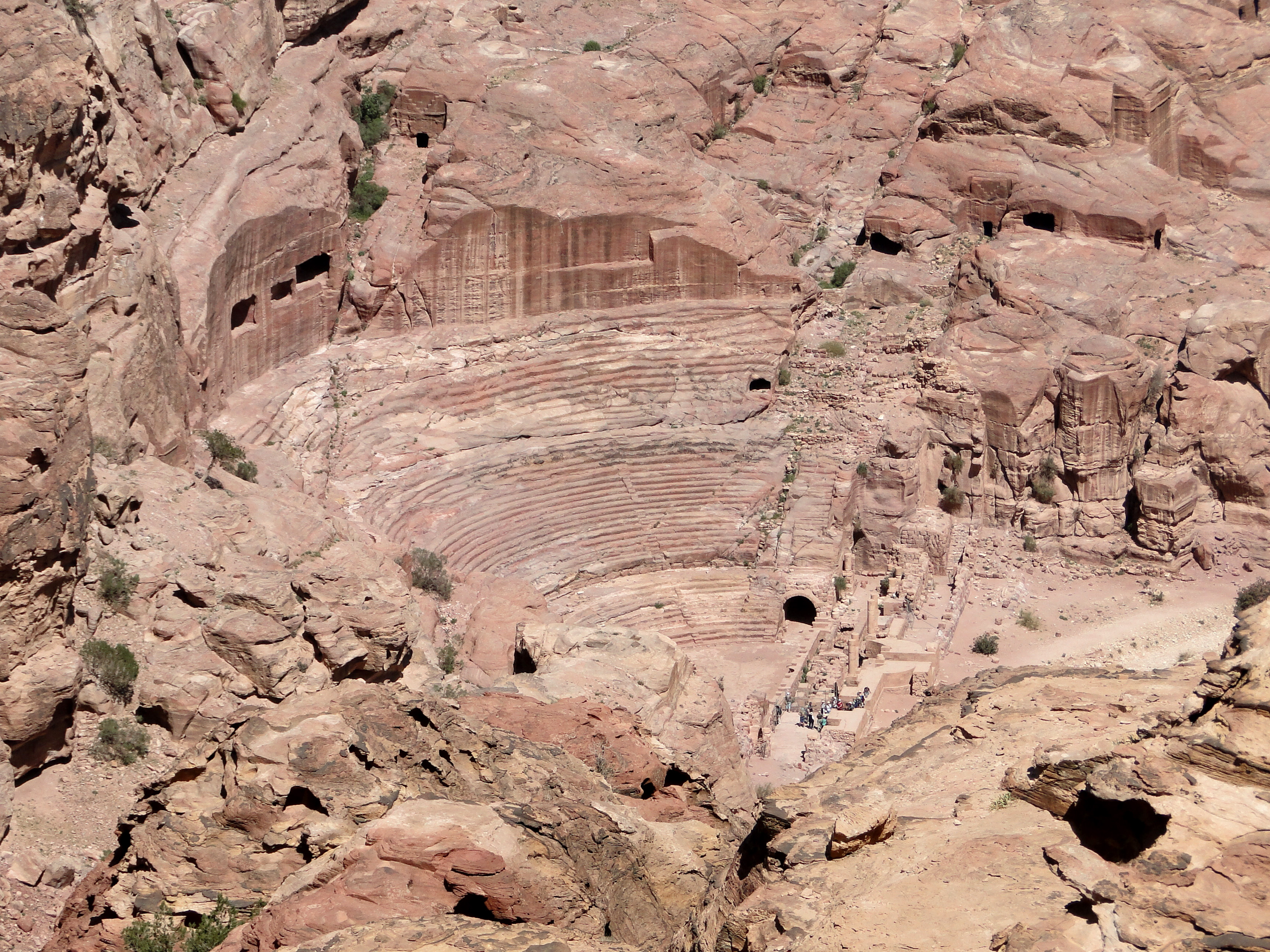
Aerial photo of the theater

== See also ==
- Petra
- Amphitheatre
- Nabataean architecture
