= Al-Kutbay =

Arabian deity - the scribe

Al-Kutba' (Arabic: الكتبي) was a north Arabian deity of uncertain gender. The name means, roughly, "the scribe"; it comes from the Semitic root K-T-B which means 'to write.'

Kutba' is represented as a betyl in Wadi Rum alongside al-'Uzza. The gender of this god is disputed. Because of the god's name originating from the root word K-T-B or "to write", it is considered that Kutba' was a god of intellect including writing.

Nabataeans and other mercantile Arab tribes brought the worship of al-Kutbay from Petra in Jordan to Egypt. A temple to the god has been discovered at Qasr Gheit, built in characteristic Egyptian style. An altar-base in this temple, is inscribed with the Nabataean dedication: "from Hawyru son of Geram to al-Kutbay."

In the Hellenistic era, al-Kutbay was associated with Hermes and Mercury.

== Inscriptions ==
- Tell esh-Shuqafiya Nabataean inscriptions
- A carving at the foot of Jebal Rumm in Jordan, discovered in 1959 by J. Strugell
- Wadi Es Siyyagh, on the way to the main spring of Petra contains the phrase "in front of Kutbay, this very god."

Other sites around Arabia contain inscriptions dedicated to this deity.
