= Shaqilath II =

1st-century AD queen of the Nabataeans

Shaqilath II (Nabataean Aramaic: 𐢝𐢚𐢍𐢑𐢞, romanized: šqylt; fl. 70), was a queen of the Nabataeans. Her name as transcribed in Arabic is شقيلة Šaqīla,

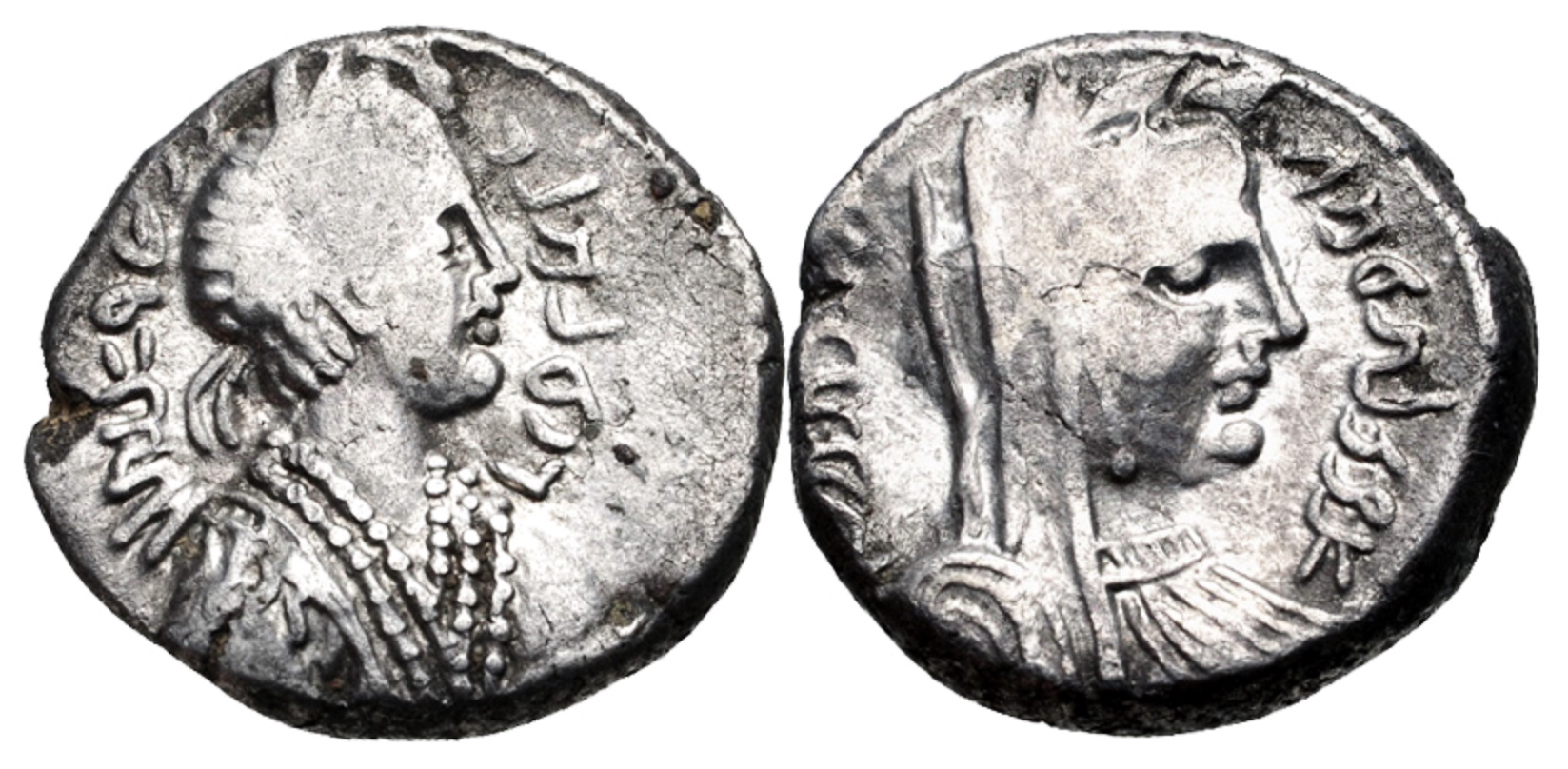
Silver drachma of Rabbel II with his mother Shaqilath II

She was the daughter of Aretas IV of the Nabataeans and his second wife Shaqilath. She ruled jointly with her half-brother and husband Malichus II in 40–70. After his death she was regent for her son Rabel II in 70–76 AD. Copper and silver coins where she is depicted with her husband, and coins of her with her son, have been recovered. Some of these coins are dated with regnal years to the left of the queen.

== See also ==
- List of rulers of Nabatea
- Shaqilath
