= Rabbel II Soter =

King of the Nabataean Kingdom (ruled AD 70-106)

- King of the Nabataean Kingdom
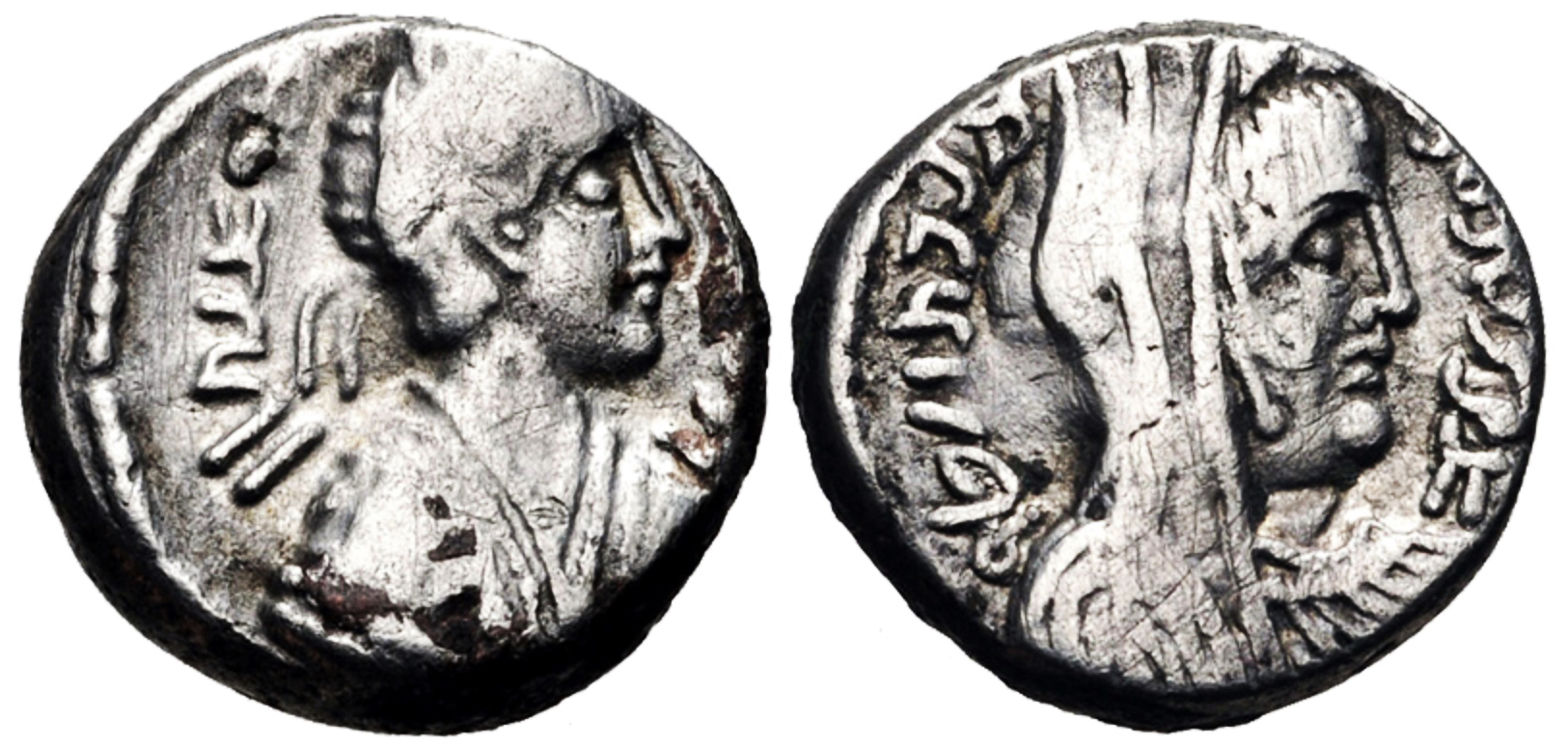
- Silver drachm of Rabbel II with Shaqilat II
- Reign: 70-106 AD
- Predecessor: Malichus II
- Successor: Nabataean Kingdom conquered by Trajan
- Regent: Shaqilath II (70-76 AD)
- Died: 106 AD
- Spouses: Queen Gamilath (76-102 AD); Queen Hagaru (102-106 AD)

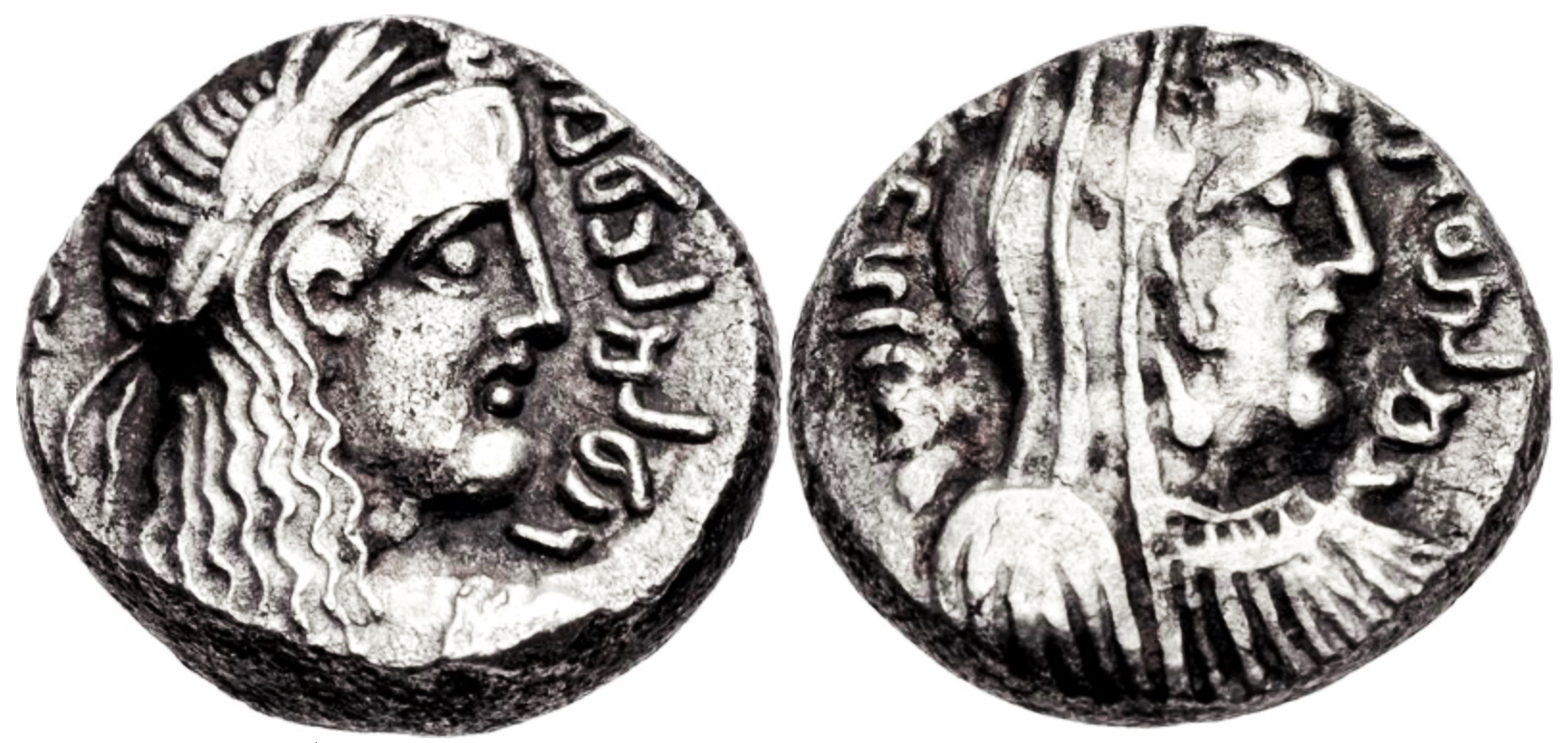
Silver drachm of Rabbel II with Gamilat

Rabbel II Soter (Nabataean Aramaic: 𐢛𐢃𐢁𐢐 𐢅𐢌 𐢁𐢊𐢍𐢌 𐢈𐢝𐢍𐢉𐢂 𐢗𐢓𐢆, romanized: Rabʾēl dī ʾaḥyēy wa-šēzīb ʿammeh, "Rabbel, who gave life and deliverance to his people") was the last ruler of the Nabataean Kingdom, ruling from 70 to 106. His name as transcribed in Arabic is رب أيل Rabb ʾayl.

After the death of his father, Malichus II, Rabbel still a child, ascended to the throne. His mother, Shaqilath II, assumed the regency of the Nabataean Kingdom, during the minority of her son Rabel II in 70-76 AD. His sister Gamilath became queen of the Nabataeans. Rabbel gave himself the Greek title "Soter", meaning "Savior". He reigned with his first wife Queen Gamilath and his second wife Queen Hagaru. Gamilat was a queen in 76–102 AD and Hagru was a queen in 102–106.

After his death in 106, the Roman emperor Trajan faced practically no resistance and conquered the kingdom on 22 March 106. It became the Roman province of Arabia Petraea, with Bosra becoming its provincial capital.

== See also ==
- List of rulers of Nabatea

== Sources ==
- Taylor, Jane: Petra And the Lost Kingdom of the Nabataeans. I. B. Tauris 2001, ISBN 1860645089, p. 73-74 (online copy, p. 73, at Google Books)
