= Hasmonean civil war =

Civil war between two claimants to the Hasmonean Jewish Crown

- Part of the Pharisee–Sadducee conflict
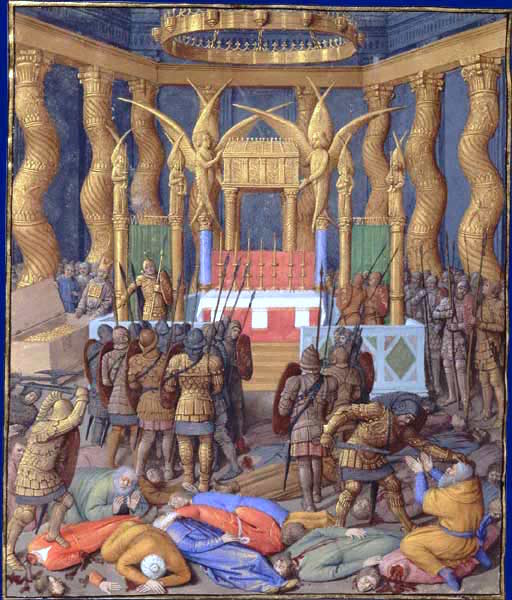
- Pompey in the Temple of Jerusalem, Jean Fouquet (1470–1475)
Date	67–63 BCE
Location	Hasmonean Judea
Result	Roman victory

Belligerents
Aristobulus supporters: Sadducees; Mercenaries	Hyrcanus supporters: Pharisees; Nabataean kingdom	Roman Republic

Commanders and leaders
Aristobulus II	Hyrcanus II; Antipater; Aretas III	Pompey the Great; Marcus Aemilius Scaurus

Strength
Unknown	Unknown number of Hyrcanus loyalists (over 6,000); 50,000 Nabataean infantry and cavalry troops	Unknown

Casualties and losses
Over 12,000 killed (Including many civilians)	Over 6,000 killed	18,700 killed

The Hasmonean civil war was a succession war fought in Judea between Salome Alexandra's sons, Hyrcanus II and Aristobulus II, over the Hasmonean crown. What began as a civil war, Hyrcanus backed by Antipater and Nabataean king Aretas III, Aristobulus holding Jerusalem, drew in the Roman Republic when Pompey intervened, besieged the Temple precincts in 63 BCE, and captured Jerusalem. Pompey reinstated Hyrcanus as high priest but stripped royal power, reduced Judea's territory, imposed tribute, and carried Aristobulus to Rome, ending the independence of Judea.

== Background ==
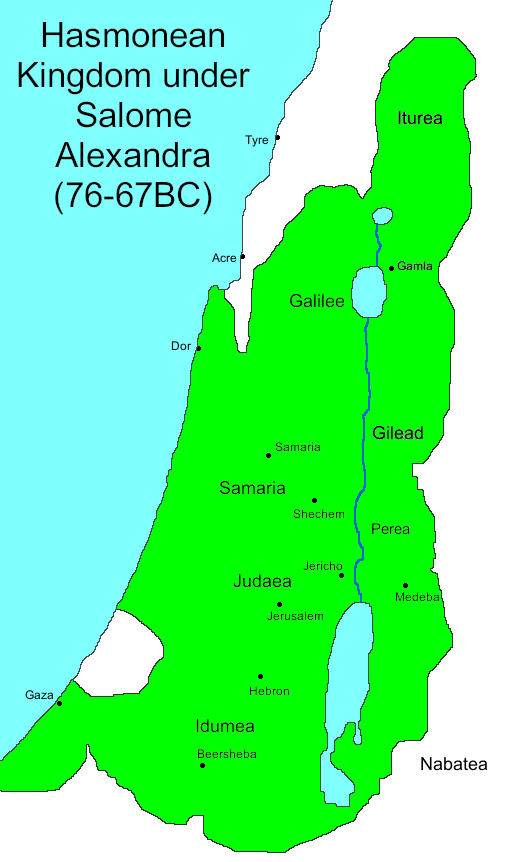
Hasmonean Kingdom under Salome Alexandra

The Hasmonean Dynasty had been established after the Maccabean Revolt and had gained independence from the Seleucid Empire, after which it became a powerful regional kingdom. The kingdom reached its greatest extent during the reigns of Alexander Jannaeus and Salome Alexandra, who had two sons, Hyrcanus and Aristobulus. Hyrcanus, the elder son, was not as popular with the people and mostly sided with the Pharisees, while his younger brother Aristobulus was very ambitious and popular and tended to side with the Sadducees. For this reason, Aristobulus began making connections with military officials and owners of bastions even during his mother's lifetime.

== Early stages ==
=== Brothers prepare for conflict ===
Alexandra was very sick at the end of her days and Aristobulus began using his connections to take over the walled cities and bastions of the Hasmonean realm and used the money he found there to further hire mercenaries and declared himself king when she was still alive. Alexandra, who favored her elder son Hyrcanus, ordered the jailing of Aristobulus' wife and sons in the Antonia Keep in Jerusalem, to the north of the Temple Mount. She died shortly after, following which Hyrcanus was crowned King of Judea.

The two brothers' forces engaged nearby Jericho, in which many of Hyrcanus' men joined Aristobulus, after that Hyrcanus quickly escaped to the Antonia Keep where his brother's family was being held. However, eventually after negotiations the brother made peace and Hyrcanus abdicated the throne to Aristobulus, who ensured Hyrcanus' safety.

=== Nabataean involvement ===
Antipater the Idumean, a rich Idumean and an influential person in the Judean politics strongly disliked Aristobulus and preferred Hyrcanus as king. He convinced Hyrcanus to fight for the crown, and spoke to Aretas III, king of the Nabataeans, about the great qualities of Hyrcanus and his birthright and convinced him to support him. One night, Hyrcanus escaped and traveled to Petra, capital of the Nabataeans, where he gave many gifts to please Aretas. He made a deal with Aretas, offering to return to Nabataea 12 cities that had been taken from them by his father Alexander Jannaeus.

Aretas gave Hyrcanus 50,000 cavalrymen and infantrymen. Aretas' men began advancing towards Jerusalem, defeating Aristobulus' forces. Some switched sides and joined Hyrcanus' army. Aristobulus fell back to Jerusalem, which was laid under siege at Passover of that year.

== Roman involvement ==
=== Negotiations with Scaurus ===
Pompey sent Marcus Aemilius Scaurus to Syria while Pompey fought against Armenia. The two brothers sent messengers to Scaurus trying to convince him to align with them, but the 300 talents of silver (or 400) sent to him by Aristobulus as well as the fact that Jerusalem would be too hard to breach, persuaded him to fight against Hyrcanus and Aretas. This led to Aretas departing leaving Hyrcanus without Nabatean support. Following the departure of Aretas, Aristobulus led his army against Hyrcanus and they engaged in a battle at Papiron and killed 6,000 of them, including Phalion, brother of Antipater. Scaurus left Judea after those events.

=== Negotiations with Pompey ===
After his war in Armenia, Pompey arrived in Syria and received a gift of 500 talents of Gold from Aristobulus. Again, both parties sent messengers to Pompey, Antipater on behalf of Hyrcanus and a man called Nikodemus on behalf of Aristobulus. Other messengers, this time on behalf of the people, begged for Pompey to end the rule of Kings over the land. After Pompey realized Rome could better manipulate Hyrcanus, he sided with him and took the Roman forces in Syria against Aristobulus. Aristobulus was in the fortress of Alexandrian, which is on top of a mountain, and when Pompey arrived, he spoke several times with him, negotiating, in which Pompey told Aristobulus to call for all his men to leave the fortress, and which they did so, however he regretted those actions and escaped to Jerusalem.

=== Siege of Jerusalem ===
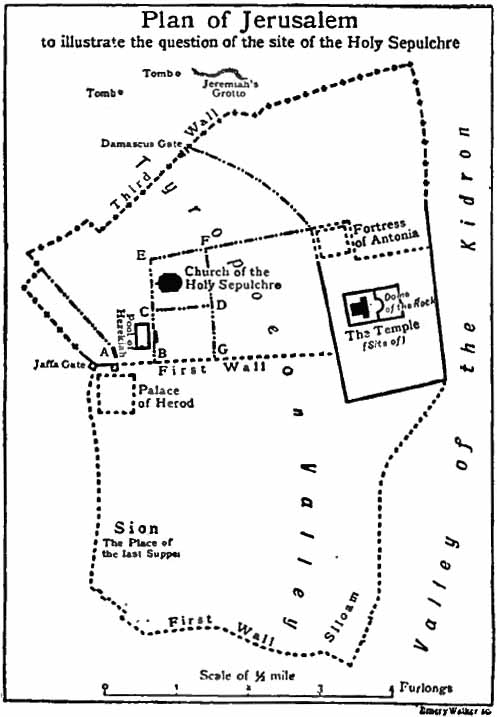
Plan of Jerusalem

When Pompey arrived in Jerusalem, he surveyed the city:

for he saw the walls were so firm, that it would be hard to overcome them; and that the valley before the walls was terrible; and that the temple, which was within that valley, was itself encompassed with a very strong wall, insomuch that if the city were taken, that temple would be a second place of refuge for the enemy to retire to.

— Josephus, The Wars of the Jews 1:141

Fortunately for Pompey, Hyrcanus II still had supporters in the city. They opened a gate, probably situated in the northwestern part of the city wall, and let the Romans in. This allowed Pompey to take hold of Jerusalem's upper city, including the Royal Palace, while Aristobulus' party held the eastern portions of the city—the Temple Mount and the City of David. The Jews consolidated their hold by breaking down the bridge over the Tyropoeon Valley connecting the upper city with the Temple Mount. Pompey offered them the chance to surrender, but when they refused, he began prosecuting the siege with vigour. Pompey had his forces construct a wall of circumvallation around the areas held by the Jews and then pitched his camp within the wall, to the north of the Temple. Here stood a saddle allowing access to Temple, and it was therefore guarded by the citadel known as the Baris, augmented by a ditch. A second camp was erected south-east of the Temple.

The troops then set about filling the ditch protecting the northern part of the Temple enclosure and building two ramparts, one next to the Baris and the other on the west, while the defenders, from their superior position, sought to hinder Roman efforts. When the banks were complete, Pompey erected siege towers and brought up siege engines and battering rams from Tyre. Under the protection of slingers driving the defenders from the walls, these began to batter the walls surrounding the Temple. After three months, Pompey's troops finally managed to capture one of the Baris' towers and were able to enter the Temple precinct, both from the citadel and from the west. First over the wall was Faustus Cornelius Sulla, son of the former Roman dictator and a senior officer in Pompey's army. He was followed by two centurions, Furius and Fabius, each leading a cohort, and the Romans soon overcame the defending Jews. 12,000 were slaughtered, while only a few Romans troops were killed.

Pompey himself entered the Temple's Holy of Holies which only the High Priest was allowed to enter, thereby desecrating it. He did not remove anything, neither its treasures nor any funds, and the next day ordered the Temple cleansed and its rituals resumed. Pompey then headed back to Rome, taking Aristobulus with him for his triumphal procession.

== Aftermath ==
The siege and conquest of Jerusalem was a disaster for the Hasmonean kingdom. Pompey reinstated Hyrcanus II as the High Priest but stripped him of his royal title, though Rome recognized him as an ethnarch in 47 BC. Judea remained autonomous but was obliged to pay tribute and dependent on the Roman administration in Syria. The kingdom was dismembered; it was forced to relinquish the coastal plain, depriving it of access to the Mediterranean, as well as parts of Idumea and Samaria. Several Hellenistic cities were granted autonomy to form the Decapolis, leaving the state greatly diminished.

== Ancient sources ==
Josephus, Wars of the Jews, Book 1, Chapters 5-7 Josephus, Antiquities of the Jews, Book 14, Chapters 1-15

== See also ==
- List of conflicts in the Near East
- List of Jewish civil wars
