= Poseidippus =

Poseidippus or Posidippus (Ancient Greek: Ποσείδιππος, romanized: Poseidippos or Ancient Greek: Ποσίδιππος, romanized: Posidippos, lit. 'horse of Poseidon') is a Greek theophoric name. It may refer to a number of individuals from classical antiquity, including:

- Poseidippus or Posidippus (comic poet), c. 316–250 BC, a celebrated poet of the New Comedy at Athens, known for his novel use of language, and influence on the Latin poets.
- Poseidippus or Posidippus of Pella, c. 310–240 BC, an epigrammatic poet at Samos and Alexandria, some of whose poems are included in the Greek Anthology.
- Poseidippus, a historian who wrote about Cnidus, and whose work discusses the Venus of Praxiteles. He may be identical with the epigrammatist.
- Poseidippus, a priest of Persephone at Pella.
- Poseidippus, son of Eupolis, stephanophorus (chief magistrate) of Miletus during the reign of Seleucus I.

== Bibliography ==
- Dictionary of Greek and Roman Biography and Mythology, William Smith, ed., Little, Brown and Company, Boston (1849).
- J.J.E. Hondius et al., Supplementum Epigraphicum Graecum (Greek Epigraphical Supplement), Brill, Leiden (1923–present).
- John D. Grainger, A Seleukid Prosopography and Gazetteer, Brill, Leiden, New York, and Cologne (1997) ISBN 90-04-09630-2.
- Michael B. Cosmopoulos, Greek Mysteries: The Archaeology of Ancient Greek Secret Cults, Routledge, London and New York (2003) ISBN 0-415-24873-6.
