= K-T-B =

Root of a number of Semitic words

K-T-B (Hebrew: כ־ת־ב; Arabic: ك-ت-ب) is a triconsonantal root of a number of Semitic words, typically those having to do with writing.

The words for "office", "writer" and "record" all reflect this root. Most notably, the Arabic word kitab ("book") is also used in a number of Semitic and Indo-Iranian languages, as well as Turkish. One cultural example would be the Mishnaic expression Katuv or the cognate Arabic expression transliterated as Maktoub, which may be translated as "it is written". Another would be the Kutubiyya Mosque of Marrakesh, whose name is taken from the librarians and booksellers who once occupied that area.

== Arabic derivatives ==
A full account of derivatives could be extensive, but some of them are these:

kataba كَتَبَ or كتب "he wrote" (masculine)
katabat كَتَبَت or كتبت "she wrote" (feminine)
katabtu كَتَبْتُ or كتبت "I wrote" (f and m)
kutiba كُتِبَ or كتب "it was written" (masculine)
kutibat كُتِبَت or كتبت "it was written" (feminine)
katabū كَتَبُوا or كتبوا "they wrote" (masculine)
katabna كَتَبْنَ or كتبن "they wrote" (feminine)
katabnā كَتَبْنَا or كتبنا "we wrote" (f and m)
yaktub(u) يَكْتُب or يكتب "he writes" (masculine)
taktub(u) تَكْتُب or تكتب "she writes" (feminine)
naktub(u) نَكْتُب or نكتب "we write" (f and m)
aktub(u) أَكْتُب or أكتب "I write" (f and m)
yuktab(u) يُكْتَب or يكتب "being written" (masculine)
tuktab(u) تُكتَب or تكتب "being written" (feminine)
yaktubūn(a) يَكْتُبُونَ or يكتبون "they write" (masculine)
yaktubna يَكْتُبْنَ or يكتبن "they write" (feminine)
taktubna تَكْتُبْنَ or تكتبن "you write" (feminine)
yaktubān(i) يَكْتُبَانِ or يكتبان "they both write" (masculine) (for 2 males)
taktubān(i) تَكْتُبَانِ or تكتبان "they both write" (feminine) (for 2 females)
kātaba كَاتَبَ or كاتب "he exchanged letters (with sb.)"
yukātib(u) يُكَاتِبُ "he exchanges (with sb.)"
yatakātabūn(a) يَتَكَاتَبُونَ or يتكاتبون "they write to each other" (masculine)
iktataba اِكْتَتَبَ or اكتتب "he is registered" (intransitive) or "he contributed (a money quantity to sth.)" (ditransitive) (the first t is part of a particular verbal transfix, not part of the root)
istaktaba اِسْتَكْتَبَ or استكتب "to cause to write (sth.)"
kitāb كِتَاب or كتاب "book" (the hyphen shows end of stem before various case endings)
kutub كُتُب or كتب "books" (plural)
kutayyib كُتَيِّب or كتيب "booklet" (diminutive)
kitābat كِتَابَة or كتابة "writing"
kātib كاتِب or كاتب "writer" (masculine)
kātibat كاتِبة or كاتبة "writer" (feminine)
kātibūn(a) كاتِبونَ or كاتبون "writers" (masculine)
kātibāt كاتِبات or كاتبات "writers" (feminine)
kuttāb كُتاب or كتاب "writers" (broken plural)
katabat كَتَبَة or كتبة "clerks" (broken plural)
maktab مَكتَب or مكتب "desk" or "office"
makātib مَكاتِب or مكاتب "desks" or "offices"
maktabat مَكتَبة or مكتبة "library" or "bookshop"
maktūb مَكتوب or مكتوب "written" (participle) or "postal letter" (noun)
katībat كَتيبة or كتيبة "squadron" or "document"
katā’ib كَتائِب or كتائب "squadrons" or "documents"
iktitāb اِكتِتاب or اكتتاب "registration" or "contribution of funds"
muktatib مُكتَتِب or مكتتب "subscriber"
muktatab مكتتب or مكتاتب is "subscription"
istiktāb اِستِكتاب or استكتاب "causing to write"

== Hebrew derivatives ==
The same root is present in Hebrew:

kāṯaḇti כתבתי "I wrote"
kāṯaḇtā כתבת "you (m) wrote"
kāṯaḇ כתב "he wrote"
kattāḇ כתב "reporter" (m)
katteḇeṯ כתבת "reporter" (f)
kattāḇā כתבה "article" (plural kattāḇōṯ כתבות)
miḵtāḇ מכתב "postal letter" (plural miḵtāḇīm מכתבים)
miḵtāḇā מכתבה "writing desk" (plural miḵtāḇōṯ מכתבות)
kəṯōḇeṯ כתובת "address" (plural kəṯōḇōṯ כתובות)
kəṯāḇ כתב "handwriting"
kāṯūḇ כתוב "written" (f kəṯūḇā כתובה)
hiḵtīḇ הכתיב "he dictated" (f hiḵtīḇā הכתיבה)
hiṯkattēḇ התכתב "he corresponded (f hiṯkattəḇā התכתבה)
niḵtaḇ נכתב "it was written" (m)
niḵtəḇā נכתבה "it was written" (f)
kəṯīḇ כתיב "spelling" (m)
taḵtīḇ תכתיב "prescript" (m)
məḵuttāḇ מכותב "addressee" (meḵutteḇeṯ מכותבת f)
kəṯubbā כתובה "ketubah (a Jewish marriage contract)" (f)

The Hebrew fricatives transcribed as "ḵ" and "ḇ" can also be transcribed in a number of other ways, such as "ch" and "v", which are pronounced [χ] and [v], respectively. They are transliterated "ḵ" and "ḇ" on this page to retain the connection with the pure consonantal root k-t-b. Also in Modern Hebrew, there is no gemination. In Hebrew, the root is used with the meaning of 'writing' but not for the noun for 'book', which is sefer.

== Contrastive Hebrew-Arabic ==
A contrastive presentation of part of this can be as follows:

Semitological abbreviation	Hebrew name	Arabic name	Morphological category	Hebrew Form	Arabic form	Approximate translation
G verb stem	Pa‘al (or Qal)	fa‘ala فَعَلَ (Stem I)	3rd. masc. sing perfect	kataḇ כתב	kataba كتب	"he wrote"
G verb stem	Pa‘al (or Qal)	fa‘ala فَعَلَ (Stem I)	1st. plur. perfect	kataḇnu כתבנו	katabnā كتبنا	"we wrote"
G verb stem	Pa‘al (or Qal)	fa‘ala فَعَلَ (Stem I)	3rd. masc. sing. imperfect	yiḵtoḇ יכתוב	yaktubu يكتب	"he writes, will write"
G verb stem	Pa‘al (or Qal)	fa‘ala فَعَلَ (Stem I)	1st. plur. imperfect	niḵtoḇ נכתוב	naktubu نكتب	"we write, will write"
G verb stem	Pa‘al (or Qal)	fa‘ala فَعَلَ (Stem I)	masc. sing. active participle	koteḇ כותב	kātib كاتب	"male writer"
Š verb stem	Hip̄‘il	af‘ala أَفْعَلَ (Stem IV)	3rd. masc. sing perfect	hiḵtiḇ הכתיב	aktaba أكتب	"he dictated"
Š verb stem	Hip̄‘il	af‘ala أَفْعَلَ (Stem IV)	3rd. masc. sing. imperfect	yaḵtiḇ יכתיב	yuktibu يكتب	"he dictates, will dictate"
Št(D) verb stem	Hitpa‘‘el	istaf‘ala استَفْعَلَ (Stem X)	3rd. masc. sing perfect	hitkatteḇ התכתב	istaktaba استكتب	"he corresponded" (Hebrew), "he asked (someone) to write (something), had a copy made" (Arabic)
Št(D) verb stem	Hitpa‘‘el	istaf‘ala استَفْعَلَ (Stem X)	3rd. masc. sing. imperfect	yitkatteḇ יתכתב	yastaktibu يستكتب	(imperfect of above)
Noun with m- prefix and original short vowels:		maf‘al مَفْعَل	singular	miḵtaḇ מכתב	maktab مكتب	"letter" (Hebrew), "office" (Arabic)

== Other languages ==
In Maltese, the same root is present, and commonly used, similar to that in Arabic and Hebrew, such as ktibt (I wrote), ktieb (a book), kitba (writing), and kittieb (m. writer) amongst many more.

In modern Tigrinya and Amharic, this root survives only in the noun kitab, meaning "amulet", and the verb "to vaccinate", it used to be used widely but it is now seen as an archaic form. Ethiopic-derived languages like these usually use a different root (ṣ-ḥ-f) ص-ح-ف for the verb "to write" (this root exists in Arabic and is used to form words with a close meaning to "writing", such as ṣaḥāfa "journalism", and ṣaḥīfa "newspaper" or "parchment").

In the Persian language family (Farsi, Dari, Tajik, etc.) the borrowed word kitab is the most commonly used word for "book". This word has also made its way into the Malay language as "kitab", and into Swahili as "kitabu", both meaning "book".

In languages like Pashto, the borrowed word kitab is also commonly used. The word kitab is also used in Indo-Aryan languages like Urdu, Hindi, Bhojpuri, Magahi, Awadhi, Nepali, Punjabi, Kashmiri, Dogri, and others.
