= Aretas IV Philopatris =

Nabataean king from 9 BC to 40 AD

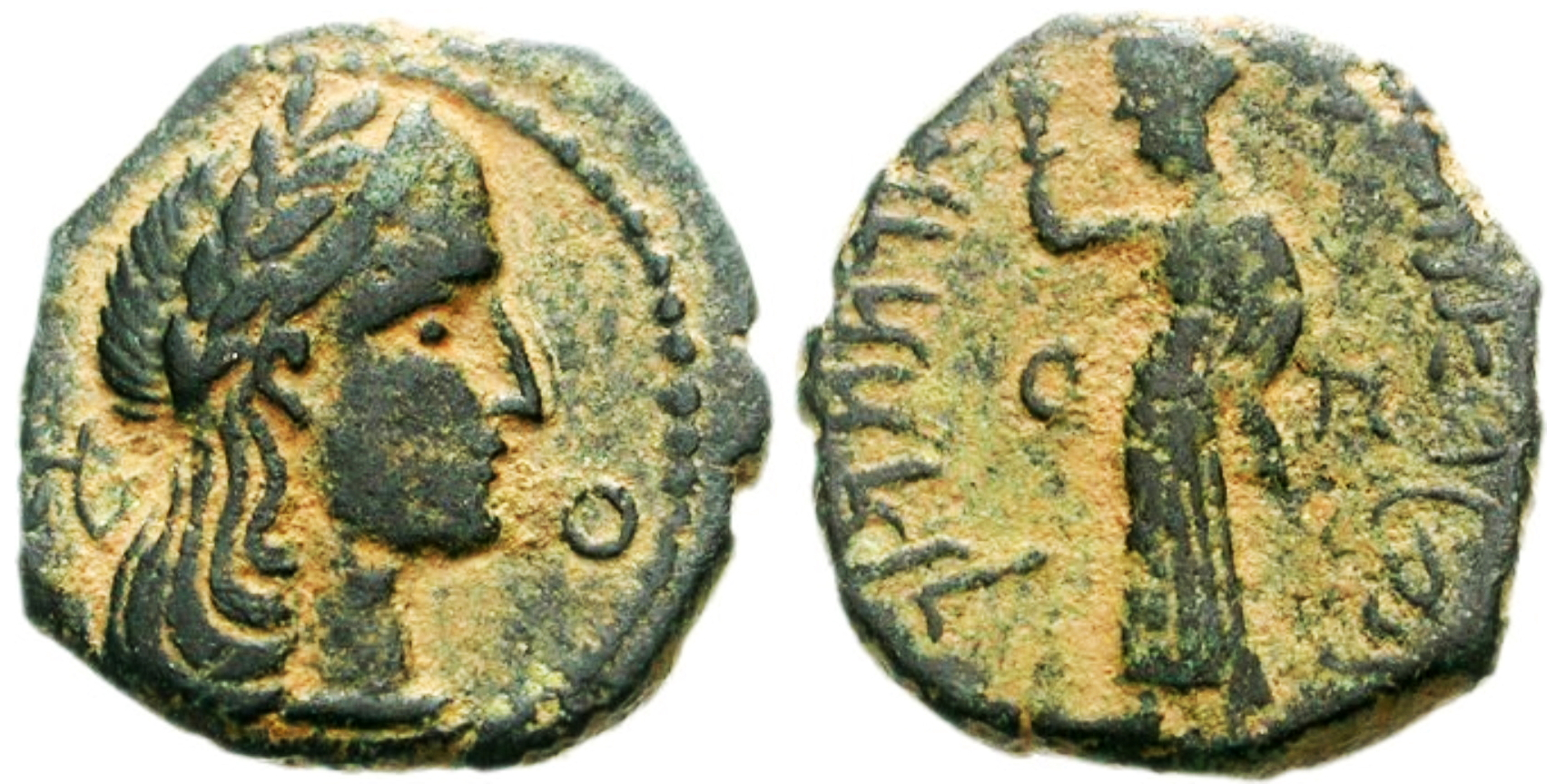
Bronze coin of Aretas IV from 3 BC.

Aretas IV Philopatris (Nabataean Aramaic: 𐢊𐢛𐢞𐢞 𐢛𐢊𐢒 𐢗𐢓𐢆, romanized: Ḥārītaṯ Rāḥem-ʿammeh, lit. 'Aretas, friend of his people' or, "lover of his people") was the King of the Nabataeans from roughly 9 BC to 40 AD.

Aretas's daughter Phasaelis was married to, and divorced from, Herod Antipas. Herod then married Herodias, his stepbrother's wife. It was John the Baptist's opposition to this marriage that led to his beheading. After Aretas received news of the divorce, he invaded the territory of Herod Antipas and defeated his army. Like his predecessors, the king's name as transcribed in Arabic is الحارث, Al Ḥāriṯ or الحارثة, Al-Ḥāriṯa, stemming from Harith which means "the collector, provider; plowman; cultivator".

== Rise to power ==
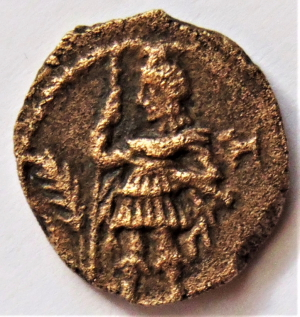
Coin showing Aretas IV in military dress.

Aretas came to power abruptly in 9 BC in the wake of the sudden death of Obodas II (formerly erroneously identified as Obodas III), without seeking the approval or permission of the Roman Emperor Augustus. Syllaeus, Obodas's minister (or epitropos, a position that was also called "brother of the king" in Nabataea), made several unfounded accusations in an attempt to prevent Aretas's ascension to power. He returned from his first trip to Rome, unsuccessful in his bid before the Emperor in 8 BC. The first silver coins issued by Aretas IV maintained the portrait of Obodas II on the obverse with his own on the front, and bronze coins even carried the portrait of Syllaeus. This practice ended after Syllaeus's second trip to Rome, which was also a failure and ended in his execution in 6–5 BC.

The capital of the Nabataean kingdom, Petra, was a prosperous trading city some 170 miles south of Amman, famous for its many monuments carved into the rose-red sandstone. The power of the Nabateans extended over most of the trade routes in southern Palestine, Sinai, the Hijaz and into Syrian desert, from the seventh century BC to the second century AD.

Josephus says of Aretas that he was originally named Aeneas, but took "Aretas" as his throne name. An inscription from Petra suggests he was a member of the royal family, as a descendant of Malichus I.

His full title, first inscribed in Nabataean Aramaic on coins issued in 1 BC, was "Aretas, King of the Nabataeans, Lover of his People." Being the most powerful neighbour of Judea, he frequently took part in the state affairs of that country and was influential in shaping the destiny of its rulers. As he was not on particularly good terms with Rome, and it was only after great hesitation that Augustus recognized him as king, he sent troops to support the Syrian governor Varus' efforts to quell the civil strife that erupted in the wake of Herod the Great's death in 4 BC.

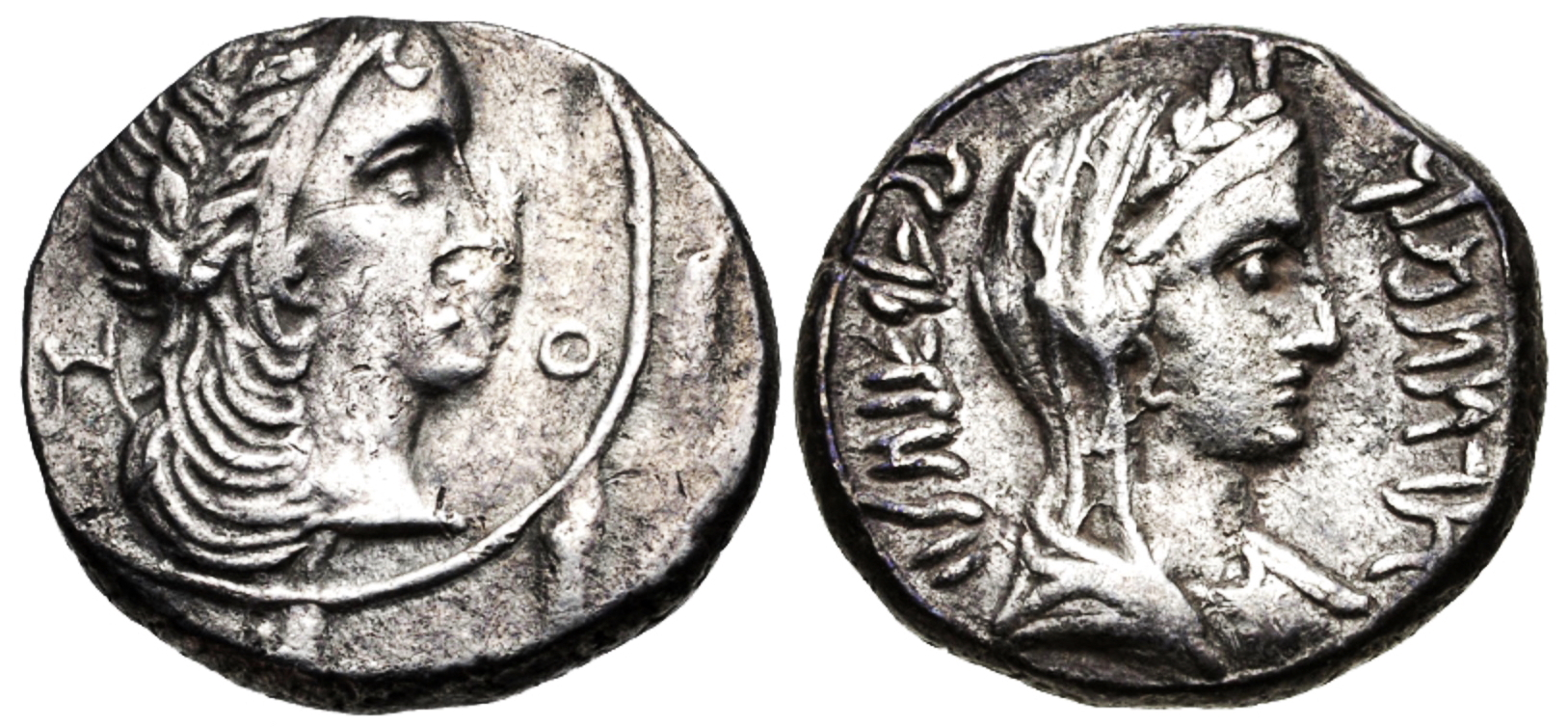
Silver drachm of Aretas IV with his wife Huldu from 2 BC.

Aretas IV style of kingship was very different from that of the other courts in the Empire, characterized by a relative lack of ceremony and hierarchy. He often hosted the people in his court, serving them personally, engaging in self-reflection and self-criticism. Strabo, recounting an anecdote shared by Athenodorus: "They [the Nabataeans] go out without tunics (akhitonos), with girdles about their loins, and with slippers on their feet – even the kings, though in their case the colour is purple." And, "He often renders an account of his kingship in the popular assembly; and sometimes his mode of life is examined."

Aretas married twice. His first wife was Huldu, daughter of Obodas II, to whom he was already married when he became king. Her profile was featured on the reverse of Nabataean coins until 16 AD with the inscription: "Queen Khaldah of the Nabataeans". Following her death, he married Shaqilath and there was a gap in the issuing of coins for a few years. When her image was included on the reverse of the coin, it was not a portrait, but of the royal couple together, indicating the unique status Khaldah enjoyed.

== Defeat of Herod Antipas ==
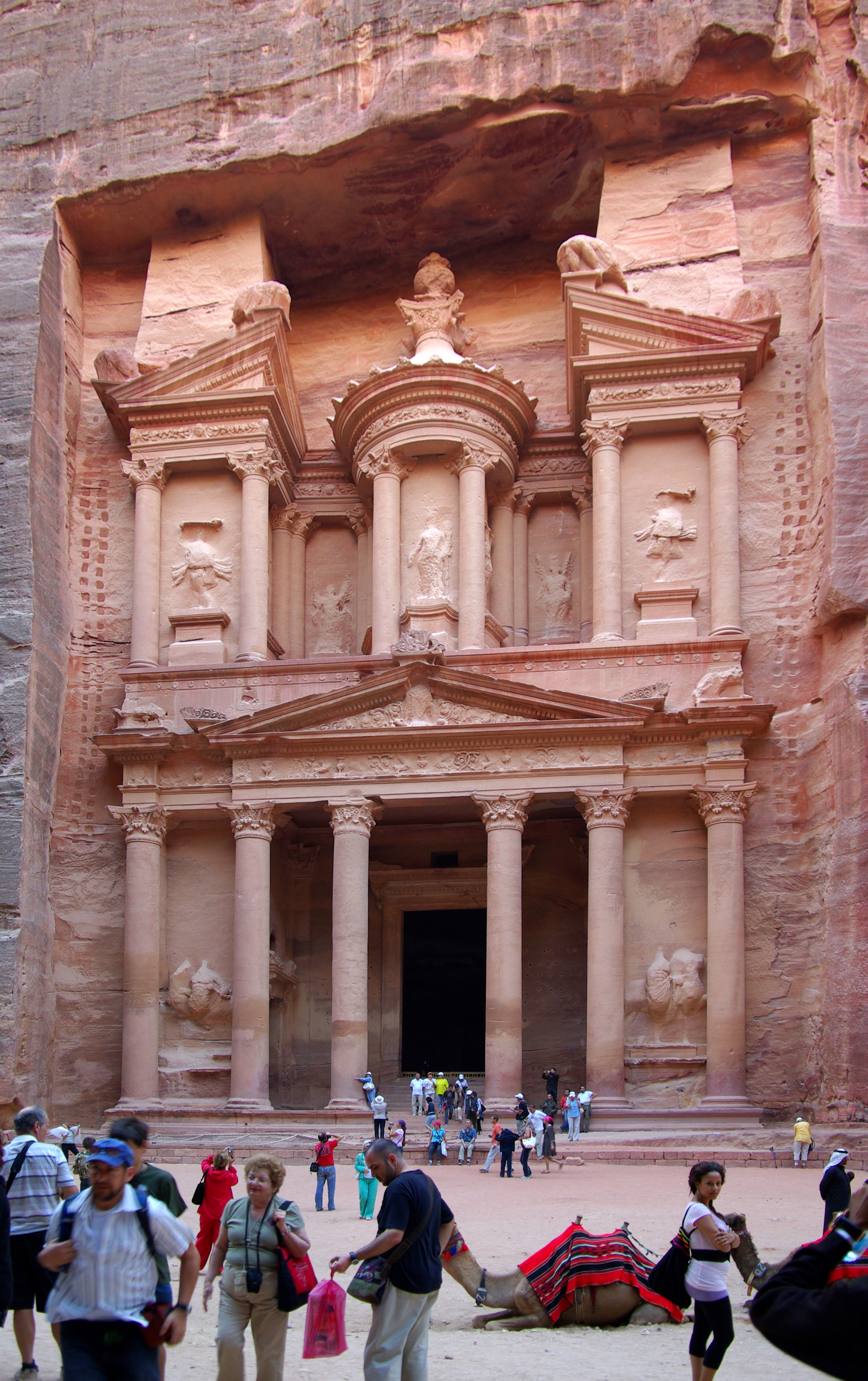
The Khazneh, at Petra, is believed to be Aretas IV's mausoleum.

Aretas's daughter, Phasaelis of Nabataea, married Herod Antipas, otherwise known as Herod the Tetrarch. Phasaelis fled to her father when she discovered her husband intended to divorce her in order to take a new wife, Herodias, mother of Salome. Herodias was already married to his brother, Herod II, who died around AD 33/34. Antipas married Herodias. According to Christian accounts, it was opposition to this marriage that led to the beheading of John the Baptist. However, the Jewish-Roman historian Josephus depicts John's execution instead as being a preemptive effort to prevent a rebellion.

Aretas invaded Herod Antipas's domain and defeated his army, partly because soldiers from the region of Philip the Tetrarch (a third brother) gave assistance to King Aretas. Josephus does not identify these auxiliary troops (he calls them 'fugitives'), but Moses of Chorene identifies them as being the army of King Abgarus of Edessa. Antipas was able to escape only with the help of Roman forces.

Herod Antipas then appealed to Emperor Tiberius, who dispatched the governor of Syria, Lucius Vitellius the Elder, to attack Aretas. Vitellius gathered his legions and moved southward, stopping in Jerusalem for the passover of AD 37, when news of the emperor's death arrived. The invasion of Nabataea was never completed.

The Christian Apostle Paul says that he had to sneak out of Damascus in a basket through a window in the wall to escape the ethnarch of King Aretas (2 Corinthians 11:32, 33). Proposals that control of Damascus was gained by King Aretas between the death of Herod Philip in 33/34 AD and his death in 40 AD are contradicted by substantial evidence against Aretas controlling the city before 37 AD and many reasons why it could not have been a gift from Caligula between 37 and 40 AD. Most uncertainty stems from whether troops belonging to Aretas actually controlled the city, or if Paul was referring to "the official in control of a Nabataean community in Damascus, and not the city as a whole." Several have proposed that Aretas briefly annexed Damascus after 37 AD.

Aretas IV died in AD 40 and was succeeded by his son Malichus II and daughter Shaqilath II.

== See also ==
- List of biblical figures identified in extra-biblical sources
- List of rulers of Nabatea
