= List of Nabataean kings =

The Rulers of Nabataea, reigned over the Nabataean Kingdom (also rendered as Nabataea, Nabatea, or Nabathea), inhabited by the Nabataeans, located in present-day Jordan, south-eastern Syria, southern modern-day Israel, Sinai Egypt, and north-western Saudi Arabia.

The queens of the later Nabataean Kingdom appear alongside their husbands as co-rulers on their coinage.

== List ==
Reign	Name	Arabic name	Notes
Kings of Nabataea
c. 248/247 BC	M[alichus]? (Note: Barkay, 2015: "The name of the Nabataean king who minted the first anonymous coins is unknown, but it could have been M[alichus], as suggested by one of the interpretations of the Milan papyrus.[...] A Nabataean king from this period is mentioned in a few written sources. One is a papyrus from Egypt kept in Milan comprising epigrams written by the poet Posidippus of Pella during the reign of Ptolemy II (286-246 BCE). It mentions a Nabataean king described as the commander of a powerful 'Arab cavalry force'. The word Ναβαταĩοc (Nabataean) stands alone and its continuation (on the next line) is with a missing word starting with the letter M. There are a few options for filling the gap after 'Nabataean', one of them is the name of the king Malichos (ȝ[άȜιχoc ὢ]Ȟ), a traditional name of Nabataean kings known from later periods. The fixed date of 248/247 BCE was given by an epigram celebrating the Olympian victories by Berenice II, daughter of Ptolemy II and wife of Antiochus II [...]")	مالك, Mālik	Mentioned by Posidippus of Pella
c. 169 BC	Aretas I	الحارث, Al-Ḥāriṯ or الحارثة, Al-Ḥāriṯa
120/110 to 96 BC	Aretas II	الحارث, Al-Ḥāriṯ or الحارثة, Al-Ḥāriṯa	In some sources appears as successor to Rabbel I
c. 96 to 85 BC	Obodas I	عُبادة, ʿubādah
c. 85/84 BC	Rabbel I	رب أيل, Rabb ʾayl	In some sources appears as successor to Aretas II
84 to 60/59 BC	Aretas III Philhellen	الحارث, Al-Ḥāriṯ or الحارثة, Al-Ḥāriṯa	Recognised by Rome 62 BC
62/61 to 60/59 BC	Obodas II (?)	عُبادة, ʿubādah	Existence uncertain until recently; probably ruled a few months
59 to 30 BC	Malichus I	مالك, Mālik
30 to 9 BC	Obodas III	عُبادة, ʿubādah
9/8 BC to 39/40	Aretas IV Philopatris	الحارث, Al-Ḥāriṯ or الحارثة, Al-Ḥāriṯa
9/8 BC to 39/40	Ḥuldo, Queen	خلدو, Ḫuldu
9/8 BC to 39/40	Šagīlat, Queen	شقيلة, Šaqīla
39/40 to 69/70	Malichus II	مالك, Mālik
39/40 to 69/70	Šagīlat II, Queen	شقيلة, Šaqīla
70/71 to 106	Rabbel II Soter	رب أيل, Rabb ʾayl
70/71 to 106	Gāmilat, Queen	جميلة, Jamīla
70/71 to 106	Hagaru, Queen	هاجر, Hajar
106	Annexed by Trajan becoming the Roman province of Arabia Petraea

== See also ==
- Aretas (disambiguation page)
- Lists of office-holders
- Nabataean Kingdom
- Nabataeans
- The Ancient Greek form of the name Aretas (Ἀρέτας) on Wiktionary
- The Latin form of the name Aretas on Wiktionary

== Sources ==
- Jewish Virtual Library
- Martha Ross, Rulers and Governments of the World – Vol1, Earliest Times to 1491. London & New York: Bowker Publishing Company, 1978.
