= Malchus (disambiguation) =

Malchus is the servant of the Jewish High Priest, Caiaphas, who participated in the arrest of Jesus.

Malchus may also refer to:

- Malchus (historian), Byzantine historian who wrote a history from Constantine to Anastasius I in 7 books
- Malchus of Syria (died c. 390), monk who was sold into slavery
- Malkuth or Malchus, the tenth of the sephirot in the Kabbalistic Tree of Life
- A German name for falchion, the weapon
- Malchus Porphyry, Syrian compiler of the Enneades, and anti-Christian literature
- Malchus (general), Carthaginian general who began systematic conquests of North Africa
- Malchut/Malchus (מלכות) means "kingdom" or "monarchy" in the Hebrew language.
