= Malichus I =

Nabataean king

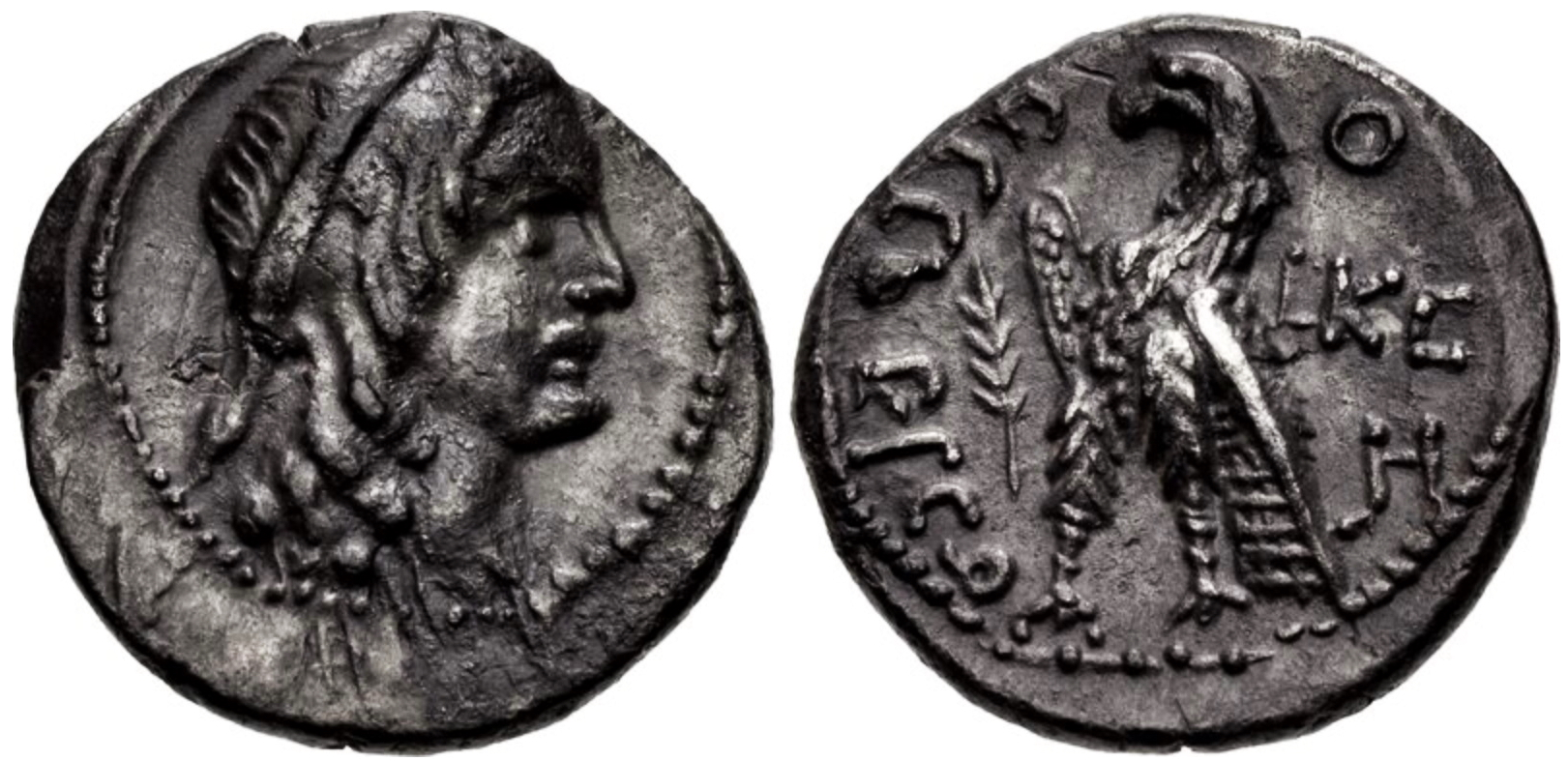
Silver drachm (half-shekel) of Malichus I from 34 BC

Malichus I or Malchos I (Nabataean Aramaic: 𐢓𐢑𐢏𐢈, romanized: Malīḵū or 𐢓𐢑𐢏𐢀, Malīḵūʾ) was a king of Nabataea who reigned from c. 59/58 to 30 BC. He ruled for nearly three decades, during a time of great turmoil within the Roman Empire which was extending its influence over the region. There are few written records regarding his early rule, and most of what is known of his later rule come from descriptions by Roman historians. His portrait, some information about Nabataean culture and the years of his rule are well known, dated and attested, due to Nabataean inscriptions and coins he minted during his last three years in power.

== Name ==
Malichus was the first of the Nabataean kings to carry this royal name, which is derived from the common Semitic root mlk meaning "king", and appears in the personal names of several ancient and subsequent kings in the region, as well as in the names and honorifics of ancient deities. Malichus is a romanization of the Greek form of his name as transcribed by historians like Josephus, who describes him as "Malichus the Arab king". His name as transcribed in Arabic is مالك Mālik.

== Rule ==
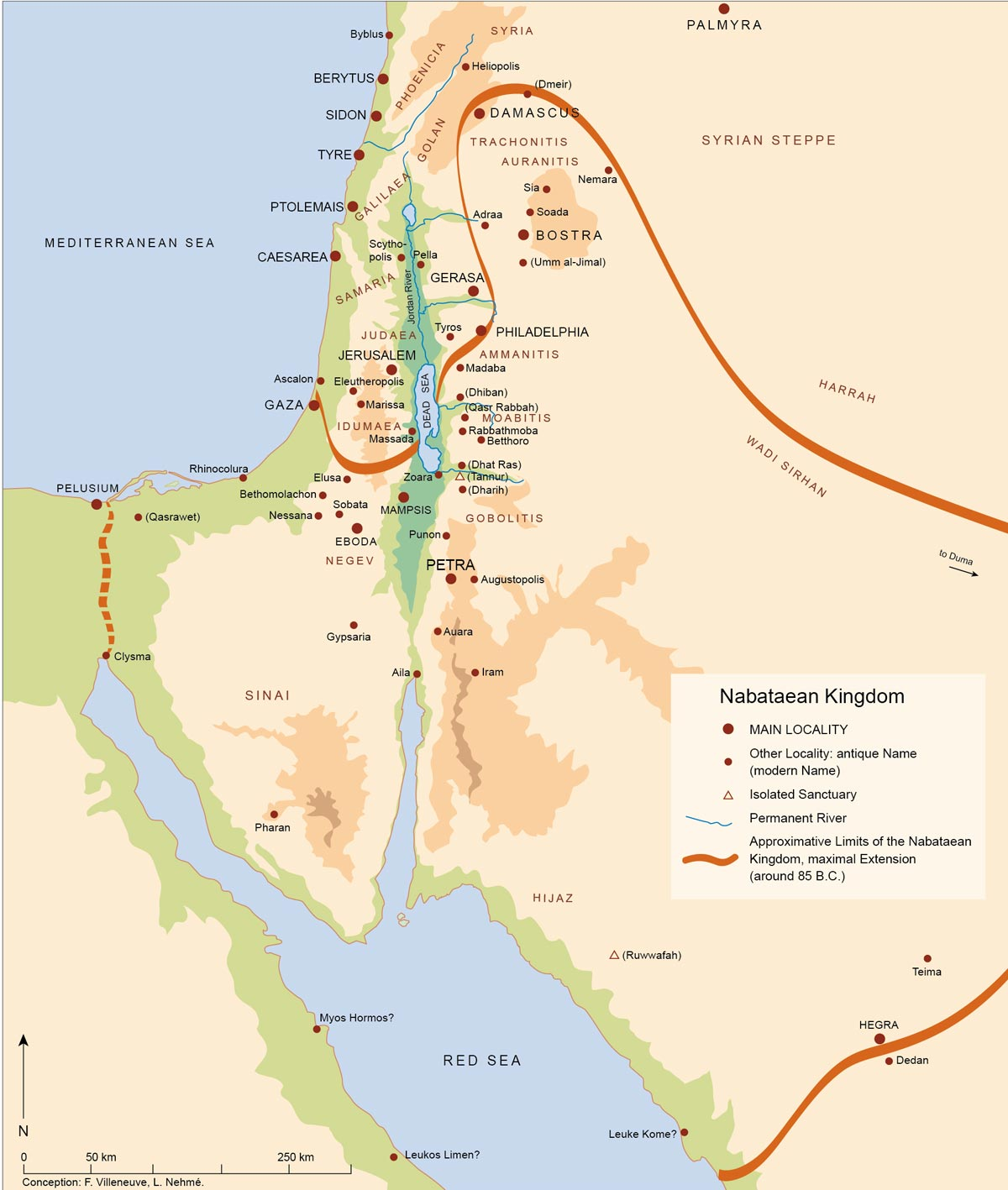
Map of the territory of the Nabataean kingdom c. 85 BC

There are few sources providing general information on the early years of Malichus' rule. The year of his accession to the throne was determined by cross-referencing his regnal year and that of Cleopatra VII's both of which were included as calendar dating systems in a Nabataean inscription discovered in Tell esh-Shuqafiya, Egypt, known as the Tell esh-Shuqafiya Nabataean inscription. The dedicatory inscription by a man named Wahb'Alahi to the deity Dusares shed important light on the chronology of the Nabataean king list, providing additional evidence for the hypothesized Obodas II, a short-lived predecessor king to Malichus, and successor to Aretas III.

In the inscription, the regnal year for Malichus I is given as 26, and is noted alongside Cleopatra's year 18. As her eighteenth year of rule was 35/34 BC, his rule must have begun in 59/58 BC. In his Bellum Alexandrinum, Julius Caesar mentions him only in passing, noting that he requested from Malichus, king of the Nabataeans, the provision of cavalry for Caesar's war on Egypt.

Malichus presided over the Nabataean kingdom within a larger geopolitically turbulent context with serious infighting between the Roman empire's elites who had set their sights on controlling and pacifying Judaea (where there were also internal dynastic disputes) and the wider region of Palestine (then part of the new province of Roman Syria), as well as the rest of Arabia (not yet a fully incorporated Roman province). Historian Glen Bowersock notes he managed to handle the many diplomatic intrigues of this era with some success.

Malichus was a possible cousin of Herod the Great of the Herodian kingdom, as Herod's mother Cypros, the wife of Antipater the Idumaean, was a Nabataean princess. When Herod fled Judea in 40 BC to escape imprisonment by the Hasmonean ruler Antigonus II Mattathias, who had already imprisoned his brother Phasael, he first traveled to the court of Malichus. However, Malichus I turned Herod away, as the Nabataean king was politically aligned with the Parthian Empire, which viewed Herod as a client ruler of the rival Roman Republic. Herod then decided to take refuge instead in Alexandria, at the court of Cleopatra VII of Ptolemaic Egypt.

Malichus I eventually came into conflict with Cleopatra VII after her lover and Roman triumvir Mark Antony granted her Nabataean territories in the Gulf of Aqaba along the Red Sea, which had long been used as a staging ground for Nabataean raids on Ptolemaic lands. After a bitter open conflict between Malichus I and Cleopatra, allegedly stoked by her aggressive acts, Malichus I, along with Herod, failed to show up and support Antony and Cleopatra during the fateful Battle of Actium in 31 BC, a decisive victory for their rival Octavian. Malichus seems to have died in 30 BC, shortly after Cleopatra apparently took her own life in despair, and was succeeded by Obodas III.

== Coinage ==
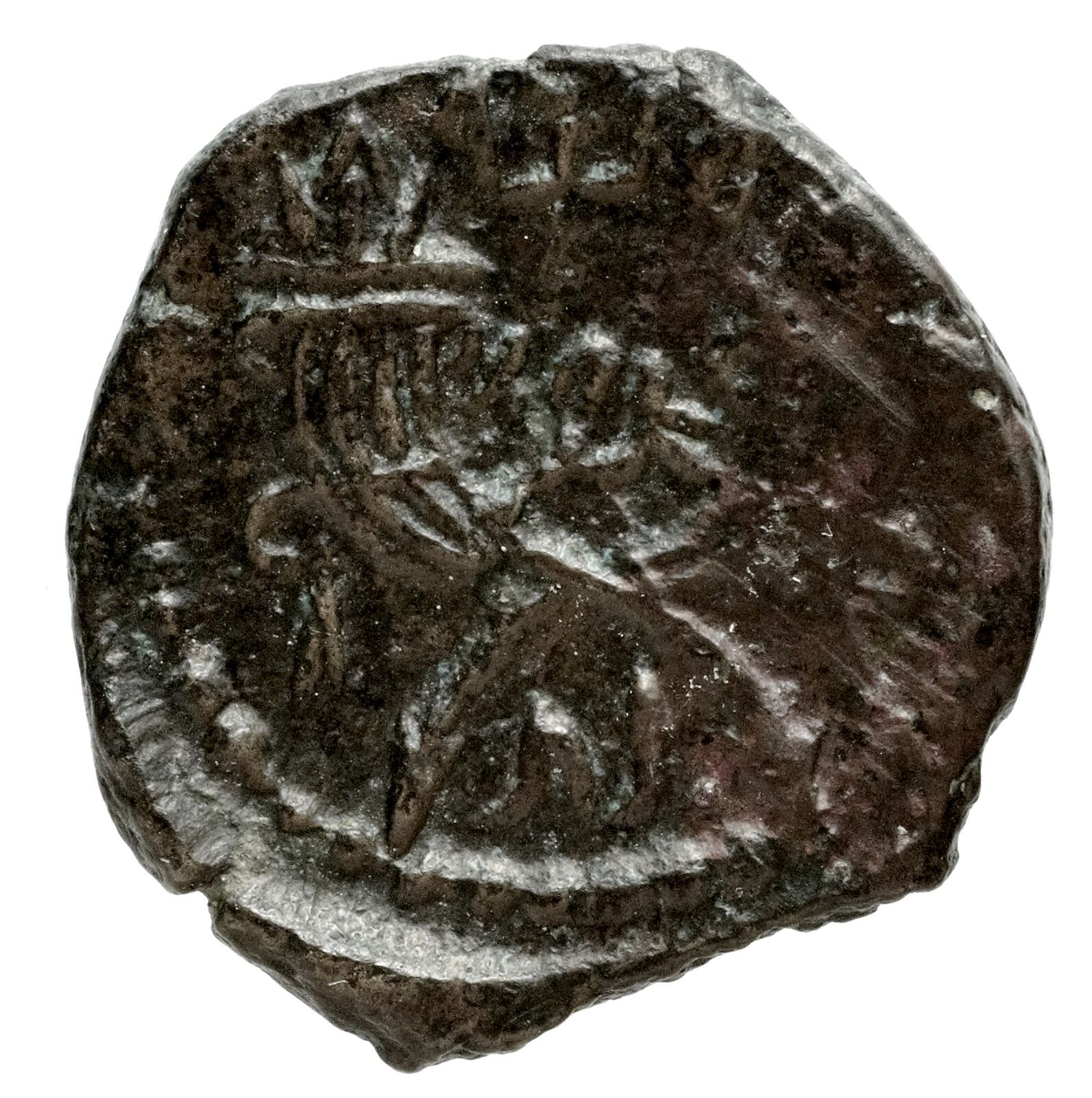
The reverse of one of the quarter-shekel bronze coins issued by Malichus, worn by time. (For a clearer example of the silver series, see the portrait at top.)

As masters in trade and of the incense route from Gaza passing through their cities in Negev to the Dead Sea, extending also south to the Red Sea and beyond, as well as of the King's highway that passed through their capital and treasury in Petra and extended north to Damascus, they were intimately familiar with and regularly used the coinage of others in the region, including those issued by local mints like that in Gaza. Nabataean kings seem to have issued a few coin series prior to Malichus I, (Note: Barkay, 2015, documents several Nabataen undated coins lacking portraits, overstruck on Ptolemaic issues. She attributes them to 3rd century Nabataean king whose name remains unconfirmed but could also have been Malichus: "Although detailed information on Nabataean history in the 3rd century BCE is lacking, excavations show that Petra was a big city by then, while the Milan papyrus, the inscription from Damascus Museum, and Strabo indicate that the Nabataean kingdom was in existence. The name of the Nabataean king who minted the first anonymous coins is unknown, but it could have been M[alichus], as suggested by one of the interpretations of the Milan papyrus.) but it is in the last three years of his rule that a regular organized minting system was established, one that continued until the annexation of the Nabataean kingdom and its incorporation into the Roman empire in 106 CE.

The coins minted in the last years of Malichus' rule were made of silver and bronze. The silver coins were issued in two denominations: half-shekel and quarter-shekel. Carrying Nabataean Aramaic legends, they read, "Malichus the king, King of the Nabataeans" (with one variant omitting the latter half). They are also dated by regnal year using Greek letters, preceded by an "L" signifying "date". On the obverse of all is a portrait of Malichus, his curly hair topped by a diadem. On the reverse is an eagle (Note: Eagles appear frequently in Nabataean iconography, and are variously interpreted as references to Dusares and Qos (See p. 236 Index in Healy, 2001).) which on the quarter-shekel is also foregrounded by a palm branch.

The bronze coins carried the same obverse as the silver, with the reverse differing according to their size. On the large bronze coins (22 millimetres (2.2 cm)), a cornucopia was depicted, while the medium (18–20 millimetres (1.8–2.0 cm)) carried the eagle of the silver series. On the reverse of the small bronze coins (16 millimetres (1.6 cm)) was a hand that J. Patrich has identified as the Idâ-rûmâ ("high hand" or "strong hand") of Dusares, a deity worshipped in pre-Islamic Arabia. While the inscribed legends on the bronze coins were identical with the silver, the dates on the bronze coins were recorded using Nabataean numerals and preceded by Nabataean script reading snh ("year").

== See also ==
- List of rulers of Nabatea
- Malichus II
