= Shaqilath =

1st-century queen of the Nabataeans

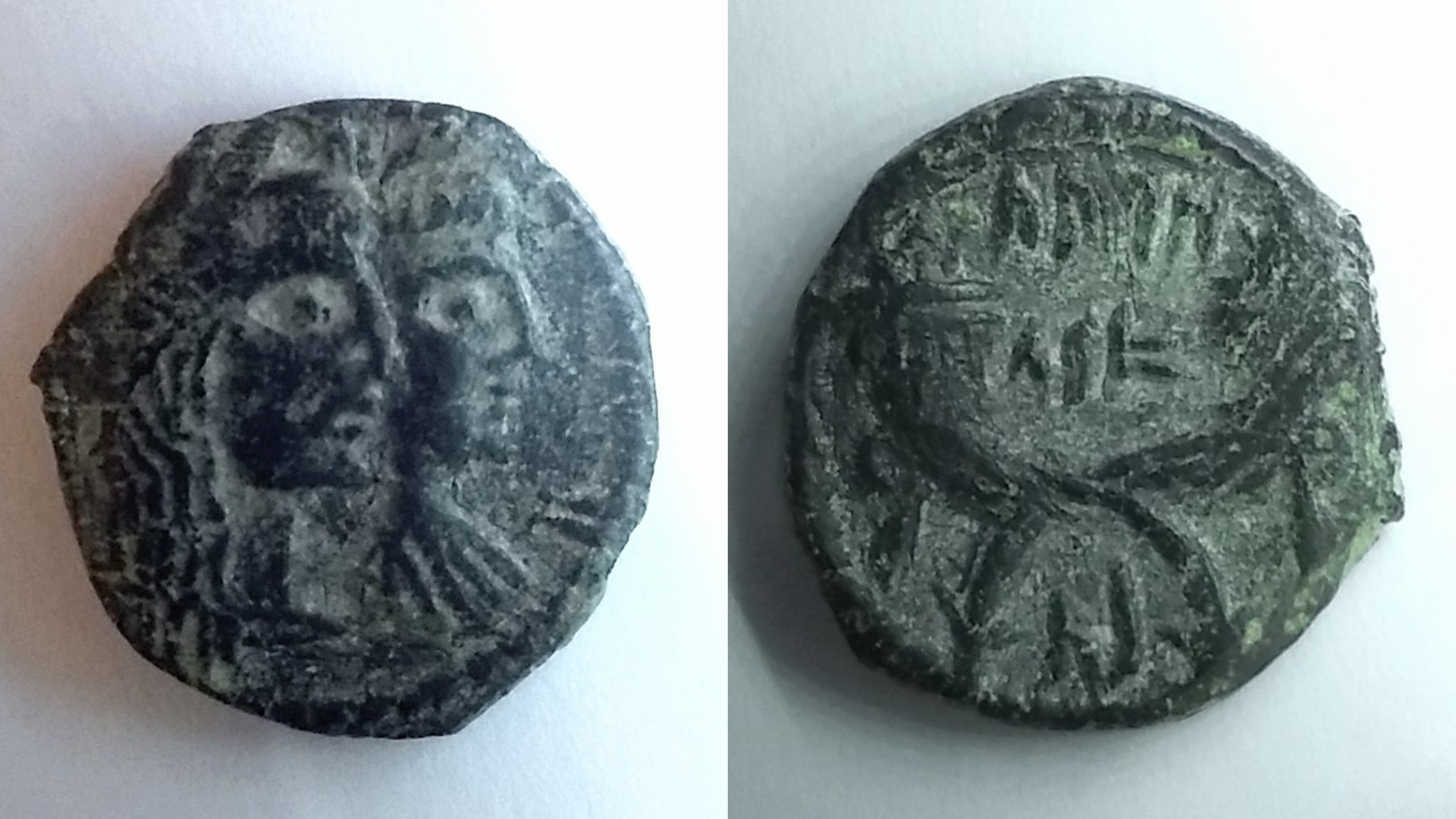
Nabataean Kingdom, Aretas IV and Shaqilat, 9 b. C. - 40 a. D., AE18. Obverse: Jugate busts of Aretas IV ad Shaqilat; reverse: Crossed cornucopia; name of Aretas IV and Shaqilath in Nabataean script. Grading VF

Shaqilath (Nabataean Aramaic: 𐢝𐢚𐢍𐢑𐢞, romanized: šqylt; also spelled Shaqilat, Shaqeela, Shaqeelah, Šagīlat) was a queen of the Nabataeans. Her name as transcribed in Arabic is شقيلة Šaqīla.

She was the second wife and co-ruler of Aretas IV of the Nabataeans in AD 16–40.

She married King Aretas IV in 16 AD and had four children with him: Hagru or Hajir, Malik, Jameelah and Shaqilath II.

Her role as queen and her proximity to the king is emphasized by her title "the Sister of the King".

During the reign of King Aretas IV and Shaqilat, the trades expanded to distant areas in the ancient world and industry, commerce and civilization of the Nabataeans flourished.

Copper and silver coins where she is depicted with her husband have been recovered, and they offer expressive examples and models of the Nabataean civilization in terms of the culture of clothing.

== See also ==
- List of rulers of Nabatea
- Shaqilath II
