= Malichus II =

Ruler of Nabatea from 40 to 70 AD

Malichos II
- King of the Nabataean Kingdom
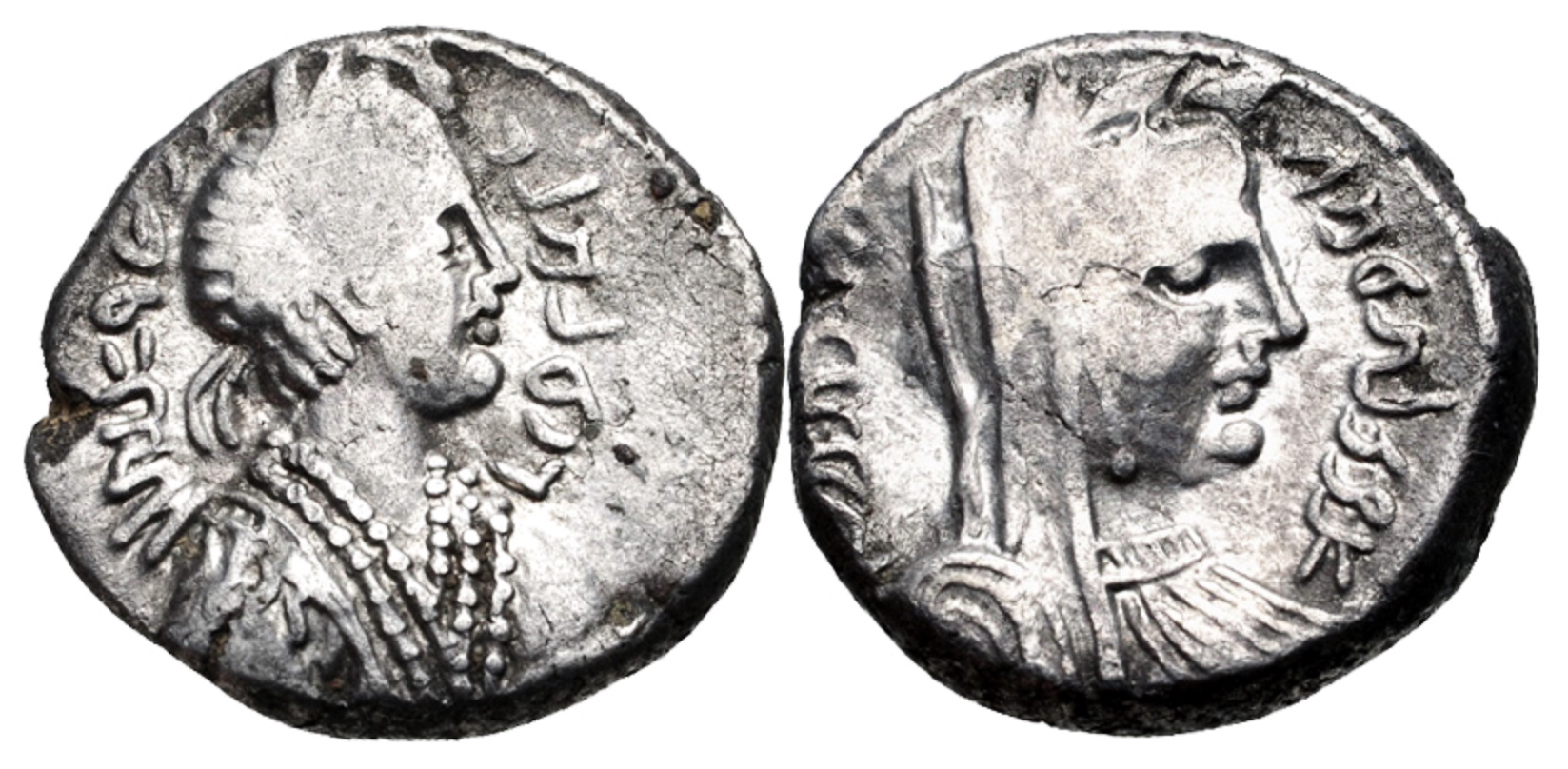
- Silver drachm of Malichus II's son Rabbel II with Malichus' wife Shaqilat
- Reign: 40-70 AD
- Predecessor: Aretas IV Philopatris
- Successor: Rabbel II Soter
- Died: 70 AD
- Spouses: Shaqilath II
- Issue: Rabbel II Soter

Malichus II (Nabataean Aramaic: 𐢓𐢑𐢏𐢈, romanized: Malīḵū or 𐢓𐢑𐢏𐢀, Malīḵūʾ) was ruler of Nabatea from 40 to 70 AD. He was the son of Aretas IV Philopatris and father of Rabbel II Soter.

== Sources ==
Josephus is the only written source for Malichus II.

== Biography ==
Malichus II was born to Aretas IV Philopatris.

Malichus II ruled from 40 to 70 AD. The port of Leuke Kome was occupied by the Romans during his reign and they diverted trade away from Petra and towards Roman ports in Egypt. Malichus' reign is sometimes perceived as a period of declining Nabataean power, but this view depends in part on Nabataea having controlled Damascus in the period 34–40. He contributed 5,000 infantry and 1,000 cavalry to the army of Titus during the First Jewish–Roman War according to Josephus. He had a son, Rabbel II Soter, with his wife and sister Shaqilath II.

The lowest silver content in known coins issued by Malichus II was 47% and the average weight of his silver coins were 3.58 grams, which is less than the average of 4.01 grams of Aretas IV Philopatris.

At Mada'in Salih there are eight inscriptions of Malichus II, compared to twenty inscriptions for Aretas IV Philopatris and two for Rabbel II Soter. The dating of the Periplus of the Erythraean Sea to the middle of the 1st century AD is based on it mentioning Malichus II.

Malichus II died in 70 ADand was probably buried in the al-Mahkamah tomb and was succeeded by Rabbel II Soter, who was the last king of the Nabataeans before its annexation into the Roman Empire.

== See also ==
- List of rulers of Nabatea

== Works cited ==
=== Books ===
- Casson, Lionel (1989). The Periplus Maris Erythraei: Text with Introduction, Translation, and Commentary. Princeton University Press. ISBN 0691040605.

=== Journals ===
- Barkay, Rachel (2019). "Coinage of the Nabataeans". Qedem. 58. Hebrew University of Jerusalem: III–XVI, 1–150. doi:10.2307/26910342. JSTOR 26910342.
- Khairy, Nabil (1980). "An Analytical Study of the Nabataean Monumental Inscriptions at Medā'in Ṣāleḥ". Zeitschrift des Deutschen Palästina-Vereins. 96 (2). German Society for the Exploration of Palestine: 163–168. doi:10.2307/27931140. JSTOR 27931140.
- McLaughlin, Raoul (2015). "Ancient Contacts: The Roman Emperor and the Sinhalese King". Classics Ireland. 22. Classical Association of Ireland: 1–40. doi:10.2307/26246545. JSTOR 26246545.
- Peters, F. (1977). "The Nabateans in the Hawran". Journal of the American Society for Premodern Asia. 97 (3). American Society For Premodern Asia: 263–277. doi:10.2307/600733. JSTOR 600733.
- Starcky, Jean (1955). "The Nabataeans: A Historical Sketch". The Biblical Archaeologist. 18 (4). University of Chicago Press: 81–82, 84–106. doi:10.2307/3209134. JSTOR 3209134.

== Sources ==
- Jane Taylor: Petra And the Lost Kingdom of the Nabataeans. I. B. Tauris 2001, ISBN 1860645089, p. 73 (online copy, p. 73, at Google Books)
- Maria Giulia Amadasi, Eugenia Equini Schneider: Petra. University of Chicago Press 2002, ISBN 0226311252, p. 40, 94, 166, 168, 170 (online copy, p. 168, at Google Books)
