= Aretas III =

Nabataean king from 87-62 BCE

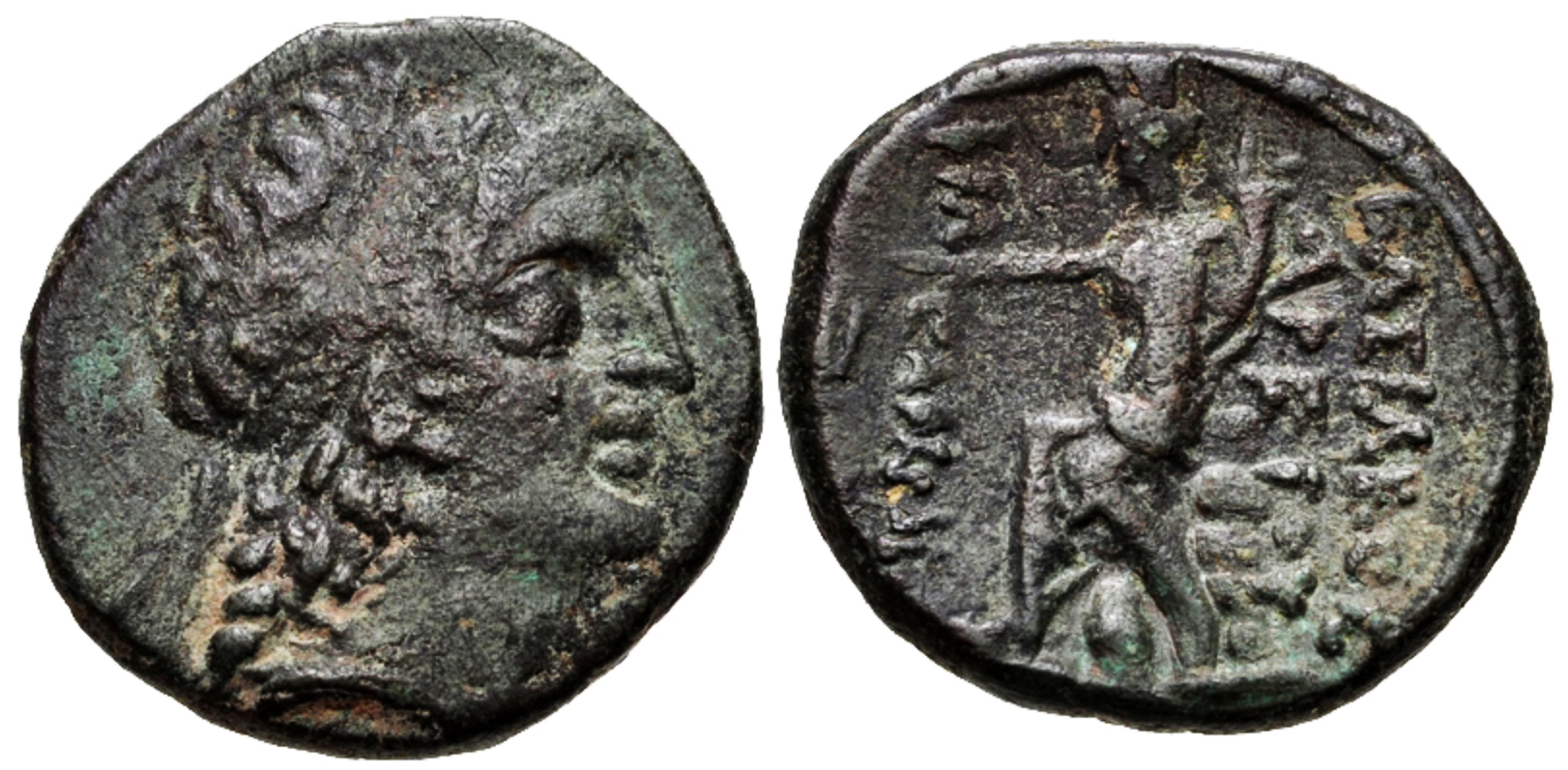
Aretas III bronze coin

Aretas III (/ˈærɪtəs/; Nabataean Aramaic: 𐢊𐢛𐢞𐢞, romanized: Ḥārītaṯ; Ancient Greek: Αρέτας, romanized: Arétās) was king of the Nabataean kingdom from 87 to 62 BCE. Aretas ascended to the throne upon the death of his brother, Obodas I, in 87 BCE. During his reign, he extended his kingdom to cover what now forms the northern area of Jordan, the south of Syria, and part of Saudi Arabia. Probably the greatest of Aretas' conquests was that of Damascus, which secured his country's place as a serious political power of its time. Nabataea reached its greatest territorial extent under Aretas' leadership. Like his predecessors, the king's name as transcribed in Arabic is الحارث, Al-Ḥāriṯ, or الحارثة, Al-Ḥāriṯa, stemming from Harith which means "the collector, provider; plowman; cultivator".

== Conquest of Damascus ==
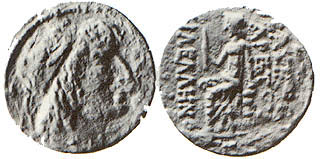
Aretas III commissioned the first silver Nabataean coins and ordered that his name appear in Greek rather than Nabataean Aramaic.

Damascus straddled the primary commercial route from the Mediterranean Sea to India and the Middle East. The city was taken from the loosening grip of the Seleucid Empire in 85 BCE by Aretas, who styled himself as Aretas Philhellen (Philhellen, "friend of the Greeks"). He ordered the mints of Damascus to produce the first silver Nabataean coins, in a Hellenic style and lettering his name in the Greek language instead of Nabataean Aramaic.

To further reinforce the new culture of the Nabataeans, Aretas endeavoured to bring architecture of Greek and Roman fashion to the Nabataean capital, Petra, and to new settlements such as Humayma, including a 26.8 km aqueduct.

Nabataean rule of Damascus was interrupted in 72 BCE by a successful siege led by the Armenian king Tigranes II. Armenian rule of the city ended in 69 BCE when Tigranes' forces were pulled out to deal with a Roman attack on the Armenian capital, allowing Aretas to re-take the city.

== Hyrcanus and the Judean throne ==
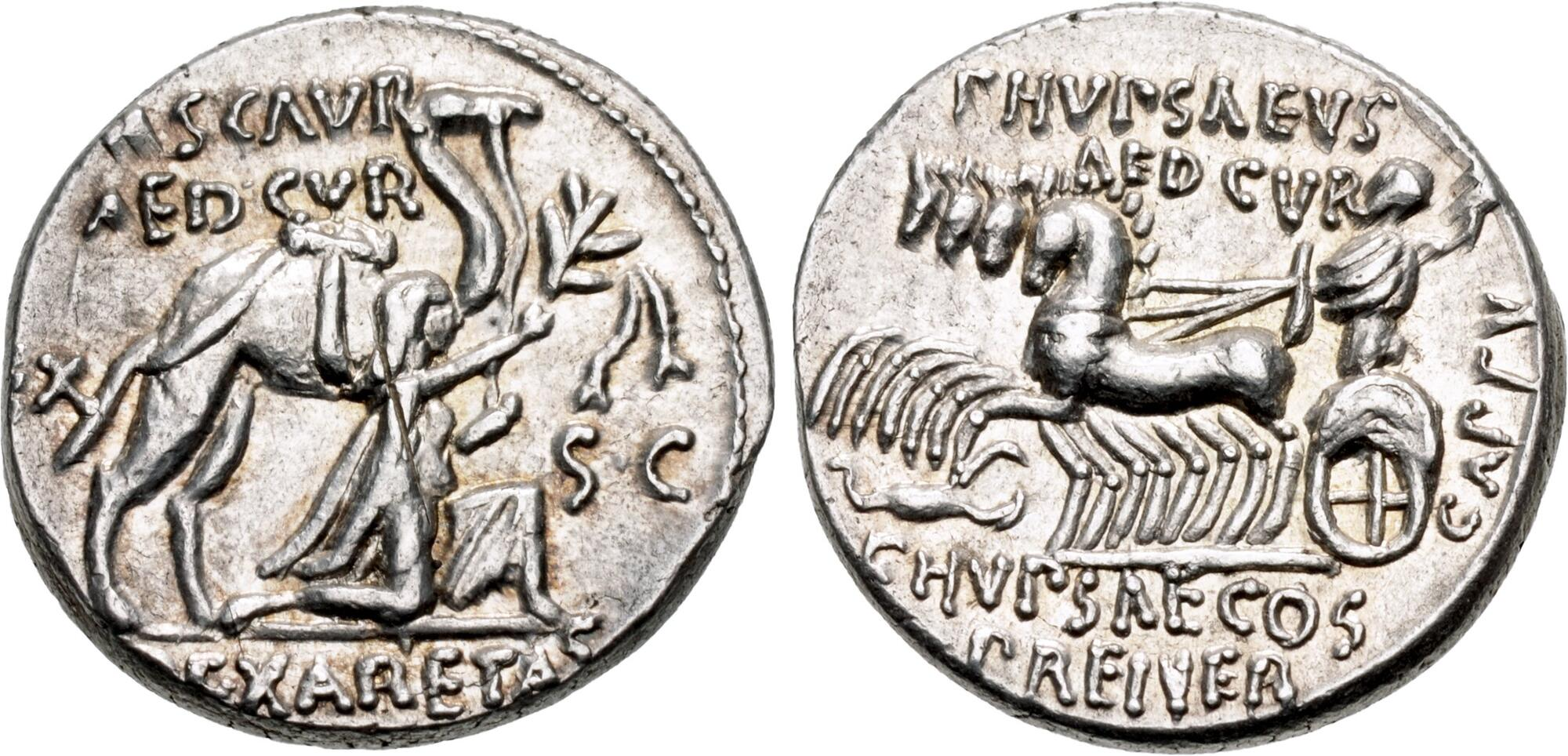
Denarius minted for the aedilician games of 58 BCE, showing Aretas III kneeling beside a camel and on the reverse Jupiter driving a quadriga

In 67 BCE, Hyrcanus II ascended to the throne of Judea. Scarcely three months later, his younger brother Aristobulus II incited a rebellion, successfully leading the uprising to overthrow Hyrcanus and take the offices of both King and High Priest. Hyrcanus was confined to Jerusalem, where he would continue to receive revenues of the latter office. However, fearing for his life, he fled to Petra and allied himself with Aretas, who agreed to support Hyrcanus after receiving the promise of having the Arabian towns taken by the Hasmoneans returned to Nabataea by Hyrcanus' chief advisor, Antipater the Idumaean.

Aretas advanced towards Jerusalem at the head of 50,000 men, besieging the city for several months. Eventually, Aristobulus bribed Marcus Aemilius Scaurus, deputy of the Roman general Pompey. Scaurus ordered Aretas to withdraw his army, which then suffered a crushing defeat at the hands of Aristobulus on the journey back to Nabatea.

Despite the compliance of Aretas, in 62 BCE Scaurus marched on Petra. However, a combination of the rough terrain and low supplies obliged Scaurus to seek the aid of Hyrcanus, now High Priest (not king) of Judea, who sent Antipater to barter for peace with Aretas. The siege was lifted in exchange for several hundred talents of silver (to Scaurus himself) and recognition of Roman supremacy over Nabatea. Aretas would retain all Nabataean territory and possessions, becoming a vassal of the Roman Republic.

== See also ==
- List of rulers of Nabatea
