= Nabataean inscriptions =

Inscriptions of the Nabataean kingdom

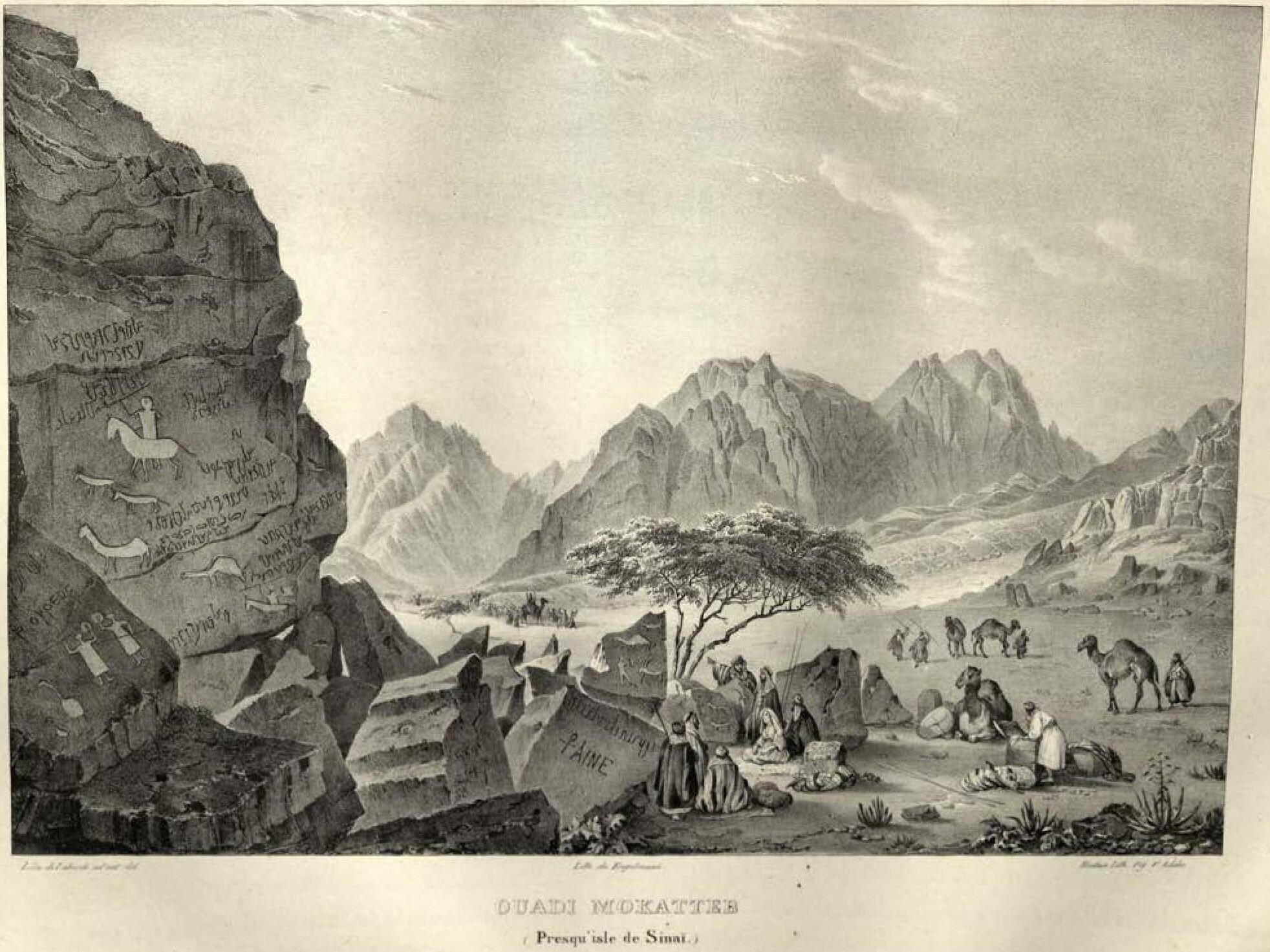
Léon de Laborde’s sketch of Wadi Mukattab, showing multiple Nabataean inscriptions

Nabataean inscriptions are a large corpus of inscriptions associated with the Nabataean Kingdom, centred on Petra in modern Jordan and extending across the Arabian Peninsula, the Levant, and parts of the Mediterranean. The texts date roughly from the 2nd century BCE until the Roman annexation of Nabataea in 106 CE, and in some cases continue into the post-Nabataean period. They are written in the Nabataean Aramaic dialect using the Nabataean alphabet, a cursive script that is considered to have later developed into the Arabic alphabet (see e.g. Namara inscription). The majority of Nabataean inscriptions are undated and of uncertain provenance. Securely dated texts are concentrated in the 1st century CE.

Nabataean is primarily an epigraphic language, known almost entirely from inscriptions and a small number of documentary papyri, and are therefore the principal source for the language, history, religion, and society of the Nabataeans. Approximately 6,000–7,000 Nabataean inscriptions have been identified, though the majority are short graffiti consisting mainly of personal names. A much smaller subset, such as the 38 funerary inscriptions from Madā’in Ṣāliḥ, provides longer, continuous texts and forms the core corpus for linguistic and historical analysis. The 15 known papyrus and leather include more complex sentence structures and a wider range of verbal forms than the stone inscriptions. The known vocabulary is only a few hundred distinct words, such that grammatical reconstruction is often uncertain. A number of multilingual inscriptions are known, particularly bilingual Greek–Nabataean inscriptions.

Most inscriptions were discovered in Petra, Hegra (Mada'in Salih), the Sinai Peninsula, and northern Arabia, as well as along trade routes linking Nabataea with Egypt, Syria, and the wider Mediterranean world. Today, Nabataean inscriptions are preserved both in situ and in museum collections worldwide, including the Louvre, the British Museum, and regional museums in Jordan and Saudi Arabia.

== Discovery and decipherment ==
=== Sinai inscriptions ===
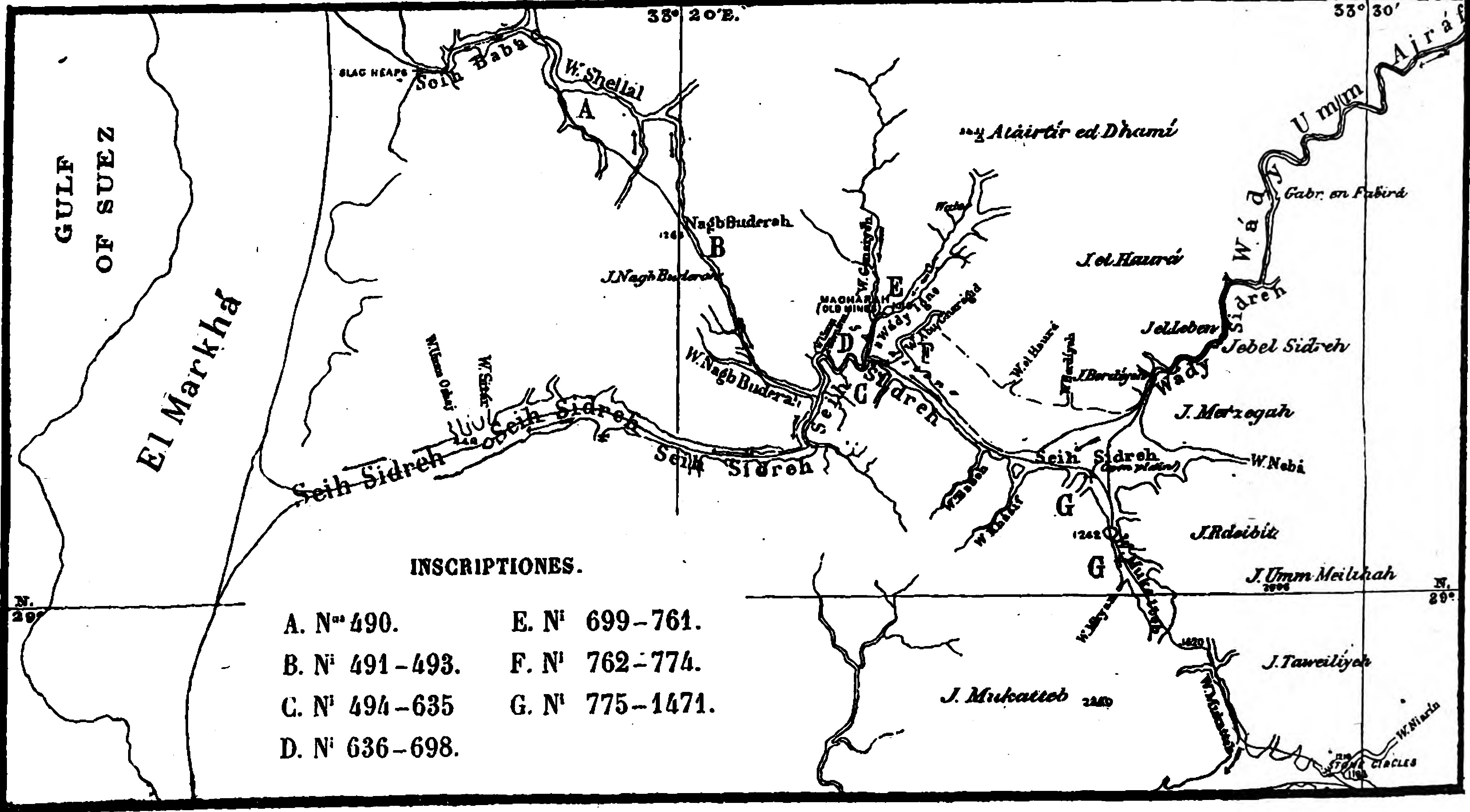
Wadi Mukattab

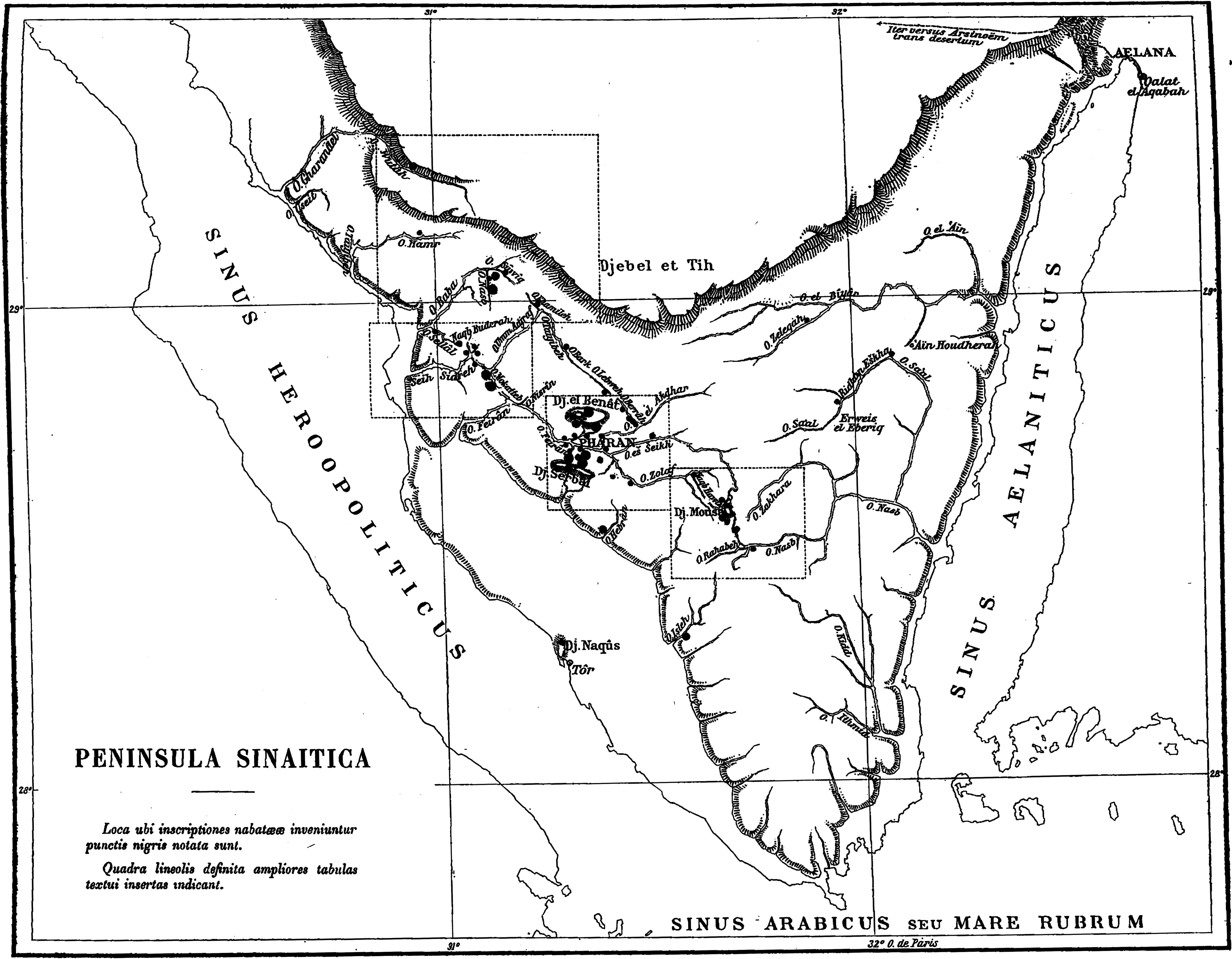
Sinai Peninsula

Location of Nabataean inscriptions in the Corpus Inscriptionum Semiticarum

The Sinaitic inscriptions, in the region of Mount Sinai, were known to travellers long before their modern decipherment. Egeria, who visited Sinai between 381 and 384, described inscriptions near Pharan as Hebrew letters. Her account of these inscriptions survives through Peter the Deacon's De locis sanctis (1137), which preserves portions of her otherwise lost text. Writing in the late 540s, Cosmas Indicopleustes similarly interpreted the inscriptions as Hebrew writing left by the Israelites during their wanderings in the wilderness. He explained their abundance as the result of the Israelites practising the letters they had learned through the giving of the Law, although his report that Jewish readers understood them as records of travellers' names and journeys more closely resembled their actual contents. Later Christian travellers added their own inscriptions, frequently beside the earlier Nabataean texts. This has been interpreted as evidence of devotional imitation and the association of later prayers with an apparently sacred past, rather than the deliberate erasure of the earlier inscriptions.

Pietro Della Valle, who travelled through Sinai in 1615–1616, was credited by Raymond Weill with the earliest modern reference to the inscriptions. The earliest widely circulated discussion derived indirectly from Cosmas Indicopleustes (published in Bernard de Montfaucon’s 1706 edition). Other seventeenth- and early eighteenth-century travellers also mentioned them, although generally as objects of curiosity rather than sustained epigraphic investigation. Egmond van der Nijenburg copied examples of the inscriptions during his journey through Sinai in 1721. Richard Pococke, who visited sixteen years later, discussed the earlier account in A Description of the East and Some Other Countries (1743–1745). The interpretation of the inscriptions as Israelite writing remained influential. In 1752, the Bishop of Clogher Robert Clayton offered £100 annually for five years towards an expedition to copy them. His publication of the Franciscan Prefetto's journal, An Essay on the Character and Origin of the Sinaitic Inscriptions (1753), promoted their investigation while explaining them as writing exercises undertaken by the Israelites during their wilderness wanderings.

More concrete publication of the inscriptions themselves began with Edward Wortley Montagu, who printed copies of twenty-five Sinai inscriptions in a letter to the Royal Society (1766). These were subsequently republished and reinterpreted by scholars including Antoine Court de Gébelin (1775), while further copies appeared in the works of Carsten Niebuhr (Reisebeschreibung nach Arabien, 1774–1837) and later travellers. By the early 19th century the Sinaitic inscriptions were well established in print, albeit poorly copied and misidentified.

The Danish expedition to Arabia of 1761–1767 included the recording and decipherment of the Sinai inscriptions among its objectives, although this part of its programme largely failed to materialise. Niebuhr, who visited Sinai in 1762, nevertheless copied twenty texts. In 1766, Montagu recognised the recurring sequence šlm, subsequently translated as "peace" or "be secure". John Lewis Burckhardt copied further inscriptions in 1816 and observed that the cliffs of Wadi Mukattab provided shade for travellers during the middle of the day. His account, published in 1822, supplied evidence for the practical use of the locations at which the graffiti accumulated.

=== Decipherment ===
The decipherment of the Nabataean script was achieved in 1840 by Eduard Friedrich Ferdinand Beer. Beer published Inscriptiones veteres litteris incognitis in Sina et Aegypto repertas, in which he worked primarily from the previously printed Sinai corpus and succeeded in identifying almost the entire alphabet and reading numerous inscriptions correctly. At this point, no Nabataean inscriptions from Petra had yet been published, and Beer explicitly noted the absence of any known epigraphic material from Petra for comparison. His attribution of the script to the Nabataean cultural sphere was therefore made on the basis of the Sinaitic material as transmitted in earlier printed sources. Beer's readings included the recurring expressions šlm and dkyr, the latter meaning "let him be remembered". These established the predominantly formulaic character of the graffiti, in contrast to earlier interpretations of them as records of the Exodus. Beer died in 1841, aged 36, before the connection he had proposed with the Nabataean inscriptions of Petra was conclusively demonstrated.

=== Petra inscriptions ===
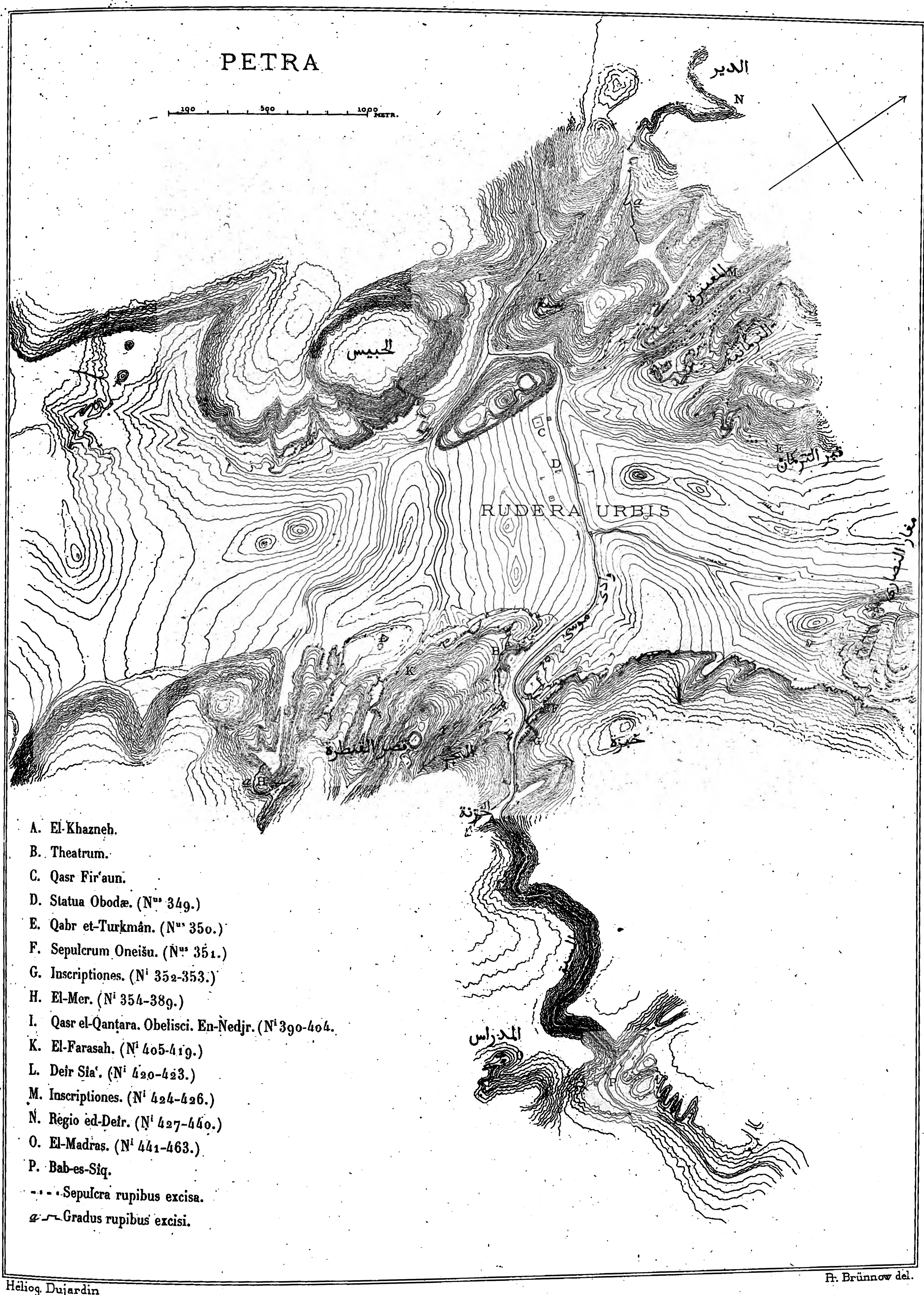
Location of Nabataean inscriptions in Petra, in the Corpus Inscriptionum Semiticarum

The first publication of Petra inscriptions was by Willem Blaeu in 1855, who printed a small number of Nabataean texts from Petra. These publications provided monumental inscriptions in the same script as the Sinaitic graffiti. Building on this, Moritz Abraham Levy (1860) demonstrated the palaeographic relationship between the Sinaitic inscriptions, the Petra inscriptions, and Aramaic texts from the Ḥawrān, consolidating the identification of the script as Nabataean. Only much later, in 1896, did the material copied decades earlier by William John Bankes, including his copy of the five-line Nabataean inscription on the Qabr al-Turkmān façade at Petra and his copies of Sinai inscriptions finally become available to scholarship.

During his travels between 1815 and 1819, Bankes had already recognised the correspondence between the script of the Turkmaniyya tomb inscription at Petra and that of the Sinai graffiti. The limited circulation of his copies prevented this observation from contributing more directly to the earlier decipherment. Visual documentation also expanded during the nineteenth century. Léon de Laborde's Journey through Arabia Petraea, to Mount Sinai, and the excavated city of Petra (1836) included a lithograph of Wadi Mukattab, while Francis Frith photographed inscribed rocks in Sinai for The Queen's Bible (1862–1863).

=== Later publications ===
A further turning point came with the discovery of Nabataean papyri in the mid-twentieth century, including documents from the Cave of Letters near the Dead Sea.

The relationship between script and the identity of its users remained a subject of debate. In "Were the Sinai Rock Inscriptions Really Inscribed by 'Nabateans'?" (2000), Ze'ev Meshel questioned whether the use of Nabataean necessarily identified the writers as members of the Nabataean population. The absence of many characteristic Nabataean divine names and the rarity of royal names and official titles were among the considerations used to distinguish the Sinaitic writers from the better-known Nabataean cultural centres. Later accounts of the history of research included Jane Taylor's "Language, Script and Graffiti" (2002) and N. N. Lewis and M. C. A. MacDonald's "W. J. Bankes and the Identification of the Nabataean Script" (2003). Larison examined the inscriptions' reception alongside their linguistic contents, arguing that their interpretation as biblical Hebrew and the addition of later pilgrimage graffiti helped incorporate otherwise unreadable texts into a Christian understanding of Sinai's landscape.

== Corpora ==
6,000 – 7,000 Nabataean inscriptions have been published, of which more than 95% are mostly short inscriptions or graffiti, and the vast majority are undated, post-Nabataean or from outside the core Nabataean territory:

- 3,851 short graffiti are known from the Mount Sinai area, dating to the 2nd–3rd centuries CE. They were found "in remote wadis, on rock outcrops and summits, near isolated water sources, on sandstone as well as hard igneous rock…" Another 4,000 – 7,000 such Sinaitic inscriptions are estimated to remain unpublished.
- 1,000 inscriptions, partly unpublished, have been found in Petra; they are primarily dedications on statues.
- Mada'in Saleh contains monumental tombs with Greek-style façades, longer than those in Petra, recording legal matters concerning tomb property. They date to the first 75 years of the 1st century CE.
- Bosra has a small number inscriptions.
- In Italy, two inscriptions have been found in Pozzuoli, and three in Rome, Italy.
- 51 Greek-Nabataean inscriptions are known, including 17 from Petra, 13 from Hauran, 3 on Egypt’s Red Sea coast (Safaga and El Qoseir), 13 in the Mount Sinai area, one in Saudi Arabia (Ruwafa), one from Lebanon (Sidon), and three in the Aegean Sea region (Miletus, Delos and Kos).

In prior to 1889, only 300 inscriptions were known; Julius Euting discovered 700 further in 1889-90. Many of these were short graffiti texts; prior to the publication of Nabataean papyri, the only substantial corpus of detailed Nabataean text were the 38 funerary inscriptions from Mada'in Salih (Hegra), discovered and published by Charles Montagu Doughty, Charles Huber, Philippe Berger and Julius Euting in 1884–85.

A complete corpus of all Nabataean inscriptions has not yet been compiled. Early corpora included the Corpus Inscriptionum Semiticarum (CIS) and later publications by Alfred von Domaszewski and Rudolf Ernst Brünnow. The work of Jean Cantineau in the early twentieth century provided the first comprehensive grammatical description of Nabataean Aramaic based on the expanding corpus.

The oldest known Nabataean inscription was found in Elusa (Haluza).

The Nabataean corpus is dispersed across numerous publications and catalogues. Major corpora and reference systems include:

- CIS – Corpus Inscriptionum Semiticarum, containing early editions of Nabataean inscriptions. This is still considered the most comprehensive corpus.
- RES – Répertoire d'épigraphie sémitique
- NE – Handbuch der Nordsemitischen Epigraphik
- Jaussen–Savignac – early twentieth-century publications of inscriptions from Arabia
- PPUAES – Publications of the Princeton University Archaeological Expeditions to Syria
- SEG – Supplementum Epigraphicum Graecum (for Greek parallels and bilinguals)
- TSSI – Texts from the Semitic Inscriptions series
- RIGP – Rock Inscriptions and Graffiti Project (Michael E. Stone) 3 vols

A selected concordance of the inscriptions is shown below:

Region	Location	Name	Type	Language	Quellen	CIS/RES	NSI	NE	Jaussen/Savignac	PPUAES	Waddington	SEG	Sartre	Healey	TSSI	Other
Italy, Aegean, Asia Minor, and Syria	Rome		Funerary	Latin; Nabataean	A.001.01	II, 159										CIL VI, 34196
Italy, Aegean, Asia Minor, and Syria	Rome		Votive	Latin; Greek	A.001.02							15 (1958) 616				
Italy, Aegean, Asia Minor, and Syria	Rome		Votive	Nabataean; Latin	A.001.03											Amadasi Guzzo 1988, 67f.
Italy, Aegean, Asia Minor, and Syria	Rome		Inscribed coin	Latin	A.001.04											RRC 422
Italy, Aegean, Asia Minor, and Syria	Rome		Inscribed coins	Latin	A.001.05											BMC III, 474–477, 877f., 919, 977–981, 997, 1009–1011
Italy, Aegean, Asia Minor, and Syria	Puteoli	Puteoli Nabataean inscriptions	Building	Nabataean	A.002.01	II, 158	102									
Italy, Aegean, Asia Minor, and Syria	Puteoli	Puteoli Nabataean inscriptions	Votive	Nabataean	A.002.02	II, 157										
Italy, Aegean, Asia Minor, and Syria	Puteoli	Puteoli Nabataean inscriptions	Votive	Latin	A.002.03											
Italy, Aegean, Asia Minor, and Syria	Tinos		Honorific	Greek	A.003.01											IG XII Suppl., 307
Italy, Aegean, Asia Minor, and Syria	Delos		Votive	Nabataean; Greek	A.004.01											Félix Durrbach / Pierre Roussel Inscriptions de Délos, Paris 1935, 2315
Italy, Aegean, Asia Minor, and Syria	Priene		Honorific	Greek	A.005.01											Friedrich Hiller von Gaertringen Inschriften von Priene, Priene 2, Berlin 1906, 108, Kol. V
Italy, Aegean, Asia Minor, and Syria	Miletus		Votive	Nabataean; Greek	A.006.01	RES 675 + 1100									18	Georg Kawerau / Albert Rehm Das Delphinion in Milet, Milet I, Heft 3, Berlin 1914, 165
Italy, Aegean, Asia Minor, and Syria	Kos		Votive	Nabataean; Greek	A.007.01											Levi Della Vida 1938, 139–147
Italy, Aegean, Asia Minor, and Syria	Rhodes		Decree	Greek	A.008.01							3 (1927) 674				
Italy, Aegean, Asia Minor, and Syria	Sidon		Votive	Nabataean; Greek	A.013.01	II, 160										
Italy, Aegean, Asia Minor, and Syria	Carnuntum		Funerary	Latin	A.a.01											CSIR, Österreich I 4, 553; ILS III 2, 9168
Italy, Aegean, Asia Minor, and Syria	Chalke		Honorific	Greek	A.b.01											IG XII 963
Italy, Aegean, Asia Minor, and Syria	Rheneia		Funerary	Greek	A.c.01							23 (1968) 381				
Damascus region	Damascus		Votive	Palmyrene	B.001.01	II, 3991										
Damascus region	Damascus		Votive	Palmyrene	B.001.02	II, 3973, RES 285 + 815										
Damascus region	Ḥumair		Votive	Nabataean	B.002.01	II, 161	97	448, 2A								
Damascus region			Inscribed coins	Greek	B.003.01											Meshorer 1975, 5–8; 48–49A; 51; 53f.; 60–60A; 65; 79f.; 83–87; 94–96; 98–111
Trachonitis / al-Lajā	Saura (Ṣûr al-Laḥâ)		Funerary	Nabataean	C.002.01											Starcky 1985, 177–180
Trachonitis / al-Lajā	Saura (Ṣûr al-Laḥâ)		Building	Greek	C.002.02											IGRom III 1143
Trachonitis / al-Lajā	Damatha (Dâmâ; Dâmat al-ʿAliya)		Building	Greek	C.003.01					III A 7, 800/2						
Trachonitis / al-Lajā	Dair al-Laban		Votive	Greek	C.a.01						1870, 2393					
Trachonitis / al-Lajā	Sakkaia (Ṣaqqâ)		Funerary	Greek	C.b.01						1870, 2143					IGRom III 1191
Ḥarra	Namara		Memorial	Greek	D.001.01						1870, 2271					IGRom III 1257
Ḥarra	Namara		Memorial	Greek	D.001.02					III A 5, 747	1870, 2267					IGRom III 1259
Ḥarra	Wadi Miqâṭ		Memorial	Safaitic	D.a.01											Oxtoby 1968, 57
Ḥarra	al-Ṣifnā, Wadi al-ʿAḍam		Memorial	Safaitic	D.b.01											Dussaud/Macler 1903, 251
Ḥarra	al-Ṣifnā		Memorial	Safaitic	D.b.02					IV C, 94						
Ḥarra	Wadi l-Ḫarz		Memorial	Safaitic	D.c.01											Dussaud/Macler 1903, 554
Ḥarra	Eastern Jordanian desert		Memorial	Safaitic	D.d.01											Winnett/Harding 1978, 2113
Ḥarra	Eastern Jordanian desert		Memorial	Safaitic	D.d.02											Winnett/Harding 1978, 2185
Ḥarra	Eastern Jordanian desert		Memorial	Safaitic	D.d.03											Winnett/Harding 1978, 387
Ḥarra	Eastern Jordanian desert		Memorial	Safaitic	D.e.01											Winnett 1957, 287
Ḥarra	Eastern Jordanian desert		Memorial	Safaitic	D.e.02											Winnett 1957, 688
Ḥarra	Desert of ar-Ruḥba		Memorial	Safaitic	D.f.01											Nägí 1962, 165–170
Ḥarra	Jordanian desert		Memorial	Safaitic	D.g.01											Khraysheh 1995, 1
Ḥarra	Jordanian desert		Memorial	Safaitic	D.g.02											Khraysheh 6
Auranitis / northern Hauran / Jabal al-Druze	Atheila (Attil, Syria)		Votive	Greek	E.002.01						1870, 2374a					CIG 4609 und Add. S. 1181
Auranitis / northern Hauran / Jabal al-Druze	Kanatha		Votive	Nabataean	E.003.01	RES 53+806+1474										AAES II, 414f.
Auranitis / northern Hauran / Jabal al-Druze	Seeia		Building	Nabataean	E.004.01	II, 163, RES 803 + 2023				IV A, 100						
Auranitis / northern Hauran / Jabal al-Druze	Seeia		Building	Greek	E.004.02						1870, 2367					AAES III, 428b
Auranitis / northern Hauran / Jabal al-Druze	Seeia		Statue	Greek	E.004.03						1870, 2364					AAES III, 427b
Auranitis / northern Hauran / Jabal al-Druze	Seeia		Statue	Nabataean; Greek	E.004.04	II, 164		449, 2Bb			1870, 2366				15	AAES III, 428a
Auranitis / northern Hauran / Jabal al-Druze	Seeia		Statue	Greek; Nabataean	E.004.05	RES 1092				III A 6, 767; IV A, 103						
Auranitis / northern Hauran / Jabal al-Druze	Seeia		Votive	Nabataean	E.004.06	RES 2117				IV A, 101						
Auranitis / northern Hauran / Jabal al-Druze	Ṣibrān		Building	Nabataean	E.009.01	II, 170	98	449, 2Bc								
Auranitis / northern Hauran / Jabal al-Druze	Ṣibrān		Building	Greek	E.009.02					III A 5, 659	1870, 2286					IGRom III 1293
Auranitis / northern Hauran / Jabal al-Druze	As-Suwayda					II, 162		449, 2Ba								Suwaida
Auranitis / northern Hauran / Jabal al-Druze	Imtan						101									NSI Imtan
Southern Hauran	Unknown		Votive	Nabataean	F.--.01											Milik 1958, 231–235
Southern Hauran	Bosra		Votive	Nabataean	F.007.01	II, 174	100	450, d2								
Southern Hauran	Bosra			Nabataean; Greek	F.007.02								1982a (IGLS XIII 1), 9003			Milik 1958, 235–241, Taf. 19a
Southern Hauran	Bosra		Votive	Greek	F.007.03								1982a (IGLS XIII 1), 9006f.			
Southern Hauran	Bosra		Honorific	Greek	F.007.04					III A 4, 569			1982a (IGLS XIII 1), 9084			Brünnow/Domaszewski III, 1909, 4
Southern Hauran	Bosra		Votive	Greek	F.007.05											Dussaud/Macler 1903, 109
Southern Hauran	Mallâḥ (Mallâḥ al-ʿArrâr)		Votive	Greek	F.008.01					III A 5, 706	1870, 2023					
Southern Hauran	Salchad		Building	Nabataean	F.011.01	II, 182		450, e							17	
Southern Hauran	Salchad		Votive	Nabataean	F.011.02	RES 2051				IV A, 23						
Southern Hauran	al-Mutʾiyya (al-Umtʾiyya)		Inscription	Greek	F.012.01					III A 2, 43						
Southern Hauran	Kharāṣīb (Qurayyib)		Building	Nabataean	F.015.01											Starcky 1985, 180f.
Southern Hauran	Dayr al-Mashqūq		Votive	Nabataean	F.020.01	RES 2053				IV A, 27						
Southern Hauran	Imtan		Votive	Nabataean	F.025.01	RES 83										Dussaud/Macler 1901, 36
Southern Hauran	Ṭarya (Tall al-Ṭarya)		Votive	Nabataean	F.031.01	RES 86 + 471									16	Dussaud/Macler 1901, 62 a+b; 1903, 8
Southern Hauran	Umm el-Jimal		Votive	Nabataean; Greek	F.038.01	II, 190				III A 3, 238; IV A, 38						
Southern Hauran	Umm el-Jimal			Nabataean; Greek	F.038.02	II, 192, RES 1097				III A 3, 238/1; IV A, 41						
Southern Hauran	Umm al-Quttain		Building	Greek	F.039.01					III A 2, 211						
Southern Hauran	Bosra					II, 173		450, d1								Bostra
Decapolis	Hippo		Votive	Greek	H.001b.01											Ovadiah 1981, 101–104
Decapolis	Kapitolias (Beit Ras)		Funerary	Nabataean	H.003.01	II, 194, RES 1098										
Decapolis	Gerasa		Votive	Greek; Nabataean	H.008.01											Kraeling 1938, 371–373
Decapolis	Gerasa		Votive	Greek	H.008.02							7 (1934) 893				
Decapolis	Gerasa		Votive	Greek	H.008.03							7 (1934) 850				
Decapolis	Gerasa		Votive	Greek	H.008.04											Gatier 1982, 3
Decapolis	Gerasa		Votive	Greek	H.008.05							7 (1934) 862				
Northern Moab	Madaba	Madaba Nabataean Inscriptions	Funerary	Nabataean	K.006.01	II, 196, RES 674	96	450, C							9	
Northern Moab	Madaba	Madaba Nabataean Inscriptions	Funerary	Nabataean; Greek	K.006.02											Gatier 1986 (IGLS XXI 2), 118
Northern Moab	Zîza (Zuwaiza)		Votive	Nabataean; Greek	K.009.01	RES 1284			II, 392, II, 2							Gatier 1986 (IGLS XXI 2), 154
Northern Moab	Umm ar-Raṣâṣ		Funerary	Nabataean	K.051.01	II, 195										Brünnow/Domaszewski II, 1905, 70
Northern Edom	Khirbat at-Tannûr		Votive	Nabataean	M.065.01											Savignac 1937, 405–416
Central Edom	Thoana (at-Tuwâna)		Milestone	Latin	N.014.01											ILS 5834, CIL III, 14149.21–3
Central Edom	Petra	Petra	Inscribed coins	Nabataean	N.060.-.01											Meshorer 1975, Suppl. 5; 7; 8
Central Edom	Petra	Petra	Memorial	Nabataean	N.060.-.02											Negev 1971, 50–52
Central Edom	Petra	Bab al-Siq	Votive	Nabataean	N.060.05.01	RES 1432									2	Dalman, 1912, 90
Central Edom	Petra	Bab al-Siq	Memorial	Nabataean	N.060.05.02											Starcky 1965a, 44–46, 95–97
Central Edom	Petra	Bab al-Siq	Funerary	Nabataean; Greek	N.060.05.03								1993 (IGLS XXI 4), 54	243f.		Milik 1976, 143–152
Central Edom	Petra	Al-Siq	Votive	Greek	N.060.08.01								1993 (IGLS XXI 4), 14a–b			
Central Edom	Petra	Al-Siq	Grave slab	Nabataean	N.060.08.02											Zayadine 1982, 366–369
Central Edom	Petra	Upper Market	Votive	Greek	N.060.14c.01								1993 (IGLS XXI 4), 37			
Central Edom	Petra	North Temple	Temple	Nabataean	N.060.14h.01										5	Hammond et al. 1986, 77–90
Central Edom	Petra	North Temple	Votive	Nabataean	N.060.14h.02											Hammond 1980, 265–269
Central Edom	Petra	Qasr al-Bint	Statue	Nabataean	N.060.14j.01											Starcky/Strugnell 1966, 236–247
Central Edom	Petra	Qasr al-Bint	Votive	Nabataean	N.060.14j.02											Starcky/Strugnell 1966, 244–247
Central Edom	Petra	Qasr al-Bint	Statue	Nabataean	N.060.14j.03	II, 349										Brünnow/Domaszewski I, 1904, 405
Central Edom	Petra	Qasr al-Bint	Honorific	Latin	N.060.14j.04								1993 (IGLS XXI 4), 45			Starcky/Bennett 1968, 9
Central Edom	Petra	Az-Zantur (?)	Building	Nabataean	N.060.14l.01											Starcky 1971a, 151–159
Central Edom	Petra	An-Numayr	Votive	Nabataean	N.060.17.01	II, 354	95								4	Brünnow/Domaszewski I, 1904, 290
Central Edom	Petra	Al-Siyaq	Votive	Nabataean	N.060.24.01											Milik/Starcky 1975, 120–124; 187f.
Central Edom	Petra	Qasr ad-Dayr	Votive	Nabataean	N.060.25.01											Milik 1958, 246–248, 7
Central Edom	Petra	Wadi Turkmaniya	Funerary	Nabataean	N.060.29.01	II, 350	94								6	Brünnow/Domaszewski I, 1904, 633
Central Edom	Petra	Al-Habta necropolis	Votive	Nabataean	N.060.37.01	RES 1434										Dalman, 1912, 92
Central Edom	Petra	Al-Habta necropolis	Grave slab	Nabataean	N.060.37.02	II, 351										Brünnow/Domaszewski I, 1904, 808
Central Edom	Petra	Al-Habta	Votive	Nabataean	N.060.38.01	RES 1088 + 1436										Dalman, 1912, 85
Central Edom	Wadi Musa		Votive	Nabataean	N.064.01										3	Khairy/Milik 1981, 19–26
Central Edom								451, Da								NE Petra
Ḥismā	Auara (al-Ḥumaima)		Memorial	Nabataean	O.004.01											Graf 1992, 67–76
Ḥismā	Jabal Kharâza		Hydraulic building	Greek; Nabataean	O.006.01								1993 (IGLS XXI 4), 136			Kirkbride/Harding 1947, 19f.
Ḥismā	Wadi Ramm(Iram)		Votive	Nabataean	O.019.01											Savignac 1933, 1
Ḥismā	Wadi Ramm(Iram)		Votive	Nabataean	O.019.02											Savignac 1933, 2
Ḥismā	Wadi Ramm(Iram)		Visitor	Nabataean	O.019.03											Savignac/Horsfield 1935, 265–268, 1
Ḥismā	Wadi Ramm(Iram)		Memorial	Nabataean; Greek	O.019.04							8 (1937) 348	1993 (IGLS XXI 4), 5, 141			Savignac/Horsfield 1935, 263–265, 1
Ḥismā	Wadi Ramm(Iram)		Memorial	Greek	O.019.05							8 (1937) 346	1993 (IGLS XXI 4), 139			Savignac 1933, 2
Ḥismā	Hudaib al-Falâ, Ḥismâ		Memorial	Nabataean	O.029.01											Jobling 1982, 5
Ḥismā	Hudaib al-Falâ, Ḥismâ		Inscription	Greek	O.029.02							40 (1990) 1524	1993 (IGLS XXI 4), 138			
Midian	Ruwafa	Ruwafa inscriptions	Votive	Nabataean; Greek	P.011.01							36 (1986) 1390				
Midian	Ruwafa	Ruwafa inscriptions	Votive	Nabataean	P.011.02											
Hijaz	Dumat al-Jandal		Votive	Nabataean	Q.010.01											Savignac (†)/Starcky 1957, 196–217
Hijaz	Dumat al-Jandal		Funerary	Nabataean	Q.010.02											Winnett/Reed 1970, 16
Hijaz	Dumat al-Jandal		Memorial	Nabataean	Q.010.03											Al-Theeb 1994, 34–37
Hijaz	Dumat al-Jandal		Memorial	Nabataean	Q.010.04											Al-Theeb 1994, 36–39
Hijaz	Ṣīl		Memorial	Nabataean	Q.013.01	II, 338										
Hijaz	Tayma		Votive	Nabataean	Q.018.01	II, 336, RES 1282										
Hijaz	al-Ḥab al-Arabī		Memorial	Nabataean	Q.020.01	RES 2126 bis			II, 334							
Hijaz	Ṣaqâṣiq al-Ḍib		Memorial	Nabataean	Q.031.01				II, 321							
Hijaz	Hegra		Funerary	Nabataean	Q.047.01	II, 197	79	451, Db1	8					1993, H 8		
Hijaz	Hegra		Funerary	Nabataean	Q.047.02	II, 198, RES 2015	80	451, Db2	16					1993, H 16	7	
Hijaz	Hegra		Funerary	Nabataean	Q.047.03	II, 199	81	452, Db3	1					1993, H 1		
Hijaz	Hegra		Funerary	Nabataean	Q.047.04	II, 217, RES 1151 + 1290			31					1993, H 31		
Hijaz	Hegra		Funerary	Nabataean	Q.047.05	II, 200			30					1993, H 30		Winnett/Reed 1970, 79
Hijaz	Hegra		Funerary	Nabataean	Q.047.06	II, 201	82	452, Db4	29					1993, H 29		
Hijaz	Hegra		Funerary	Nabataean	Q.047.07	II, 206	86	453, Db6	19					1993, H 19		
Hijaz	Hegra		Funerary	Nabataean	Q.047.08	II, 209	89	453, Db8	36					1993, H 36	8	
Hijaz	Hegra		Funerary	Nabataean	Q.047.09	II, 205, RES 1144 + 1287	85		12					1993, H 12		
Hijaz	Hegra		Funerary	Nabataean	Q.047.10	II, 211, RES 1148 + 1290			11					1993, H 11		
Hijaz	Hegra		Funerary	Nabataean	Q.047.11	II, 213	91	454, Db10	24					1993, H 24		
Hijaz	Hegra		Funerary	Nabataean	Q.047.12	II, 214			32					1993, H 32		
Hijaz	Hegra		Funerary	Nabataean	Q.047.13	II, 219, RES 1153 + 1288			4					1993, H 4		
Hijaz	Hegra		Funerary	Nabataean	Q.047.14	RES 1108 + 1293			38					1993, H 38		
Hijaz	Hegra		Funerary	Nabataean	Q.047.15				22					176f., 22 ?		
Hijaz	Hegra		Funerary	Nabataean; Arabic; Thamudic	Q.047.16	II, 271, RES 1175 + 1291			17						12	Winnett/Reed 1970, 91
Hijaz	Hegra		Funerary	Nabataean	Q.047.17										13	Altheim/Stiehl V 1, 1968, 305–309
Hijaz	Hegra		Cult	Nabataean	Q.047.18	II, 234			40							Winnett/Reed 1970, 57
Hijaz	Hegra		Memorial	Nabataean	Q.047.19	II, 287			84							
Hijaz	Hegra		Memorial	Greek	Q.047.20				II, 14–17							
Hijaz	Hegra		Votive	Nabataean	Q.047.21	II, 218, RES 1152	92	454, Db12	39							
Hijaz	Hegra		Inscribed coin	Nabataean	Q.047.22											Meshorer 1975, 87
Hijaz	Maqûd al-Jundî		Memorial	Nabataean	Q.051.01				II, 226f.; II, 246							
Hijaz	Qubûr al-Jundî		Memorial	Greek; Latin	Q.053.01				II, 5–8, 10			38 (1988) 1663–1668				
Hijaz	al-Ula		Funerary	Nabataean	Q.055.01	II, 332	78							245		
Hijaz	al-Ula		Funerary	Nabataean	Q.055.02				II, 386							CIJ II, 1423
Hijaz	Hegra					II, 202	83									Hegra
Hijaz	Hegra					II, 204	84	452, Db5								Hegra
Hijaz	Hegra					II, 207	87	453, Db7								Hegra
Hijaz	Hegra					II, 208	88									Hegra
Hijaz	Hegra					II, 212	90	454, Db9								Hegra
Hijaz	Hegra					II, 221	93	454, Db11								Hegra
South Arabia	Ṣaʿîb ʿAmmâṣ		Memorial	Nabataean	R.a.01											Macdonald 1994, 132–141
South Arabia	Najrân		Memorial	South Arabian	R.b.01											Philby/Tritton 1944, 103, 153a
Egypt		Tell esh-Shuqafiya Nabataean inscriptions	Votive	Nabataean	S.001.01											
Egypt		Tell esh-Shuqafiya Nabataean inscriptions	Votive	Nabataean	S.001.02										14	
Egypt	Abû Darâj		Memorial	Nabataean	S.003.01											Littmann/Meredith 1953, 46a
Egypt			Papyrus document	Greek	S.a.01											Zenon PSI 406
Western shore of the Dead Sea	Wadi Murabbaʿat (Nahal Hever)		Papyrus document (loan contract)	Nabataean	V.004.01										10	Starcky 1954, 161–181
Western shore of the Dead Sea	Wadi Murabbaʿat (Nahal Hever)		Papyrus document (council decision)	Greek	V.004.02											Lewis 1989, 12
Western shore of the Dead Sea	Wadi Murabbaʿat (Nahal Hever)		Papyrus document (court summons)	Greek	V.004.03											Lewis 1989, 14
Western shore of the Dead Sea	Wadi Murabbaʿat (Nahal Hever)		Papyrus document (sworn declaration)	Greek	V.004.04											Lewis 1978, 100–114
Western shore of the Dead Sea	Wadi Murabbaʿat (Nahal Hever)		Papyrus document (sale contract)	Greek	V.004.05											Lewis 1989, 22
Western shore of the Dead Sea					TSSI 11										11	TSSI 11
Central and southern Negev	Elusa (Haluza)		Votive	Nabataean	X.008.01										1	Woolley/Lawrence [1915], 145f.
Central and southern Negev	Elusa (Haluza)		Building	Greek	X.008.02											Negev 1981a, 92
Central and southern Negev	ʿEn ʿAvdat		Memorial	Nabataean; Arabic	X.081.01											Negev et al. 1986, 56–60
Central and southern Negev	Oboda(Avdat)		Votive	Nabataean	X.088.01											Negev 1961, 8
Central and southern Negev	Oboda(Avdat)		Votive	Nabataean	X.088.02											Negev 1963, 10
Central and southern Negev	Oboda(Avdat)		Building	Nabataean	X.088.03											Negev 1963, 11
Central and southern Negev	Oboda(Avdat)		Votive	Nabataean	X.088.04											Negev 1961, 1
Central and southern Negev	Oboda(Avdat)		Votive	Greek	X.088.05							28 (1978) 1373				
Central and southern Negev	Oboda(Avdat)		Building	Greek	X.088.06							28 (1978) 1370				ALT 1921, 145
Central and southern Negev	Oboda(Avdat)		Building	Greek	X.088.07											Negev 1981a, 7
Central and southern Negev	al-Maḥalla (ʿEn Saharonim)		Votive	Greek; Latin	X.256.01											Figueras 1992, 177
Sinai	Wadi l-Maḥâra		Memorial	Nabataean	Z.025.01											Negev 1967a, 2
Sinai	Wadi l-Ḥafâf		Memorial	Greek	Z.030.01	II, 964, RES 129 + 2019										Negev 1977b, 98.III/230
Sinai	Wadi Mukatteb		Memorial	Nabataean	Z.037.01											Stone (Hg.) I, 1992, 2130
Sinai	Wadi Mukatteb		Memorial	Nabataean	Z.037.02	II, 963, RES 128										Stone (Hg.) I, 1992, 2129
Sinai							103									NSI Sinai Eut 519
Sinai							104									NSI Sinai Eut 559
Sinai							106									NSI Sinai Eut 186
Sinai							107									NSI Sinai Eut 463
Sinai								455–457,1-40								NE Sinai Eut+Leps

== Types of inscriptions ==
Nabataean inscriptions cover a range of social, religious, and economic contexts:

- Funerary inscriptions are among the most significant, especially those from Hegra (Mada'in Salih), which include dated tomb inscriptions referring to Nabataean kings
- Graffiti constitute the majority of the corpus; these are usually brief texts carved on rock surfaces, often consisting only of personal names or short phrases.
- Dedicatory inscriptions record offerings to deities such as Dushara and Al-'Uzza.
- Building inscriptions commemorate construction or restoration of temples, tombs, and public works.
- Legal and documentary texts are primarily known from papyri (e.g. the Babatha archive), including contracts, deeds, and administrative records.

== Papyrus and leather ==
Below is a list of all known Nabataean papyri and leather fragments:

Source	Date discovered	Date first published	ID	Description	Date
Starkey (Wadi Seiyal) = XḤev/Se nab 1	1951-53	1954	P. Yadin 36 + XḤev/Se nab 1	Redemption of writ of seizure	59-65
Wadi Murabbaʿat	???	1961	P. Mur. 71	Unclassified fragment	c.100 CE?
Wadi Seiyal	1951-53	1993	XḤev/Se nab 2	Sale contract	80-90 CE?
Wadi Seiyal	1951-53	1993	XḤev/Se nab 3	Contract	Unknown
Wadi Seiyal	1951-53	1993	XḤev/Se nab 4	Contract	Unknown
Wadi Seiyal	1951-53	1993	XḤev/Se nab 5	Contract	Unknown
Wadi Seiyal	1951-53	1993	XḤev/Se nab 6	Unclassified fragment	Unknown
Wadi Seiyal	1951-53	1993	XḤev/Se gr 64	Signature on Greek legal text	129
Wadi Seiyal	1951-53	1993	XḤev/Se gr 62	Signature on Greek legal text	127
Qumran Caves	???	1997	4Q235 frags a + b (leather)	Unclassified fragments	Unknown
Qumran Caves	???	1997	4Q343 (leather)	Letter	Unknown
Cave of Letters	1961	2002	P. Yadin 1	Debenture	92-93
Cave of Letters	1961	2002	P. Yadin 2	Sale contract	97-98
Cave of Letters	1961	2002	P. Yadin 3	Sale contract	97-98
Cave of Letters	1961	2002	P. Yadin 4	Guarantor’s agreement	97-98
Cave of Letters	1961	2002	P. Yadin 6	Tenancy agreement	119
Cave of Letters	1961	2002	P. Yadin 9	Waiver?	122
Cave of Letters	1961	2002		Unclassified fragments	Early 100s CE
Cave of Letters	1961	2002	P. Yadin 38	Fragment with signature of witness	Unknown
Cave of Letters	1961	2002	P. Yadin 39	Unclassified fragment	c.100 CE?
Cave of Letters	1961	2002	P. Yadin 15	Subscription on Greek legal text	125
Cave of Letters	1961	2002	P. Yadin 22	Subscription on Greek legal text	130
Oxyrhynchus, Egypt	1905	2004	Bodleian frag. MS Heb.d.89 (P)	Fragment of sale contract	Early 100s CE

== Locations ==
The locations of known Nabataean inscriptions are as follows:

Sites with Nabataean monuments — statistics (1986) Stated total in source: 1,300 sites
Code	Region	Number of sites
Region A	Sites outside the Nabataeans’ inhabited world	11
B	Damascus region	4
C	El-Lejja	7
D	Harra	2
E	Jabal al-Druze	11
F	Southern Auranitis	40
G	Eastern Jordanian Desert	8
H	Decapolis	11
I	Ammonitis	7
J	Perea	10
K	Northern Moabitis	66
L	Southern Moabitis	122
M	Northern Edom	104
N	Central Edom	133
O	El-Hesma	43
P	Midian	26
Q	Northwestern Arabia	71
QA	Wadi Sirhan	15
QB	Duma–Ha’il	3
QC	Ha’il–Tayma	5
QD	Tayma–Hegra	16
QE	Tabuk–Hegra	12
QF	Hegra–Dedan	11
QG	Tayma–Najran	9
R	Southern Arabia	3
S	Egypt	15
T	Southeastern shore of the Dead Sea	10
U	Arabah	22
V	Western shore of the Dead Sea	8
W	Judean Highlands and northern Negev	12
X	Central and southern Negev	≥474
Y	Northern Sinai	≥10
Z	(Southern) Sinai	≥70

== Gallery ==
Hauran inscription, CIS II 165, Louvre AO 4988

National Museum of Saudi Arabia

National Museum of Saudi Arabia

National Museum of Saudi Arabia

National Museum of Saudi Arabia

Hegra sundial in the Museum of the Ancient Orient

== See also ==
- Nabataean Kingdom
- Nabataean alphabet
- Aramaic inscriptions
- Arabic alphabet
- Inscriptions grecques et latines de la Syrie – Collection of ancient Greek and Latin inscriptions from the Levant
- Pre-Islamic Arabian inscriptions

== Bibliography ==
- Hackl, Ursula; Jenni, Hanna; Schneider, Christoph (2003). Quellen zur Geschichte der Nabatäer. Novum Testamentum et Orbis Antiquus (NTOA), Volume 51. Göttingen: Vandenhoeck & Ruprecht.
- Lewis, Norman Nicholson; MacDonald, Michael Christopher Archibald; Clackson, S.; Hoyland, R.G.; Sartre, Maurice (2003). "W.J.Bankes and the identification of the Nabataean script". Syria (in French). 80 (1): 41–110. doi:10.3406/syria.2003.7778. ISSN 0039-7946.
- Sánchez, Francisco del Río (2015-12-04). Nabatu. The Nabataeans through their inscriptions. Edicions Universitat Barcelona. ISBN 978-84-475-3748-8.
- Macdonald, M. C. A. (1998). "Some Reflections on Epigraphy and Ethnicity in the Roman Near East". Mediterranean Archaeology. 11. Meditarch: 177–190. ISSN 1030-8482. JSTOR 24667869.
- Petrantoni, Giuseppe (2021). Corpus of Nabataean Aramaic-Greek inscriptions (PDF). Venezia: Edizioni Ca' Foscari. ISBN 978-88-6969-507-0.
- Larison, Kristine M. (2020). ""Prolific Writing": Retracing a Desert Palimpsest in the South Sinai". In A. Hoffmann (ed.). Exodus: Border Crossings in Jewish, Christian and Islamic Texts and Images. Judaism, Christianity, and Islam – Tension, Transmission, Transformation. De Gruyter. pp. 77–92. doi:10.1515/9783110618549-005. ISBN 978-3-11-061854-9. S2CID 214051677.
- Avraham Negev, The Inscriptions of Wadi Haggag, Sinai, Jerusalem 1977 (Qedem, 6), esp. 73-80
- Healey, John F. (2011). "On Stone and Papyrus: reflections on Nabataean epigraphy". Palestine Exploration Quarterly. 143 (3). Informa UK Limited: 163–165. doi:10.1179/003103211x13092562976054. ISSN 0031-0328. S2CID 162206051.
- Healey, John F. (2004). "A Nabataean Papyrus Fragment (Bodleian MS Heb. d. 89)". Zeitschrift für Papyrologie und Epigraphik. 146. Dr. Rudolf Habelt GmbH, Bonn (Germany): 183–188. ISSN 0084-5388. JSTOR 20191766.
- Healey, J. F. (1993). The Nabataean Tomb Inscriptions of Mada’in Salih. Journal of Semitic Studies Supplement. Vol. 1. Oxford.
- al-Khraysheh, F. (1986). Die Personennamen in den nabatäischen Inschriften des Corpus Inscriptionum Semiticarum. Marburg: Philipps-Universität.
