= Umm el-Jimal =

Umm el-Jimal أم الجمال
- Village
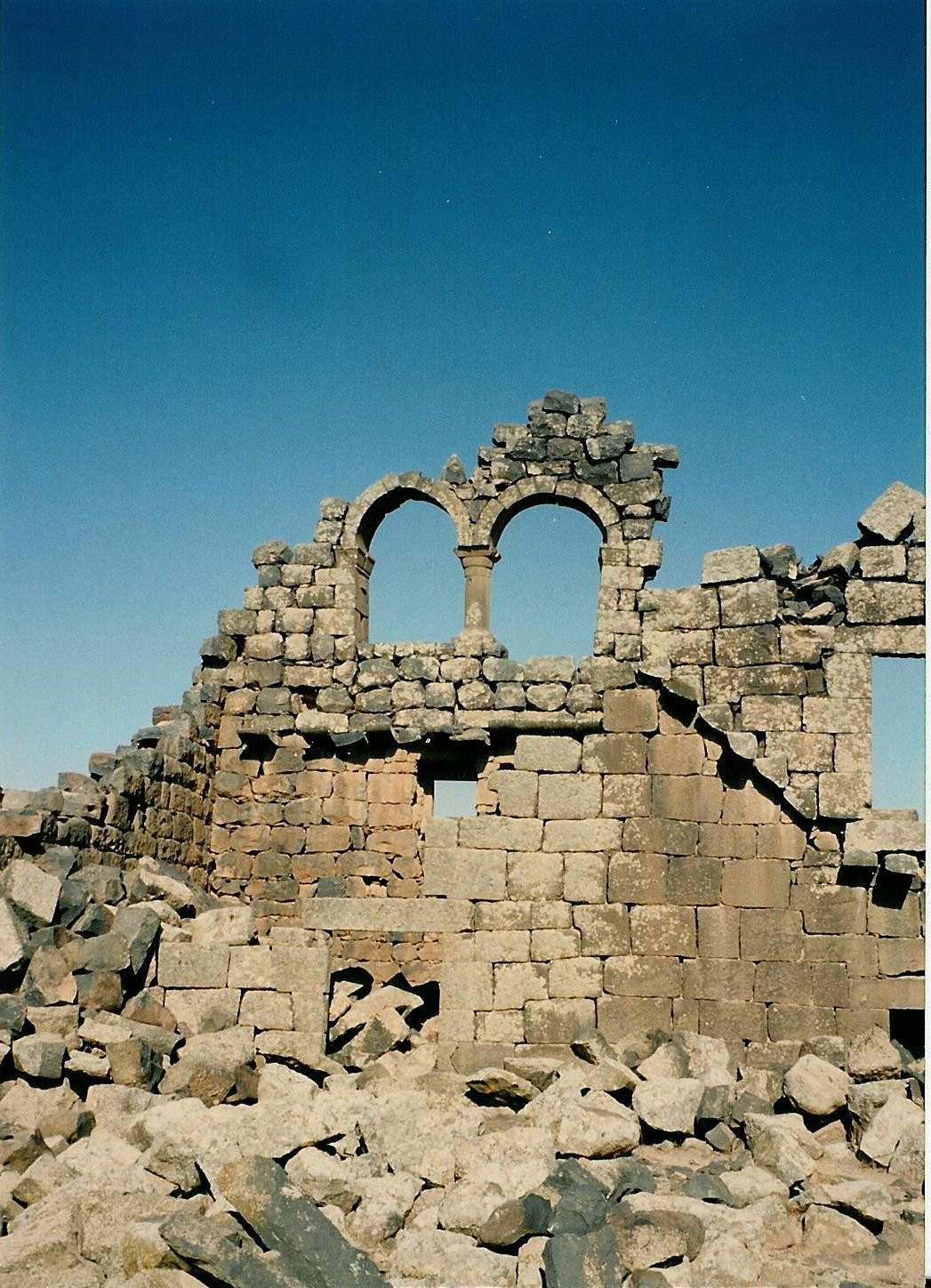
- The double window of House XVIII in Umm el-Jimal

- Location within Jordan
- Coordinates: 32°19′36″N 36°22′11″E
- Country: Jordan
- Governorate: Mafraq Governorate

UNESCO World Heritage Site
- Official name: Umm Al-Jimāl
- Criteria: Cultural: (iii)
- Designated: 2024 (46th session)
- Reference no.: 1721
- Region: Arab States

Umm el-Jimal (Arabic: ام الجمال, "Mother of Camels"), also rendered as Umm ej Jemāl, Umm al-Jimal or Umm idj-Djimal, is a village in northern Jordan approximately 17 kilometers east of Mafraq. It is primarily notable for the substantial ruins of a Byzantine and early Islamic town which are clearly visible above the ground, as well as an older Roman village (locally referred to as al-Herri) located to the southwest of the Byzantine ruins.

== Overview ==
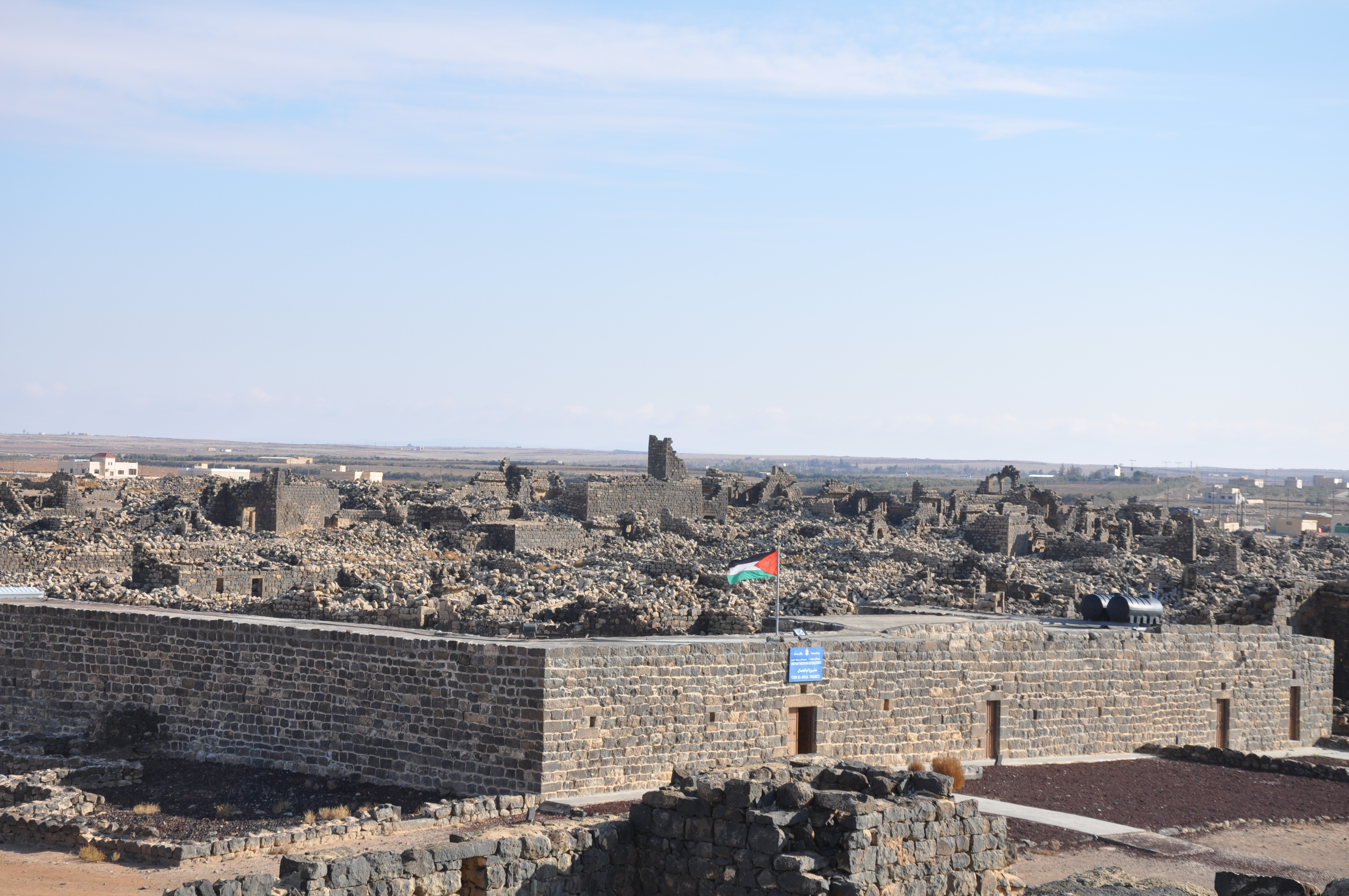
The ruins from atop the barracks

Umm el-Jimal is a large village located in northern Jordan less than 10 km (6.2 mi) from the Syrian border. It is located in the Hauran, the northern desert region of the country. Despite this aridity, Umm el-Jimal is surprisingly well suited for agriculture, and its livelihood and economy is largely derived from agricultural and pastoral sustenance. The ruins of an ancient village lie in the midst of modern Umm el-Jimal. The ruins date from the Nabataean through the Abbasid periods. The earthquake circa 749 did major damage, but the community survived well into the Abbasid period. In the early 20th century the area was repopulated by the Druze and then the Bedouin Msa'eid tribe.

== History ==
=== Prehistory ===
Little is known of pre-historical times in Umm el-Jimal, aside from the few scattered remains of what appear to be settlements of nomadic hunter-gatherer tribes. In some of these places it is possible to find chert knapping stones and some prehistoric tools. In the nearby wadis the remains of kites, which are large animal traps, have been found. The prehistoric people would have used these to catch large groups of animals at once.

=== Nabataean ===
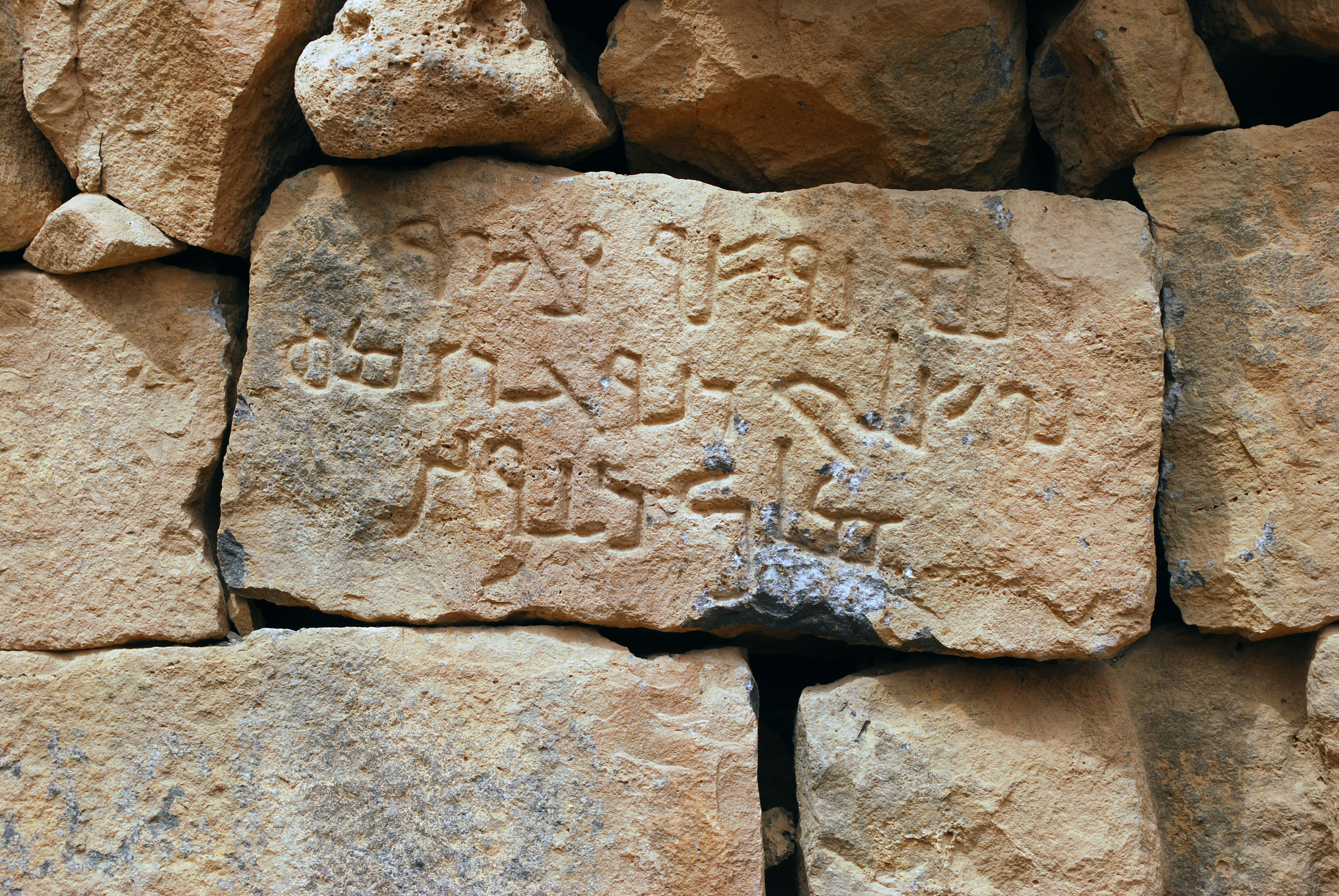
Nabataean inscription c. 265 showing signs of transitioning to Arabic. It mentions Fihr, teacher to King Gadhima of the Tanukh

The Nabataean peoples were the first to build permanent homesteads in the area in the first century AD. The settlement was mainly a farming community and a trading outpost dependent on Bostra, the nearby capital of the Nabataeans. Though the evidence for this village survives only in fragments, there are numerous Nabataean inscriptions from this period, mostly tomb stones. At least two men mentioned on these served as members of the Bostra City Council.

=== Early Roman ===
As the Romans continued their conquest of the surrounding areas, the Nabataean king saw his state's demise as inevitable, so he ceded his kingdom to the Roman emperor Trajan in AD 106. The Romans named the newly acquired territory Provincia Arabia and promptly set up local governments. The Praetorium, so named by H. C. Butler in 1905, may have been built for this purpose in the third century AD.

=== Late Roman ===
Everything changed after the rebellion led by Queen Zenobia of Palmyra in 275. The local people were no longer allowed to govern themselves, but had to submit to harsh foreign rule. Due to its location on the fringe of the Empire, Umm el-Jimal became a military outpost complete with a garrison and a new Tetrarchic-era fort. As Roman imperial power began to diminish, this earlier castellum lost its military function, and Umm el-Jimal gradually transformed from a military station to a civilian town. Paradoxically, from the point of view of the local Arab residents of the Hauran, this change may have been viewed as liberation rather than decline.

=== Byzantine ===
The Roman provincial administrators were replaced by Byzantine rulers in the 5th century. One of the rulers, Dux Pelagius, built smaller military quarters. These quarters were the later castellum, which is now known as the Barracks. As the local population gradually converted to Christianity the town reemerged as a prosperous agricultural and trading community. The 150 houses still standing today were constructed in this period, the fifth and sixth centuries. In the sixth century there was an explosion of church construction, 15 of which can still be seen today. The population continued to grow, reaching an estimated 6,000 inhabitants. In the seventh century, however, power of the region was ceded to the Islamic Umayyad Empire.

=== Umayyad ===
The Islamic era at Umm el-Jimal began in 640 when the Rashidun Caliphs took control of the area. Much remodeling was done throughout the site so as to repurpose buildings to suit their own needs. The Praetorium and House XVIII are examples of buildings repurposed as dwelling places, while House 53 was possibly repurposed into a mosque. Despite all of this, the population decreased and the site was slowly abandoned with the help of an earthquake in circa 749 that destroyed many buildings and set much of the architecture off balance. The site was completely deserted under the Abbasid Caliphs in the ninth century.

=== Arab Revolt ===
T. E. Lawrence wrote of "ruined Um el Jemal", "There seemed evidence of bluntness of mind in these Roman frontier cities, Um el Jemal, Um el Surab, Umtaiye. Such incongruous buildings, in what was then and now a desert cockpit, accused their builders of insensitiveness; almost of a vulgar assertion of man's right (Roman right) to live unchanged in all his estate."

== Religion ==
=== Nabataean ===
There are a number of altars to Nabataean gods located on the site of Petra, including Dushara Aarra. Dushara, a god of Petra, is linked to Aarra, the patron god of Bostra, who become a unique regional deity. Both the Nabataean and Greek versions of his name can be seen inscribed on the die (middle section) of an altar, found in the western area of the ruins. Another god present at the site is Zeus Epikoos, a mixture of Zeus and the local deity Epikoos. In this case an altar was found in a courtyard, representative of a regional god. The altar found at Umm el-Jimal suggests personal devotion by a local resident to this deity. The third deity found at Umm el-Jimal is Solmos, who is not known elsewhere and may also be a local deity, perhaps only worshipped by the people of Umm el-Jimal and the immediate surrounding area. His name is found only once, on an altar inscription in the main ruins of Umm el-Jimal. Because this is the only known evidence of the worship of Solmos, it is reasonable to believe his worshipers were relatively few and localized. There is evidence on tombstones and small altars scattered throughout the site that suggests the worship of other deities, perhaps personal or familial gods not worshiped communally.

=== Early Roman Pagan ===
Due to the tolerant nature of the early Roman occupation, little was contested during this period. The people of the region were able to continue their religious practices they had followed prior to the Roman occupation. Thus, it is likely that many of the regional gods like Zeus Epikoos and Solmos were still worshiped as the local deities.

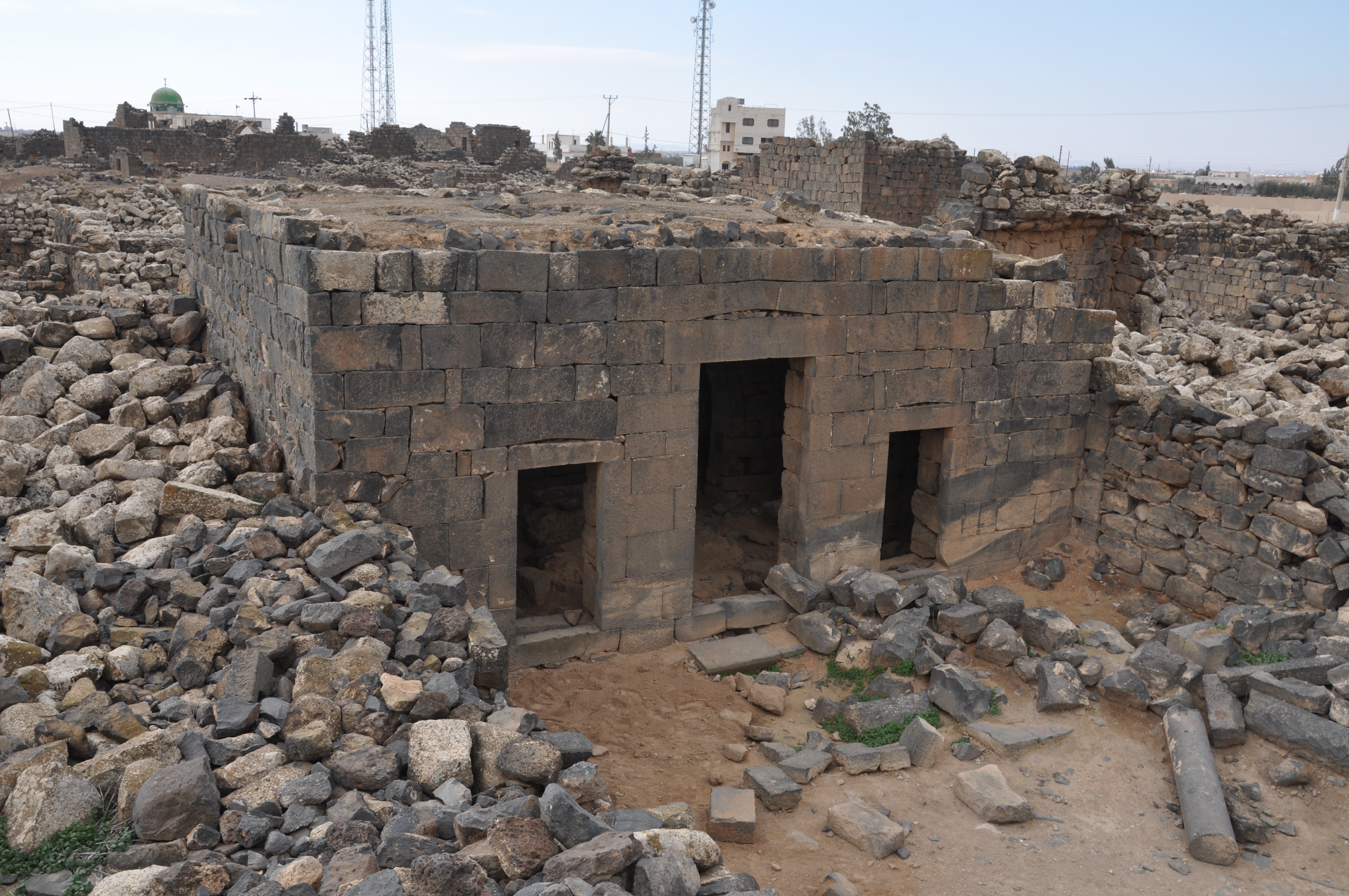
Late Roman Temple

=== Late Roman ===
After the rebellion of Palmyra most of the regional religious practices stopped altogether. This was due to harsh restrictions that were implemented by the Roman government to ensure that the people would not rise up again. There is evidence however, that a small Roman shrine surviving in House 49 may have served the garrison that was stationed in the Tetrarchic castellum.

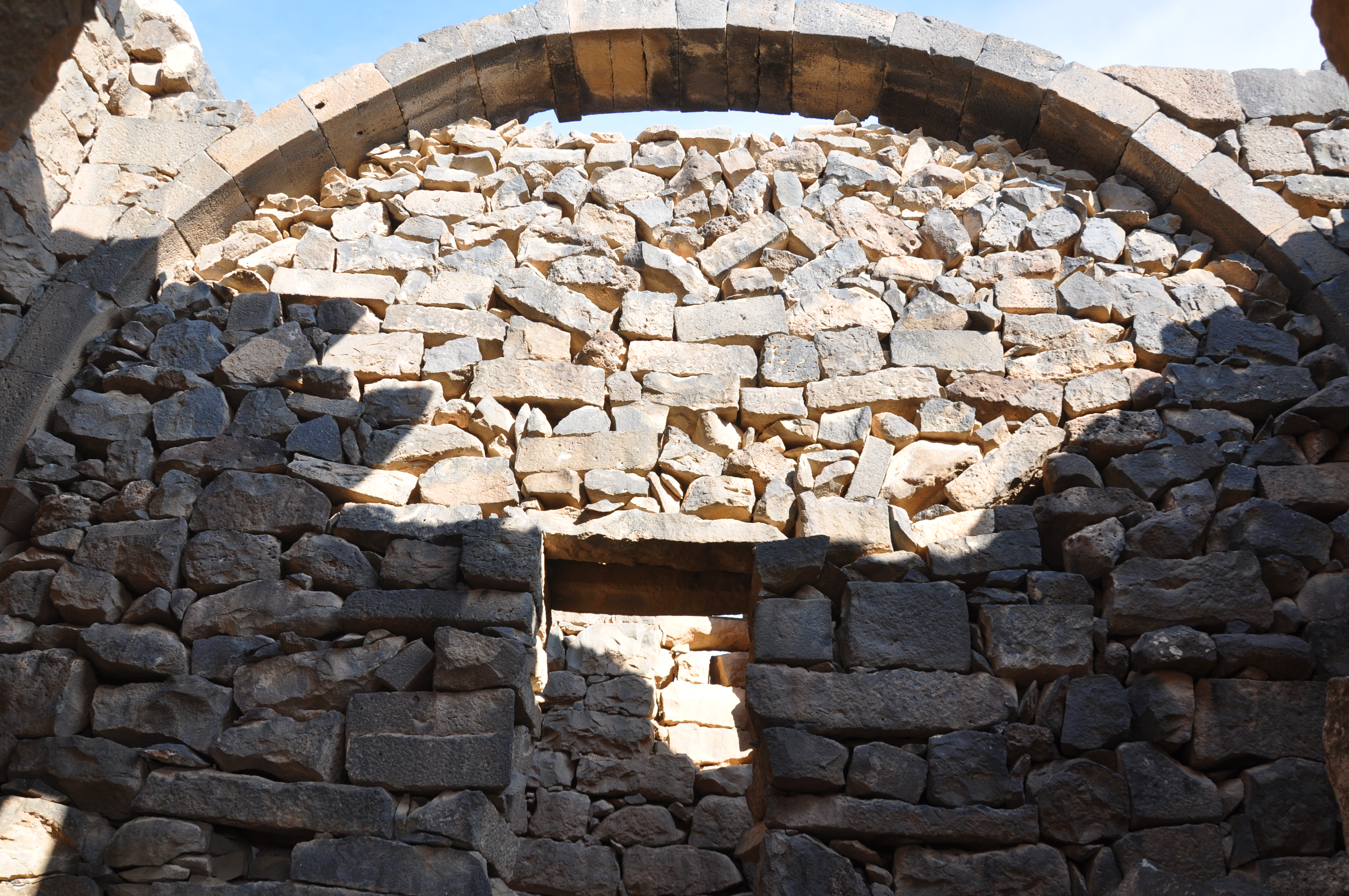
Late Roman Temple

=== Christianity/Byzantium ===
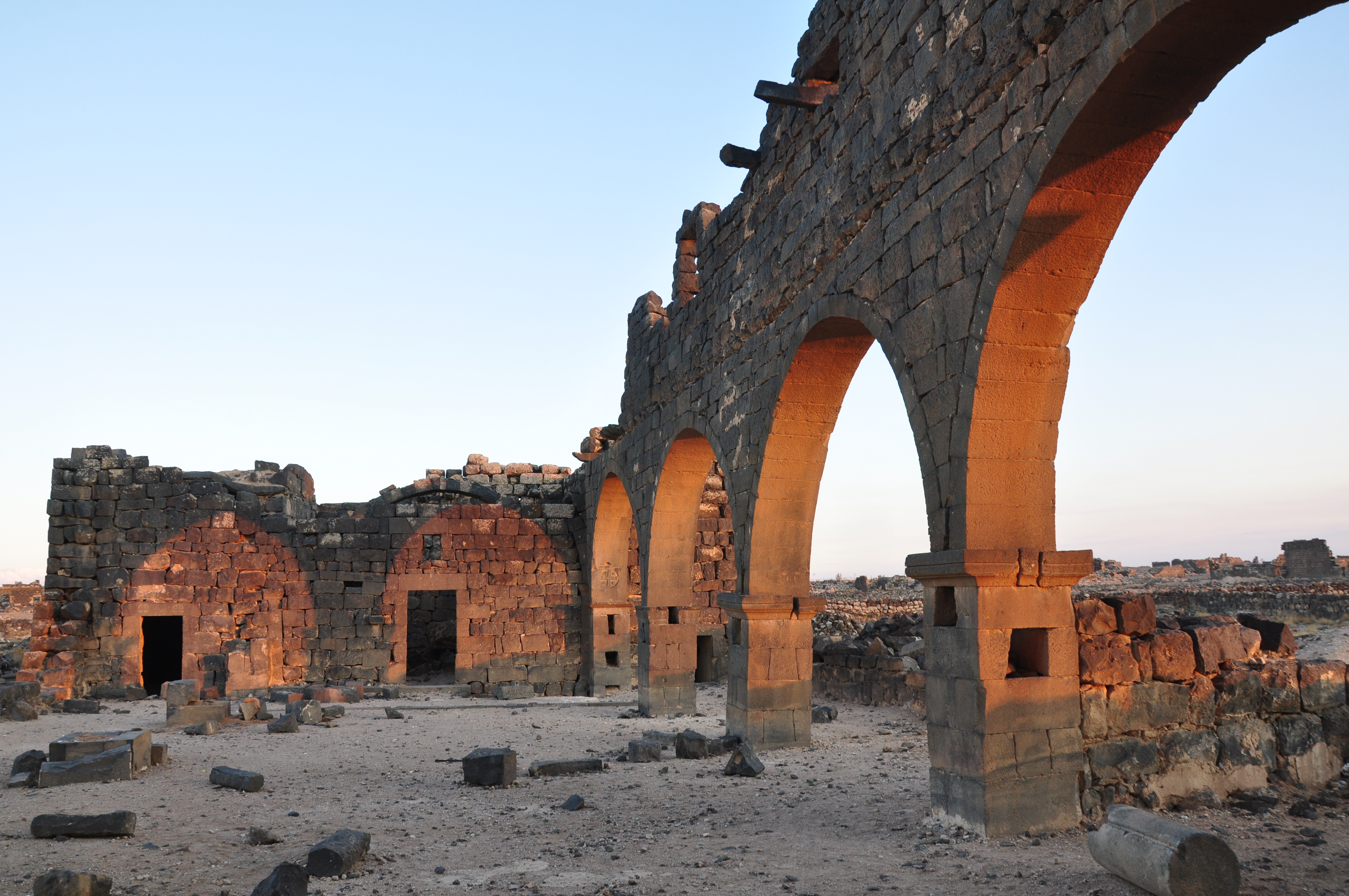
The West Church

The Byzantine Empire is representative of the Christianization of the Roman Empire by Constantine in the early fourth century AD. The change in religious affiliation influenced even the far reaches of the Empire, and is therefore evident here in Umm el-Jimal. Christian symbols can be found throughout the site carved into stone and by the architectural influences. The doctrinal shift in clergy-laity (parishioner) relations is represented by the addition of altar screens in the front of the churches and narthexes to their entries. Besides Christianity's influence through the construction of multiple churches on the site, some complexes may have had monastic use. The later castellum (Barracks) was converted into a monastery by the addition of a chapel to the main building. The towers, which were also added, are inscribed with the names of the four archangels and other Christian inscriptions. The inscriptions give the impression that these successful residents relied for protection more directly on God, to whom they felt close, rather than on an emperor who seemed so far away.

=== Islam ===
Umayyad Umm el-Jimal appears to have been part Christian and part Muslim with the two religious groups coexisting under the policy of the Dhimma. Scholars debate the idea that some of the churches in Umm el-Jimal were converted into mosques. In these former churches, the apse was blocked off and the focus of the structure's space was shifted south towards Mecca. Whether this is the case or not, it is more evident that two houses were converted to mosques with typically Umayyad plans and a small tower on the exterior of its west face indicating the presence of a minaret. The predominant Muslim modern community is served by several newly constructed mosques outside the antiquities.

== Location ==
The village of Umm el-Jimal is located in the semi-arid region of Jordan known as the Southern Hauran, at the western edge of the desert Badiya region. The area consists mainly of the igneous rock basalt, which was used as the primary building material. Basalt also served as a natural insulation which was extremely important in the area. In the cool winter months the basalt blocks would trap the heat from the sun and then radiate that heat throughout the structure, thus acting as a natural heating source. In the hot summer months it would serve as a cooling unit because the dense nature of the blocks trapped the cool air within the structure, despite the fact that temperatures exceed 100 °F. The volcanic nature of the soil has made it one of the most fertile areas in Jordan and Syria.

== Demographics ==
The estimated population during the Nabataean period is unknown, because evidence of a residential community was obliterated by the later construction phases. However, because the town was likely a major trading post along the same route as Bostra, the population could have been several thousand strong. Numerous Nabataean and Greek tombstones testify to their presence. Based on the number of structures, the peak population was likely in the sixth century perhaps 3,000–7,000 people. In the Byzantine and Umayyad periods houses were occupied by both people and pastoral animals. In the Umayyad period a smaller number survived at Umm el-Jimal. While some buildings were not occupied, it was still a prosperous place and some new farmstead-type houses were constructed with characteristic Umayyad mangers. By 900, the town was abandoned. It is unknown as to why, but it was most likely due to the same reasons that the greater population of the wider region of Syria decreased; i.e., plague, drought, earthquakes, etc. Aside from these basic numbers, the general range of poor to wealthy households is largely unknown for most of the different eras of occupation. The location of the site suggests that it was rather small, but the number of buildings and churches suggest otherwise.

== Archaeology ==
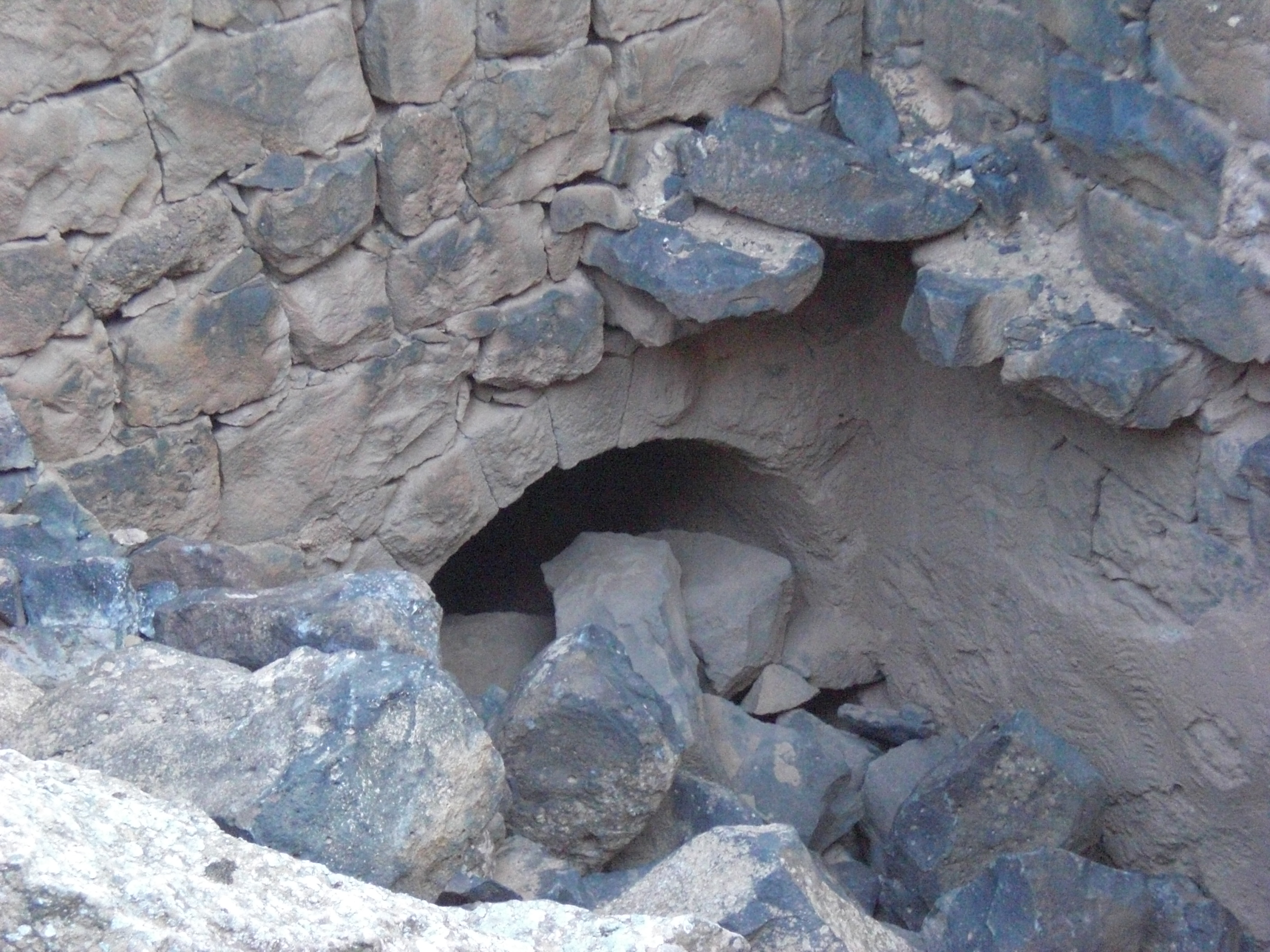
Excavation site C2

Umm el-Jimal was rediscovered in the nineteenth century, during a time of Western interest in antiquities. The first systematic survey was completed by the Princeton University Expedition to Southern Syria in 1905 and 1909. The first recorded visit to the site was by William John Bankes (1786–1855) in 1818 who conducted a brief description of Umm el-Jimal. Between 1818 and 1905, many Westerners passed through the site and made a few recordings but all were brief and inconclusive. Howard Crosby Butler led the Princeton Expedition and his papers (PES II: 151) contain a more exhaustive account of those who came to Umm el-Jimal between 1818 and 1905. Butler remained at the site for two weeks mapping the site and drawing diagrams of several of the buildings. Butler's work has proved invaluable in guiding others to the site and in garnering further interest in studying the site. His survey of 1905 provided the groundwork for the field work still being conducted today.

G. Corbett came to Umm el-Jimal in 1956 to study the Julianos Church and much of his work corrected the mistakes made by Butler. Corbett also refined how Umm el-Jimal is thought of today by demonstrating that many of the buildings were constructed reusing pieces from earlier buildings. In 1972 comprehensive work was started at Umm el-Jimal by Bert de Vries of Calvin College. The ancient village was further mapped out and detailed work conducted refining the theories surrounding the nature and history of the village. The work has included conservation practices. In 1977, the walls of the Barracks were fortified with cement to prevent more collapse. The gate area of House XVIII was also fortified in 1983 with modern cement. Excavations were conducted during field work between 1972 and 1998, though the nature of the excavations was for survey and research and not for uncovering buried ruins. Since 1998 the work has centered on presentation and visual documentation of the site. Started in 2009, efforts are currently being conducted to make the site more presentable to the public. A significant component of this effort is the development of a virtual museum with site tours, a compilation of the research and publications, and presentation of the heritage of the modern community and its relationship to the antiquities.

In 2014, extensive damage was done to the site by tomb raiders. Sparked by rumors of gold, looters have destroyed many tombs. "The looters are looking not only for gold but for ceramics, glassware, lamps, masonry and bits of jewelry, all of which quickly find their way into the global antiquities trade."

== UNESCO World Heritage Site ==
A request for UNESCO world heritage status was submitted in 2022. In July 2024, Umm el-Jimal was admitted during the 46th session held in India.

== See also ==
- Khirbet es-Samra
- List of World Heritage Sites in Jordan
- Tourism in Jordan
