= Dousareios =

Roman philosopher

Dousareios, also known as Dousareios of Petra, was a 3rd-century Roman Neoplatonist philosopher of Arab origin from Arabia Nabataea. His name appears to be directly derived from the Nabataean god Dousares. Dousareios seems to be involved in several Neoplatonist disputes. Dousareios argues that gods must be involved in the naming of things, he also denies linguistic convention.
