= Inscriptions grecques et latines de la Syrie =

Collection of ancient Greek and Latin inscriptions from the Levant

Inscriptions grecques et latines de la Syrie (IGLS; English: 'Greek and Latin Inscriptions of Syria') is an international epigraphic research program and multi-volume scholarly corpus aimed at systematically collecting and publishing ancient Ancient Greek and Latin inscriptions of the Levant, including the territories of Syria, Lebanon, and Jordan. Founded in 1905, the project is ongoing, and the corpus serves as the a reference work for epigraphers, historians, and archaeologists working on the Hellenistic and Roman Levant. The volumes of IGLS have been published in Beirut by the Institut Français d'Archéologie de Beyrouth (IFAB) and currently by the Institut français du Proche-Orient (IFPO) within the Bibliothèque archéologique et historique (BAH) series since 1929.

== History ==
=== Background and creation ===
The systematic documentation of Greek and Latin inscriptions in the Levant began in the 19th century. Among the earliest travelers to copy inscriptions in the region were the Englishman Henry Maundrell, Alexander Drummond, the German Ulrich Jasper Seetzen, the Swiss Johann Ludwig Burckhardt, and the English antiquarian William John Bankes. These were followed by the more systematic work of the French orientalist Ernest Renan and William Waddington, the German expeditioners Rudolf Ernst Brünnow and Alfred von Domaszewski, the French missions of René Dussaud and Frédéric Macler, the Princeton University expeditions to northern and southern Syria at the turn of the 20th century, the joint Académie des Inscriptions et Belles-Lettres and Yale University excavations at Dura-Europos in the twenties and thirties of the 20th century, and the work at Palmyra by Henri Seyrig in the context of the Mandate-era Service des Antiquités, and from 1946, under the Direction générale des Antiquités de Syrie in collaboration with the Institut Français d'Archéologie de Beyrouth.

The roots of IGLS trace back to 1905, when father Louis Jalabert, a Jesuit priest at Beirut's Oriental Faculty, now Saint Joseph University, announced the initiative at the Archaeological Congress in Athens. Jalabert was motivated to incorporate the mass of new epigraphic discoveries accumulated, and aimed to update William Henry Waddington’s 1870 work, Inscriptions grecques et latines de la Syrie, which remained the fundamental epigraphic reference for ancient Syria for more than half a century. Jalabert had originally planned to collaborate with the German scholar Rudolf Ernst Brünnow on a broader corpus covering Syria, Palestine and Arabia, but Brünnow's death and the disruption of World War I left the plan incomplete. The project published its first volume in 1929; the first five volumes were completed by Father René Mouterde and other Jesuit scholars. Run jointly with the antiquities departments of Jordan, Lebanon, and Syria, the program is led by the director of the HiSoMA research center at Université Lumiere-Lyon 2. It brings together researchers from several universities and institutes, including the French Institute for the Near East (Ifpo), which has published the IGLS series in its Bibliothèque archéologique et historique (BAH) since the very beginning.

=== Publication history ===
The first volume of IGLS, covering Commagene and Cyrrhestica, was published in 1929 by Librairie Orientaliste Paul Geuthner in Paris as the twelfth volume of the Bibliothèque archéologique et historique (BAH). Subsequent volumes appeared steadily with IGLS 2, covering Chalcis ad Belum and the Antiochene region in 1939; IGLS 3 appeared in two fascicles in 1950 and 1953; and IGLS 4 and 5, covering Laodicene and Apamene, and Emesene respectively, appeared in 1955 and 1959, both with the collaboration of the French Jesuit scholar Claude Mondésert.

From 1960 onward, successive volumes were published in conformity with modern standards of epigraphic publication, including a critical apparatus, translations, photographs, facsimiles, and full indices. Jean-Paul Rey-Coquais contributed to the 1967 IGLS 6, covering Baalbek and the Beqaa Valley; and IGLS 7, covering Arwad and the neighboring region, in 1970. In 1980, Jean-François Breton published IGLS 8/3, devoted to Hadrian's forest inscriptions in Mount Lebanon. From 1982 onward, the French historians Maurice Sartre and Annie Sartre-Fauriat published a sequence of volumes covering Bosra and the Hauran, beginning with IGLS 13/1 in 1982. Julien Aliquot published IGLS 11 (Mount Hermon, 2008), working on a dossier originally assembled by Mouterde; and Jean-Baptiste Yon produced IGLS 17/1 on Palmyra in 2012. The Palmyrene material comprises 563 inscriptions from the city and its necropoleis, and informs about municipal life, notable families and their roles, the organisation of the Roman military, and the caravan trade that underpinned the city's wealth. Aliquot's IGLS 8/1 on Beirut and its region, the most recent volume, appeared in 2023. In this volume, Aliquot gathered 464 inscriptions from Beirut and around twenty rural sites on the Mediterranean coast and the western slopes of Mount Lebanon, covering the period from the city's colonial foundation to the reign of Justinian I.

== Scope ==
The IGLS encompasses all Greek and Latin inscriptions discovered within the boundaries of the Roman province of Syria in the broadest ancient sense of the toponym, including the Levantine Near East, extending from Commagene in the north to the Nabataean south, and from the Phoenician coastline to the Syrian steppe and Palmyra. Volumes are organized on a geographical and regional basis, proceeding systematically through the major cities and districts of the ancient Levant. Inscription types documented in the corpus include public and honorific dedications, epitaphs, building and foundation texts, milestone inscriptions, religious votive offerings, and administrative and legal documents, covering the Hellenistic, Roman and early Byzantine periods. The corpus also documents bilingual and trilingual inscriptions, especially Palmyrene inscriptions, where a substantial number of texts is composed in both Greek and Palmyrene Aramaic, with Latin sometimes serving as a third language.

== Published volumes ==
The below table lists the published volumes of the main series and the associated Inscriptions de la Jordanie sub-series.

Abbreviation	Author(s)	Geographical coverage	BAH no.	Year
IGLS 1	Jalabert, Mouterde	Commagène et Cyrrhestique (nos. 1–256)	12	1929
IGLS 2	Jalabert, Mouterde	Chalcidique et Antiochène (nos. 257–698)	32	1939
IGLS 3/1	Jalabert, Mouterde	Région de l'Amanus, Antioche (nos. 699–988)	46	1950
IGLS 3/2	Jalabert, Mouterde	Antioche, Antiochène (nos. 989–1242)	51	1953
IGLS 4	Jalabert, Mouterde, Mondésert	Laodicée, Apamène (nos. 1243–1997)	61	1955
IGLS 5	Jalabert, Mouterde, Mondésert	Émésène (nos. 1998–2710)	66	1959
IGLS 6	Rey-Coquais	Baalbek et Beqaʿ (nos. 2711–3017)	78	1967
IGLS 7	Rey-Coquais	Arados et régions voisines (nos. 4001–4061)	89	1970
IGLS 8/1	Aliquot	Beyrouth et sa région	225	2023
IGLS 8/3	Breton	Inscriptions forestières d'Hadrien dans le Mont-Liban	104	1980
IGLS 11	Aliquot	Mont Hermon (Liban et Syrie)	183	2008
IGLS 13/1	Sartre	Bostra (nos. 9001–9472)	113	1982
IGLS 13/2	Sartre, Sartre-Fauriat	Bostra (Suppl.) et la plaine de la Nuqrah	194	2011
IGLS 14/1–2	Sartre-Fauriat, Sartre	La Batanée et le Jawlān Oriental	207	2016
IGLS 15/1–2	Sartre-Fauriat, Sartre	Le plateau du Trachon et ses bordures	204	2014
IGLS 16/1–3	Sartre-Fauriat, Sartre	L'Auranitide (nos. 1–772a)	219–221	2020–2021
IGLS 17/1	Yon	Palmyre	195	2012
I. Jordanie 2	Gatier	Région centrale (Amman–Hesban–Madaba–Main–Dhiban)	114	1986
I. Jordanie 4	Sartre	Pétra et la Nabatène méridionale	115	1993
I. Jordanie 5/1	Bader	La Jordanie du Nord-Est	187	2009
