= René Mouterde =

French archaeologist and epigraphist (1880-1961)

- Born: 28 October 1880; Lyon, France
- Died: 27 December 1961 (aged 81); Beirut, Lebanon
- Scientific career
- Fields: Archaeology; epigraphy

Marie Léon René Mouterde (28 October 1880 – 27 December 1961) was a French Jesuit priest, archaeologist, and epigraphist. He worked on Greek and Latin inscriptions from Syria, Lebanon and Jordan and was one of the principal editors of the Inscriptions grecques et latines de la Syrie (IGLS).

== Life and career ==
Marie-Léon-René Mouterde was born in Lyon, France, on 28 October 1880. At eighteen, he entered the Society of Jesus, studied classical philology before pursuing theological and philosophical coursework. Following standard Jesuit educational practice, he temporarily suspended his studies to teach at the Saint Joseph University of Beirut.

Mouterde's initial work in epigraphy and archaeology developed during his appointment at Saint Joseph University in Beirut, where the Faculty of Oriental Studies had been established in 1902 as a center for philological, archaeological, and historical research. The faculty operated under the direction of Sébastien Ronzevalle, who held a corresponding membership with the Académie des Inscriptions et Belles-Lettres. Mouterde arrived in Beirut in 1905 at age twenty-five. Earlier scholars like Ernest Renan and Eugène-Melchior de Vogüé had conducted research in Syria and Lebanon during the 19th century. Saint Joseph University in Beirut established the first permanent group of archaeologists in the region, focusing on documenting and preserving scattered monuments and chance discoveries that were at risk of deterioration or loss.

Mouterde's primary scholarly contribution emerged through his collaboration with archeologist Louis Jalabert on Greek and Roman epigraphy. This partnership began after the 1905 Archaeological Congress in Athens approved plans for a new compilation of Syrian Greek and Latin inscriptions, intended to supersede Waddington's earlier work from the Second Empire period. Following Jalabert's return to France, Mouterde assumed responsibility for this project. Mouterde joined an established research team that included: Sébastien Ronzevalle, an archaeologist, and Louis Jalabert, an epigraphist. Together they documented numerous monuments, publishing their findings regularly in the Mélanges de la Faculté orientale (renamed Mélanges de l'Université Saint-Joseph in 1922). Their collective work became an essential source for understanding ancient Levant. Mouterde's scholarly output included specialized studies on regional archaeological findings, Byzantine artisanal inscriptions, ancient magical objects, lead sarcophagi, and Syrian religious practices. He additionally contributed research to publications on the Chalcis limes and archaeological studies of the ports of Tyre and Sidon.

Following his permanent return to Beirut in 1919, Mouterde occupied several administrative positions, including serving as Chancellor of the Faculty of Law at Saint Joseph University until 1942, and as the Founding Director of the Institute of Oriental Letters from 1937 to 1951. He was also the editor of the ''Mélanges de l'Université Saint-Joseph'' until 1961 and a professor of Phoenician and Syrian Greco-Roman history and archaeology. The Académie des Inscriptions et Belles-Lettres elected Mouterde as a corresponding member on 6 December 1940. He died in Beirut on 27 December 1961.

== Publications ==
Mouterde's principal epigraphic project was the Inscriptions grecques et latines de la Syrie (IGLS) a comprehensive collection of inscriptions from Lebanon, Jordan and Syria.

=== Selected works ===
- Inscriptions grecques conservées à l'Institut français de Damas" in Syria, 1925
- "Inscriptions grecques chrétiennes" (en collaboration avec L. Jalabert) in Dictionnaire d'archéologie chrétienne et de liturgie VII, 1926
- Inscriptions grecques et latines de la Syrie, 5 tomes en 6 vol., 1929-1959 (in collaboration with L. Jalabert et C. Mondésert)
- "Le glaive de Dardanos. Objets et inscriptions magiques de Syrie", in Mémoires de l'Université Saint-Joseph, 1930
- Précis d'histoire de la Syrie et du Liban, 1932
- Le Nahr el-Kelb (Fleuve du chien). Guide archéologique, 1932
- Le Limes de Chalcis. Organisation de la steppe en Haute-Syrie romaine, 1945, 2 vol. (in collaboration with A. Poidebard)
- Beyrouth, ville romaine, 1953 (in collaboration with Jean Lauffray).
