= Madaba Nabataean Inscriptions =

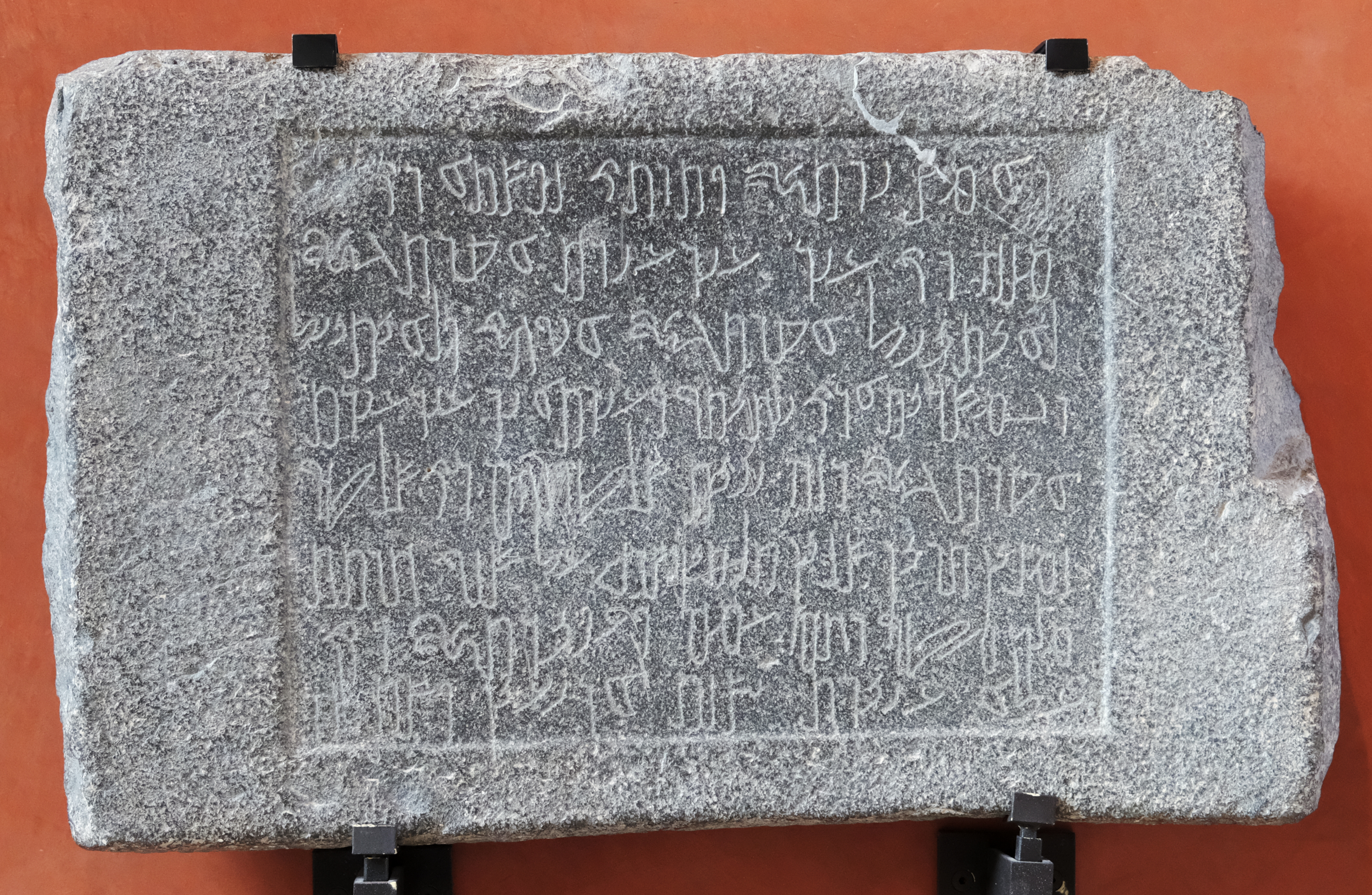
Louvre inscription AO4454

The Madaba Nabataean inscriptions are a pair of identical ancient Nabataean inscriptions carved in the Nabataean alphabet, discovered in the town of Madaba, Jordan. Dating to 37/38 CE during the reign of King Aretas IV, these inscriptions provide insight into the Nabataean civilization, particularly its language, administration, and funerary practices.

It is dedicated to two people named Artobel (also spelled Itaybel), grandfather and grandson, a Nabataean strategos (military governor) and camp commander respectively, and erected by Abdobodat, the son of the older Artobel and father of the younger Artobel.

The inscriptions provide evidence of Nabataean presence and influence in Madaba, shedding light on the roles of Nabataean officials, and reveal aspects of Nabataean funerary customs and the social status of the individuals commemorated.

The inscriptions are known by epigraphists as NSI 96 and CIS II 196.

== Discovery ==
=== Vatican Inscription ===
The first inscription was discovered in 1889 by local inhabitants of Madaba and brought to the attention of Marie-Joseph Lagrange the following year.

The inscription is currently located in the Vatican Museums, as part of the Lapidary Collection. It was donated to Pope Leo XIII in 1889 by the Latin Patriarchate of Jerusalem.

=== Louvre Inscription ===
The Louvre inscription was discovered in 1906, and sent to the Louvre by Charles Simon Clermont-Ganneau. It is displayed in Room 314.

Clermont-Ganneau wrote that the text was "absolutely identical" to that of the other version.

== Inscription ==
The inscription has been translated as follows:

This is the tomb and two funeral monuments above it, which Abdobodat the governor made for Itaybel the governor, his father, and for Itaybel the camp commandant who is in Luhitu and Abarta, son of this Abdobodat the governor; in the territory of their rule, which they exercised twice for thirty-six years during the time of Aretas, king of the Nabataeans, lover of his people. And the above work was executed in the forty-sixth year.

The inscriptions consists of 8 lines, in a rectangular cartouche. The stone is basalt and measures approximately 60 cm x 46 cm x 30 cm. Clermont-Ganneau noted that both inscriptions are written on a concave surface.

== Date ==
The inscription refers to the 46th year of the reign of King Aretas IV Philopatris, which corresponds to the year 37 CE. This is approximately the same year as the Conversion of Paul the Apostle on the "road to Damascus"; according to the New Testament 2 Cor 11: 32–33, Aretas was the governor of Damascus at the time.
