= Puteoli Nabataean inscriptions =

The Puteoli Nabataean inscriptions are Nabataean inscriptions discovered at Puteoli (modern Pozzuoli, Italy), a Roman port in the Bay of Naples. They provide evidence for a community of Nabataean merchants active in Italy during the early Roman Empire and for the worship of the Nabataean god Dushara outside Arabia Petraea. The inscriptions are dated to the early 1st century CE, during the reign of the Nabataean king Aretas IV Philopatris.

The first known inscription was published in 1851 by the antiquarian Giuseppe Maria Fusco, who had acquired the stones among several inscriptions found in the port area. Ernest Renan examined the stone in the National Archaeological Museum of Naples, together with a second stone, and obtained plaster casts with the assistance of the archaeologist Giuseppe Fiorelli. Subsequent publications were made by Johann Gildemeister and Joseph Halévy.

They are carved from Italian marble, and are held in the National Archaeological Museum of Naples.

They are thought to have stood near a temple used by Nabataean traders living or operating in Puteoli, which was discovered underwater in 2023.

== CIS II 157 ==
CIS II 157 is relatively complete. It is a dedication to Dushara and mentions two Nabataean merchants who offered votive gifts in the twentieth year of Aretas IV Philopatris, equating to 11 CE.:

אלה תרי גמליא די קרבו זידו ועבדאלגא בני תימו בר הנאו לדושרא די ענה להון בשנת 20 לחרתת מלכא מלך נבטו רחם עמה

These are the two camels which Zaidu and Abdelge, sons of Thaimu son of Hani'u, offered to the god Dušara who answered them, in the twentieth year of Haretat (Aretas), king of the Nabataeans, who loves his people.

== CIS II 158 ==
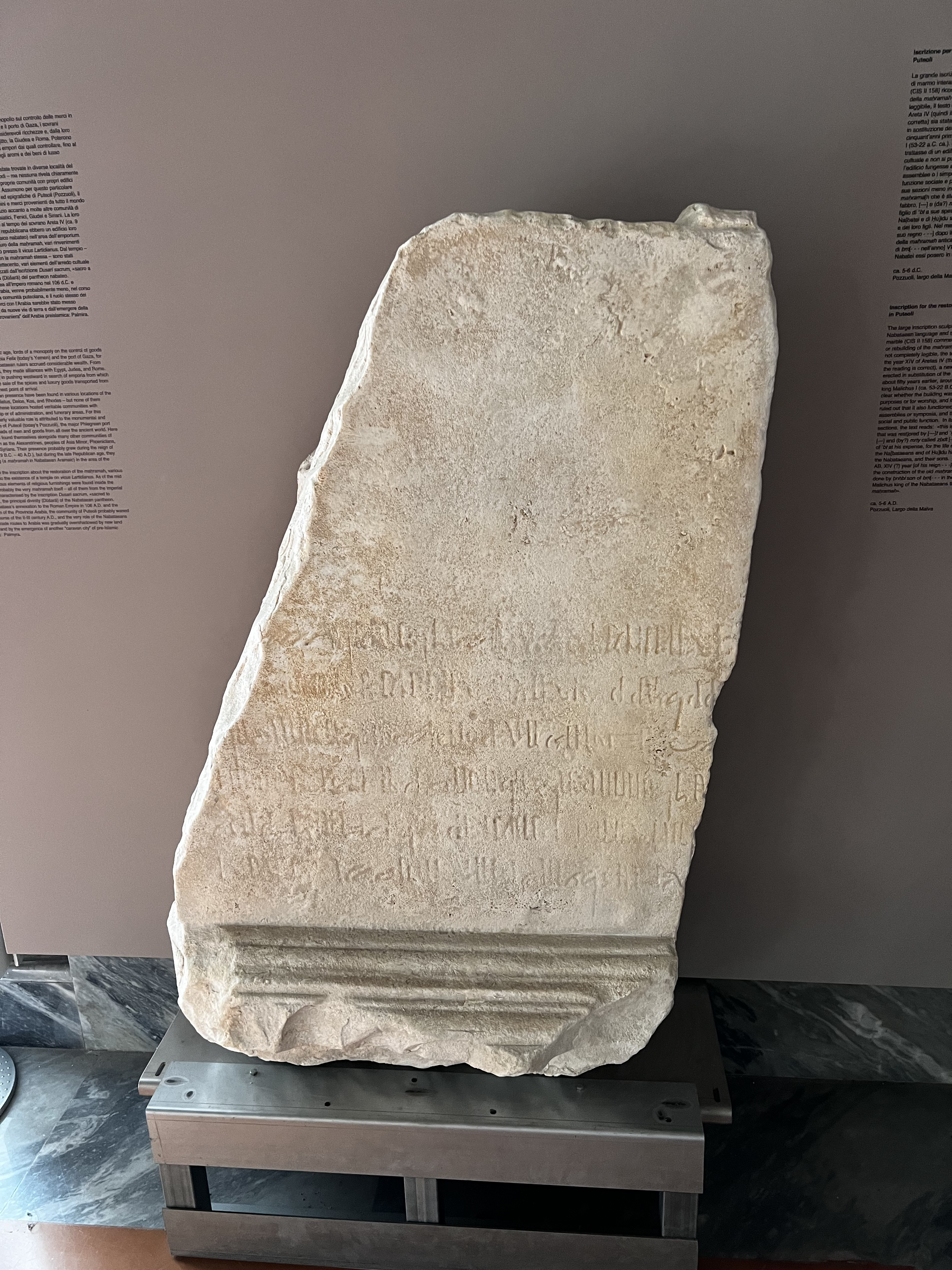
CIS II 158 in the Naples Archaeological Museum

CIS II 158 is damaged, with several missing lines. It records the renovation of a sanctuary in 5–6 CE, and invokes the welfare of the king, his queen Huldu, and their sons. The text also refers to an earlier sanctuary built during the reign of the Nabataean king Malichus I, indicating that Nabataean religious activity at Puteoli may have continued for several decades:

This is the mahramah that was restored by [—]t and by the blacksmith, [—] and (by?) mrty called zbdt [—] (?) sydw son of ‘bt at his expense, for the life of Aretas king of the Nabataeans and of Huldu his wife queen of the Nabataeans, and their sons. In the month of AB, XIV (?) year [of his reign —] after the time of the construction of the old mahramah, which was done by brhbl son of bnt— in the year VIII (?) of Malichus king of the Nabataeans they laid in this mahramah.

== Latin altars ==
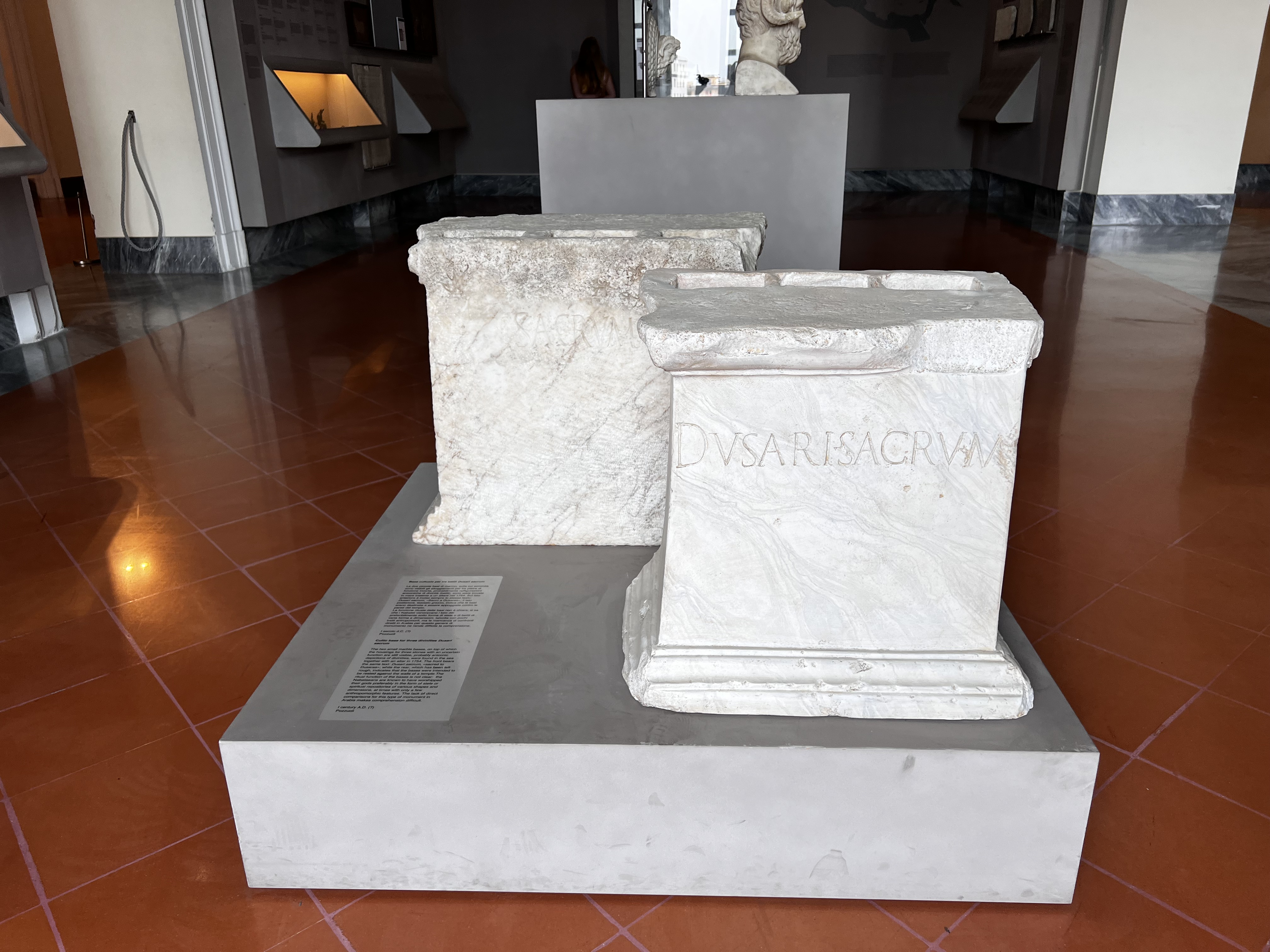
Latin altars to Dusari sacrum at the Naples Archaeological Museum

Latin altars from the temple have been found with the Latin inscription CIL X 1, 1556: Dusari sacrum. The first known was found in the sea in 1754, and published by Theodor Mommsen in his Inscriptiones Regni Neapolitani Latinae as no.2462. Recent further excavations in 2023 found additional similar inscriptions.
