= Louis Jalabert =

French archaeologist

Reverent father Louis Jalabert (30 March 1877, Lyon – 12 August 1943, Nice) was a French archaeologist and epigrapher.

== Biography ==
A novice of the Society of Jesus (1895), he took a BA in 1899 and went to teach in Beirut. He was thus a professor at the Collège Saint Joseph (1901–1907) then at the Faculté orientale of Beirut (1911–1914).

On his return to France in 1914, he became the editor of the magazine Études. In 1923 he was elected a member of the Académie des sciences d'outre-mer from its foundation

In 1935, his work Syrie et Liban was awarded the "Prix Bordin" of the Académie française

In 1936, he was made a recipient of the Legion of Honour.

== Some works ==
- 1906: Inscriptions grecques et latines de la Syrie, Mélanges de la Faculté orientale I, Beyrouth.
- Inscriptions grecques et latines de Syrie, Syria n°1, (p. 132–188)
- 1921: Le film corrupteur.
- 1922: Dictionnaire apologétique de la foi catholique, with father René Mouterde.
- 1929 and 1939: Recueil des inscriptions grecques et latines de Syrie, with father R. Mouterde.
- 1934: Syrie et Liban. Réussite française ?

== Bibliography ==
- Charles E. O'Neill, Joaquín María Domínguez, Diccionario histórico de la Compañía de Jesús, 2001, p. 2122 (Read online)
- Eve Gran-Aymerich, Les chercheurs de passé, Éditions du CNRS, 2007, (p. 891–892)
- Claude Brunet, Des formes et des mots chez les Anciens, 2008, (p. 281)
