= Chaabou =

Ancient Nabatean goddess

According to the early Christian bishop Epiphanius of Salamis (c. 315–403), Chaabou or Kaabu (Nabataean Arabic: 𐢏𐢁𐢃𐢈, romanized: KʾBW; Ancient Greek: Χααβου) was a goddess in the Nabataean pantheon—a virgin who gave birth to the god Dusares. However, a few modern scholars claim without proof that Epiphanius may have mistaken the word kaʿbu ("cube", etymologically identical to the name of the Kaaba), referring to the stone blocks used by the Nabateans to represent Dusares and possibly other deities, for the proper name of a goddess. His report that Chaabou was a virgin was likely influenced by his desire to find a parallel to the Christian belief in the virgin birth of Jesus, and by the similarity of the words kaʿbah and kaʿibah ("virgin") in Arabic, the native tongue of the Nabataeans.

== See also ==
- al-Lat
- Kaaba
