= Imtan =

Village in southern Syria

Imtan امتان
- Village
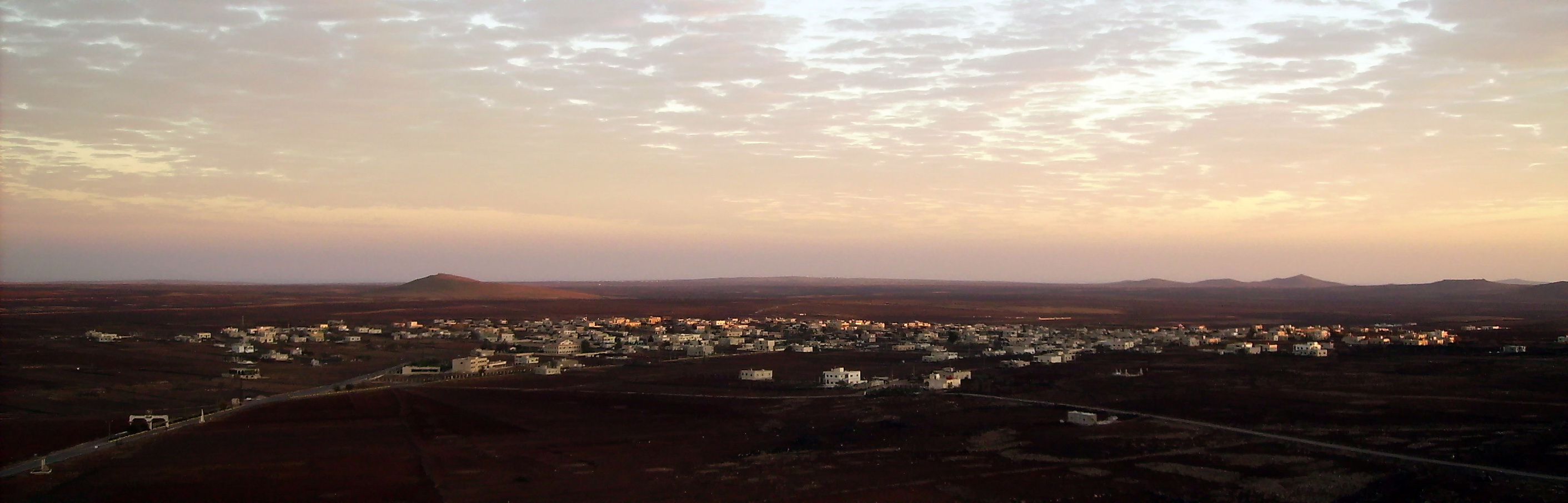

- Location in Syria
- Coordinates: 32°25′N 36°49′E
- Grid position: 320/203
- Country: Syria
- Governorate: Suwayda
- District: Salkhad
- Subdistrict: Salkhad
- Elevation: 1,189 m (3,901 ft)

Population (2004 census)
  - Total: 2,495
- Time zone: UTC+2 (EET)
  - Summer (DST): UTC+3 (EEST)

Imtan (Arabic: امتان) is a village in Suwayda Governorate, southern Syria. Imtan is located 37 km south-east of the city of Suwayda, 1189 meters above sea level in the southern part of Jabal al-Druze. According to the Syria Central Bureau of Statistics (CBS), Imtan had a population of 2,495 in the 2004 census. Its inhabitants are predominantly Druze, with a Christian minority.

== History ==
It is believed that the village has been inhabited since 6000 BCE, although there is little evidence supporting this. Imtan has many archeological sites spanning many eras. The village played a major role in the Great Syrian Revolution against France in 1925.

In 1596 Imtan appeared in the Ottoman tax registers as al-Mubattan and was part of the nahiya of Bani Malik as-Sadir in the Sanjak of Hauran. It had an all Muslim population consisting of 7 households and 2 bachelors. The villagers paid a fixed tax-rate of 20% on agricultural products, including on wheat, barley, summer crops, goats and/or beehives; a total of 3,400 akçe.

== Demographics ==
The village is mainly inhabited by Druze. The inhabitants are predominantly poor. The inhabitants are well educated and the village is home to over 300 university graduates, amongst them are 80 engineers and 68 doctors.

The inhabitants look to collaborative work as a way to compensate for the absence of government services. They collaborated to build a school, medical center, and cooperative retail store. They have also established a farmer's union and community fund which offers help to the poorest families.

== Religious buildings ==
- Maqam al-Khidr (Druze Shrine)

== See also ==
- Druze in Syria

== Bibliography ==
- Hütteroth, W.-D.; Abdulfattah, K. (1977). Historical Geography of Palestine, Transjordan and Southern Syria in the Late 16th Century. Erlanger Geographische Arbeiten, Sonderband 5. Erlangen, Germany: Vorstand der Fränkischen Geographischen Gesellschaft. ISBN 3-920405-41-2.
