= Annie Sartre-Fauriat =

French historian and epigrapher

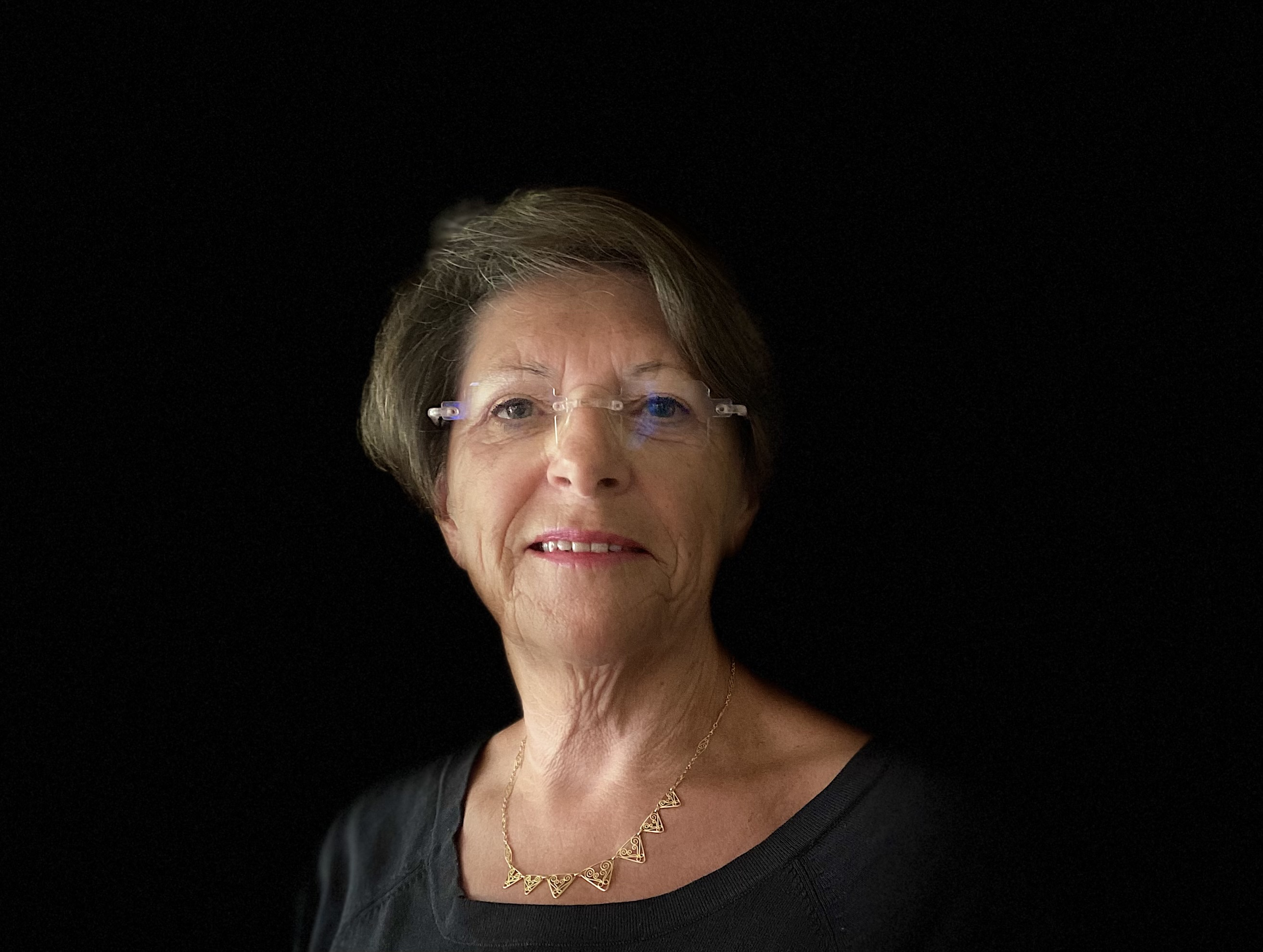
- Born: Annie Fauriat; November 17, 1947
- Occupations: Historian, professor, hellenist, epigraphist
- Spouse: Maurice Sartre
- Awards: Prix Pierre-Lafue (2016) Chevalier des Arts et des Lettres (2016)

Academic background
- Education: Paris 1 Panthéon-Sorbonne University

Academic work
- Institutions: University of Artois (2002-2011) Blaise Pascal University (1997-2002) French National Centre for Scientific Research
- Notable works: Zénobie de Palmyre à Rome, Perrin, Paris, 2014. Palmyre vérités et légendes, Perrin, Paris, 2016. Aventuriers, voyageurs et savants à la découverte archéologique de la Syrie (17th-21st century), CNRS édit., Paris, 2021.

Annie Sartre-Fauriat, born Annie Fauriat on 17 November 1947, is a French historian specialising in funerary archaeology and Greek and Latin epigraphy of the Greco-Roman Near East, as well as travel and travellers in the East in both the 19th and 20th centuries.

== Biography ==
Annie Sartre-Fauriat has a degree in history and a doctorate from the Panthéon-Sorbonne University. University Professor since 1992. She is Professor Emeritus of the University of Artois.

She is a member of the UNESCO expert group on Syrian heritage.

== Publications ==
A list of some of Sartre-Fauriat's publications:

- The Road to Palmyra, Chapter 4: The discovery and reception of Palmyra, Ny Carlsberg Glypotek, Copenhagen, Denmark, 2019. ISBN 9788774523635
- Palmyre: La Cité Des Caravanes, Gallimard, Paris, 2008. ISBN 9782070346592
- Zénobie de Palmyre à Rome, Perrin, Paris, 2014. ISBN 9782262040970
- Palmyre vérités et légendes, Perrin, Paris, 2016. ISBN 9782262066154
- Aventuriers, voyageurs et savants à la découverte archéologique de la Syrie (17th-21st century), CNRS édit., Paris, 2021. ISBN 9782271137081

== Distinctions ==
=== Decoration ===
- Chevalier de l'ordre des Arts et des Lettres

=== Awards ===
- 2015 - Prix Historia de la biographie historique
- 2016 - 40e Prix Pierre-Lafue.
- 2021 - Prix Plottel de l’Académie des Inscriptions et Belles Lettres - intended to encourage high-level work in the field of classical studies, awarded to crown the series of Greek and Latin Inscriptions of Syria published by the Institut français du Proche-Orient.
