= Dushara =

Deity in the Nabataean pantheon

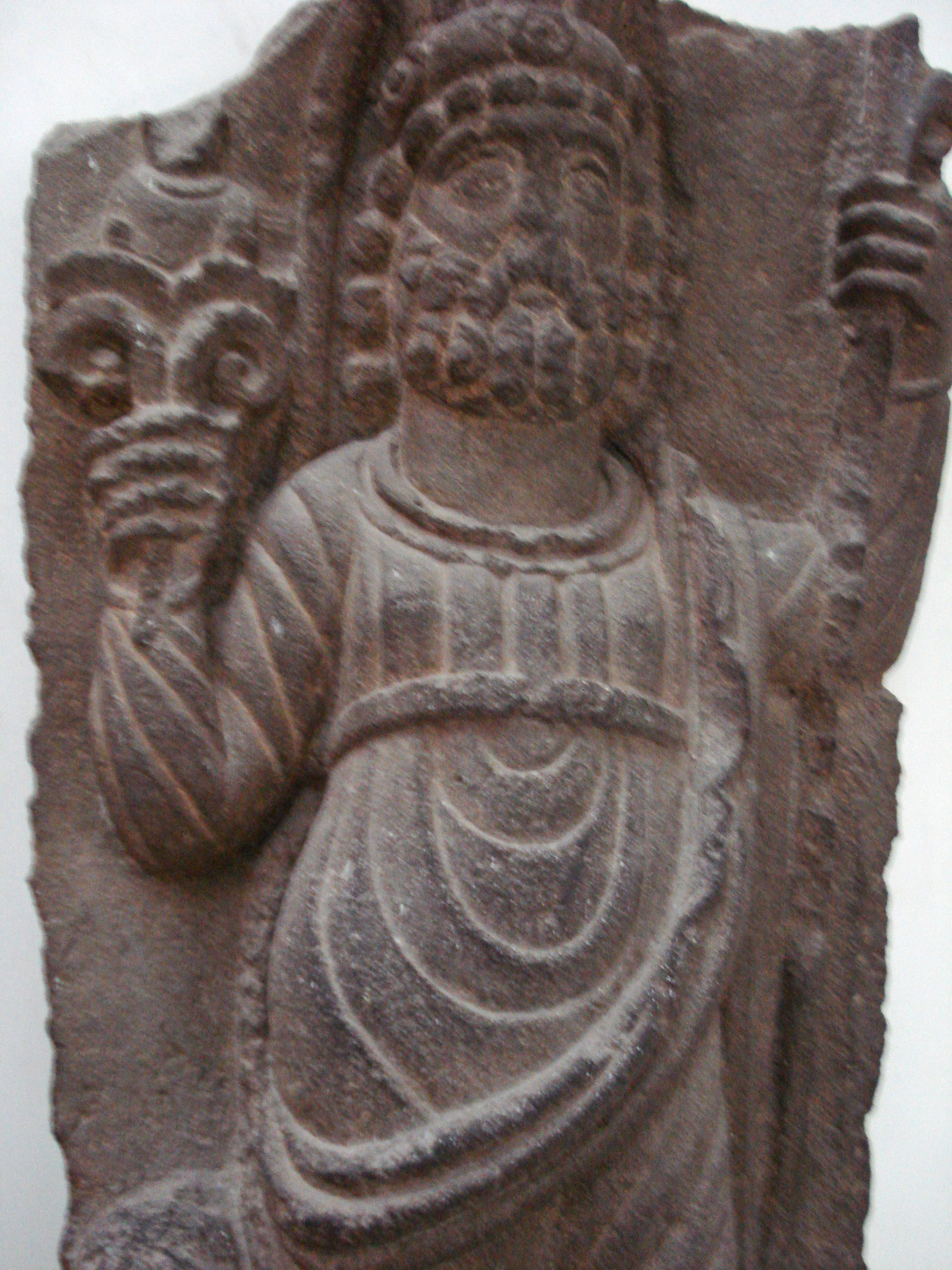
Dushara

Dushara (Nabataean Arabic: 𐢅𐢈𐢝𐢛𐢀, romanized: dwšrʾ; Safaitic: 𐪕𐪆𐪇, romanized: dśr), also transliterated as Dusares or Dhu Shara, is a pre-Islamic Arabian god worshipped by the Nabataeans at Petra and Hegra (of which city he was the patron). Safaitic inscriptions imply he was the son of the goddess Al-Lat, and that he assembled in the heavens with other deities. He is called "Dushara from Petra" in one inscription. Dushara was expected to bring justice if called by the correct ritual.

== Etymology ==
Dushara is known first from epigraphic Nabataean sources who invariably spell the name dwšrʾ, the Nabataean script denoting only consonants. He appears in Classical Greek sources as Δουσάρης (Dousárēs) and in Latin as Dusares. The original meaning is disputed, but early Muslim historian Hisham ibn al-Kalbi in his "Book of Idols" explains the name as Ḏū l-Šarā (Arabic: ذو الشرى), "etymologically probably 'the one of the Shara (mountains north of Petra)'", referring to a mountain range southeast of the Dead Sea now known as al-Sharat. This interpretation is accepted by some scholars, and compared to other Canaaite deities who are associated with mountains or geographic areas (such as Baal Lebanon, Baal Hermon, and YHWH Teman and YHWH Shomron from Kuntillet Ajrud inscriptions). If this interpretation is correct, Dushara would be more of a title than a proper name, but both the exact form of the name and its interpretation are disputed.

== Worship ==
In Classical Greek times, he was associated with Zeus because he was the chief of the Nabataean pantheon as well as with Dionysus.

A shrine to Dushara has been discovered in the harbour of ancient Puteoli in Italy, together with the Puteoli Nabataean inscriptions. The city was an important nexus for trade to the Near East and it is known to have had a Nabataean presence during the mid first century BCE. The cult continued in some capacity well into the Roman period and possibly as late as the Islamic period.

This deity was mentioned by the ninth century CE Muslim historian Hisham Ibn Al-Kalbi, who wrote in the Book of Idols (Kitab al-Asnām) that: "The Banū al-Hārith ibn-Yashkur ibn-Mubashshir of the ʻAzd had an idol called Dū Sharā".

Safaitic inscriptions mention animal sacrifices to Dushara, asking for a variety of services.

== See also ==
- Chaabou
- Shara (god)
- Orotalt

== Bibliography ==
- Ibn al-Kalbī, The Book of Idols, Being a Translation from the Arabic of the Kitāb al-Asnām. Tr. and comm. Nabih Amin Faris (Princeton, Princeton University Press, 1952).
- Healey, John F., The Religion of the Nabataeans: A Conspectus (Leiden, Brill, 2001) (Religions in the Graeco-Roman World, 136).
- el-Khouri, Lamia; Johnson, David, "A New Nabataean Inscription from Wadi Mataha, Petra", Palestine Exploration Quarterly, 137,2 (2005), 169–174.
