= Writing systems of pre-Islamic Arabia =

The writing systems of pre-Islamic Arabia comprise a diverse group of scripts used across the Arabian Peninsula and adjacent regions prior to the rise of Islam in the 7th century AD. These scripts reflect the position of Arabia as a crossroads between the Mediterranean, Mesopotamian, Iranian, and African cultural spheres, and they were employed for a range of functions including monumental inscriptions, religious dedications, administrative records, graffiti, and personal names. Most of the known writing systems belong to the South Semitic branch of the Semitic script family, though others derive from Aramaic and Greek models.

The study of these writing systems relies primarily on epigraphy, as literary manuscripts from pre-Islamic Arabia have not survived. Inscriptions are attested from at least the early 1st millennium BC until the early Islamic period, with significant regional variation in script, language, and orthographic practices.

== Overview ==
Pre-Islamic Arabia did not possess a single unified writing system, although Paleo-Arabic, the predecessor of the current Arabic script, begins to be found across the Peninsula in Late Antiquity (fourth to sixth centuries) alongside regional scripts.

Instead, multiple scripts coexisted, often associated with specific regions, polities, or cultural traditions. Broadly, these scripts can be divided into:

- Ancient South Arabian scripts, used mainly in southern Arabia (modern Yemen and parts of Oman and Saudi Arabia)
- Ancient North Arabian scripts, used across northern and central Arabia and the Levantine fringe
- Aramaic-derived scripts, including Nabataean, which ultimately gave rise to the Arabic script
- Foreign or auxiliary scripts, such as Greek and Ethiopic (Geʽez), used in limited contexts

== Linguistic family ==
According to the classification presented by Huehnergard and Pat-El, the relevant branches are:

- Afroasiatic
  - Berber
  - Egyptian
  - Semitic
    - East Semitic
    - West Semitic
      - Ethio-Semitic
      - Modern South Arabian
      - Central Semitic
        - Northwest Semitic
          - Canaanite
          - Aramaic
        - South Semitic
          - Ancient South Arabian
          - Ancient North Arabian

== Scripts ==
=== Ancient South Arabian scripts ===
The Ancient South Arabian (ASA) scripts form a closely related group of consonantal alphabets (abjads) used primarily in the kingdoms of South Arabia from approximately the 9th century BC to the 6th century AD. They are written from right to left, though boustrophedon is occasionally attested early on. The scripts consist of 29 distinct (consonantal) letters. ASA was used to write many important languages in the history of South Arabia, including Sabaic, Minaic, Qatabanic, and Hadramautic.

=== Ancient North Arabian scripts ===
Ancient North Arabian (ANA) refers to a group of alphabetic scripts used in northern and central Arabia between roughly the 8th century BC and the 4th century AD. Unlike the South Arabian scripts, ANA scripts are more diverse and more often used for graffiti instead of formal monumental inscriptions. The major forms include Safaitic, Hismaic, Dadanitic, Thamudic (an umbrella term for many unrelated, ungrouped, and poorly understood scripts).

==== Safaitic ====
Safaitic is one of the best-attested ANA scripts, with tens of thousands of graffiti found in the basalt deserts of southern Syria, northeastern Jordan, and northern Saudi Arabia. The inscriptions were typically incised by pastoral nomads and record personal names, genealogies, prayers, curses, and accounts of daily life.

==== Dadanitic ====
Dadanitic was used in the oasis of Dadan (modern al-Ula) in northwestern Arabia. It appears in formal inscriptions associated with local kingship, religious dedications, and public works. The script is more standardized than most ANA varieties and reflects a more centralized scribal tradition.

==== Dumaitic ====
Dumaitic was primarily used in the oasis and ancient city of Dūmat al-Jandal in the al-Jawf Province of northern Saudi Arabia. Only three inscriptions were known from this script until more recently, when another sixteen were discovered.

==== Thamudic ====
The label Thamudic was historically applied to a wide range of ANA inscriptions that did not fit neatly into other categories. Modern scholarship recognizes that "Thamudic" is a tenuous collection of distinct scripts, often designated Thamudic A (now known as Taymanitic), B, C, D, E (now known as Hismaic) and Thamudic F. Recently, progress has been made towards the dechiperment of Thamudic D.

==== Taymanitic ====
Taymanitic was a script used in the ancient oasis of Tayma.

==== Hismaic ====
Hismaic inscriptions are concentrated in southern Jordan and northwestern Arabia, particularly in the Ḥismā desert. The script is closely related to Safaitic but shows distinct letter forms and conventions. Like Safaitic, Hismaic inscriptions are usually brief and informal.

==== Himaitic ====
Himaitic (also called Thamudic F or Southern Thamudic) was a script primarily attested from the Hima region, north of Najran. Tens of thousands of inscriptions from this script have been discovered, mainly personal names.

=== Aramaic-derived scripts ===
==== Nabataean ====
The Nabataean script developed from Imperial Aramaic and was used by the Nabataean Kingdom, whose territory included southern Jordan, the Negev, and northwestern Arabia. Nabataean inscriptions date from the 2nd century BC to the 4th century AD.

==== The evolution of Arabic from Nabataean ====
The Arabic script evolved from the Nabataean script through a series of transitions.

Broadly, it is believed that the Nabataean script gave rise to Nabataean Aramaic, which transitioned into Nabataean Arabic, into Paleo-Arabic (in the 5th and 6th centuries AD), and finally, the Arabic script as it is found in the early Islamic era.

- Nabataean Aramaic: In the 2nd or 1st centuries BCE, the first known records of the Nabataean alphabet were written in the Aramaic language (which was the language of communication and trade), but included some Arabic language features: the Nabataeans did not write the language which they spoke. They wrote in a form of the Aramaic alphabet, which continued to evolve; it separated into two forms: one intended for inscriptions (known as "monumental Nabataean") and the other, more cursive and hurriedly written and with joined letters, for writing on papyrus. This cursive form influenced the monumental form more and more and gradually changed into the Arabic alphabet.
- Nabataeo-Arabic: Starting in the third century, and until the mid-fifth century, the Nabataean Aramaic alphabet evolved into what is known as Nabataeo-Arabic. This alphabet has received this name because it contains a mixture of features from the prior Aramaic script, in addition to a number of notable features from the later fully developed Arabic script.
- Paleo-Arabic: A pre-Islamic phase of the Arabic alphabet, roughly having reached the standardized form of Arabic from the Islamic era, but having already been expressed from the late fifth to the sixth century.

=== Dhofari ===
The Dhofari script is a South Semitic writing system is a group of related South Semitic scripts used across southern and southeastern Arabia, from Dhofar in Oman to Al Mahrah in Yemen and as far as Socotra. In 2025, it was deciphered by Ahmad Al-Jallad.

== Other scripts used in Arabia ==
=== Greek ===
Greek inscriptions are attested in parts of northwestern Arabia, particularly in areas under Hellenistic and Roman influence. Greek was used mainly for official, dedicatory, or administrative purposes rather than for local vernacular expression.

=== Ethiopic (Geʽez) ===
The Ethiopic (Geʽez) script appears in southern Arabia during periods of Aksumite presence, especially in the 6th century. It was used primarily for royal and religious inscriptions connected with the Kingdom of Aksum.

== See also ==
- Pre-Islamic Arabia
- Epigraphy
- Semitic alphabets
- History of the Arabic alphabet
