= History of the Arabic alphabet =

The Arabic alphabet is thought to be traced back to a Nabataean variation of the Aramaic alphabet, known as Nabataean Aramaic. This script itself descends from the Phoenician alphabet, an ancestral alphabet that additionally gave rise to the Armenian, Cyrillic, Devanagari, Greek, Hebrew and Latin alphabets. Nabataean Aramaic evolved into Nabataean Arabic, so-called because it represents a transitional phase between the known recognizably Aramaic and Arabic scripts. Nabataean Arabic was succeeded by Paleo-Arabic, termed as such because it dates to the pre-Islamic period in the fifth and sixth centuries CE, but is also recognizable in light of the Arabic script as expressed during the Islamic era. Finally, the standardization of the Arabic alphabet during the Islamic era led to the emergence of classical Arabic. The phase of the Arabic alphabet today is known as Modern Standard Arabic, although classical Arabic survives as a "high" variety as part of a diglossia.

There were different theories about the origin of the Arabic alphabet as attested in Arabic writings, The Musnad theory is that it can be traced back to Ancient North Arabian scripts which are derived from ancient South Arabian script (Arabic: خَطّ الْمُسْنَد ḵaṭṭ al-musnad), this hypothesis have been discussed by the Arabic scholars Ibn Jinni and Ibn Khaldun. Ahmed Sharaf Al-Din has argued that the relationship between the Arabic alphabet and the Nabataeans is only due to the influence of the latter after its emergence (from Ancient South Arabian script). Arabic has a one-to-one correspondence with ancient South Arabian script except for the letter 𐩯 (reconstructed Proto-Semitic s³).

Arabic and ancient South Arabian letters
Script	Letters														
Musnad	_{𐩱}	_{𐩨}	_{𐩩}	_{𐩻}	_{𐩴}	_{𐩢}	_{𐩭}	_{𐩵}	_{𐩹}	_{𐩧}	_{𐩸}	_{𐩯}	_{𐩪}	_{𐩦}	_{𐩮}
Arabic	ﺍ	ب	ت	ث	ج	ح	خ	د	ذ	ر	ز	–	س	ش	ص
Musnad	_{𐩳}	_{𐩷}	_{𐩼}	_{𐩲}	_{𐩶}	_{𐩰}	_{𐩤}	_{𐩫}	_{𐩡}	_{𐩣}	_{𐩬}	_{𐩠}	_{𐩥}	_{𐩺}	
Arabic	ض	ط	ظ	ع	غ	ف	ق	ك	ل	م	ن	ه	و	ي	

While the modern Nabatean theory is that the Arabic alphabet can be traced back to the Nabataean script. A transitional phase, between the Nabataean Aramaic script and a subsequent, recognizably Arabic script, is known as Nabataean Arabic. The pre-Islamic phase of the script as it existed in the fifth and sixth centuries, once it had become recognizably similar to the script as it came to be known in the Islamic era, is known as Paleo-Arabic.

== Pre-Islamic phases ==
The Arabic alphabet evolved either from the Nabataean, or (less widely believed) directly from the Syriac alphabet. The phases of the Arabic script, prior to the Islamic period, can be categorized as follows:

- Nabataean Aramaic: In the 2nd or 1st centuries BCE, the first known records of the Nabataean alphabet were written in the Aramaic language (which was the language of communication and trade), but included some Arabic language features: the Nabataeans did not write the language which they spoke. They wrote in a form of the Aramaic alphabet, which continued to evolve; it separated into two forms: one intended for inscriptions (known as "monumental Nabataean") and the other, more cursive and hurriedly written and with joined letters, for writing on papyrus. This cursive form influenced the monumental form more and more and gradually changed into the Arabic alphabet.
- Nabataeo-Arabic: Starting in the third century, and until the mid-fifth century, the Nabataean Aramaic alphabet evolved into what is known as Nabataeo-Arabic. This alphabet has received this name because it contains a mixture of features from the prior Aramaic script, in addition to a number of notable features from the later fully developed Arabic script.
- Paleo-Arabic: A pre-Islamic phase of the Arabic alphabet, roughly having reached the standardized form of Arabic from the Islamic era, but having already been expressed from the late fifth to the sixth century.

== Pre-Islamic Arabic inscriptions ==
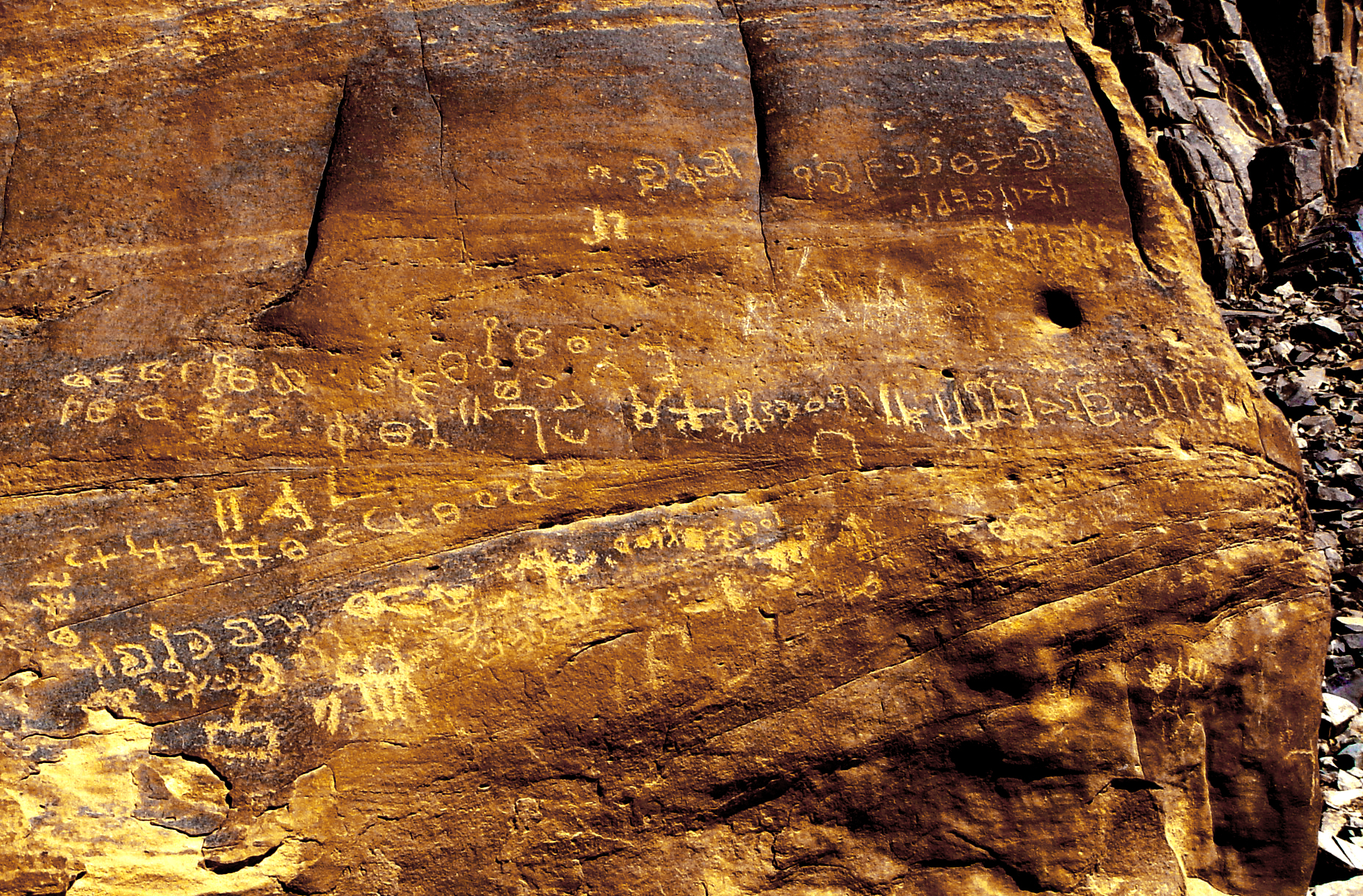
Petroglyphs in Wadi Rum (Jordan)

The first known recorded text in the Arabic alphabet is known as the Zabad inscription, composed in 512. It is a trilingual dedication in Greek, Syriac and Arabic found at the village of Zabad in northwestern Syria. The version of the Arabic alphabet used includes only 21 letters, of which only 15 are different, being used to note 28 phonemes:

Phoenician		Aramaic	Nabataean	Arabic	Syriac	Latin
Image	Text	Aramaic	Nabataean	Arabic	Syriac	Latin
Aleph	𐤀	𐡀		ﺍ	ܐ	A
Beth	𐤁	𐡁		ٮ	ܒ	B
Gimel	𐤂	𐡂		حـ	ܓ	C
Daleth	𐤃	𐡃		د	ܕ	D
He	𐤄	𐡄		ه	ܗ	E
Waw	𐤅	𐡅		ﻭ	ܘ	F
Zayin	𐤆	𐡆		ر	ܙ	Z
Heth	𐤇	𐡇		ح	ܚ	H
Teth	𐤈	𐡈		ط	ܛ	—
Yodh	𐤉	𐡉		ى	ܝ	I
Kaph	𐤊	𐡊		كـ	ܟ	K
Lamedh	𐤋	𐡋		لـ	ܠ	L
Mem	𐤌	𐡌		مـ	ܡ	M
Nun	𐤍	𐡍		ں	ܢ	N
Samekh	𐤎	𐡎		—	ܣ	—
Ayin	𐤏	𐡏		عـ	ܥ	O
Pe	𐤐	𐡐		ڡـ	ܦ	P
Sadek	𐤑	𐡑		ص	ܨ	—
Qoph	𐤒	𐡒		ٯ	ܩ	Q
Res	𐤓	𐡓		ﺭ	ܪ	R
Sin	𐤔	𐡔		سـ	ܫ	S
Taw	𐤕	𐡕		ٮ	ܬ	T

Many thousands of pre-Classical Arabic inscriptions are attested, mainly written in the following scripts:

- Safaitic (over 13,000; almost all graffiti)
- Hismaic in the southern parts of central Arabia
- Nabataean inscriptions in Aramaic, written in the Nabataean alphabet
- Pre-Islamic Arabic inscriptions in the Arabic alphabet are few. They mostly use no dots, making them sometimes difficult to interpret, as many letters are the same shape as other letters (they are written with rasm only)

Below are descriptions of inscriptions found in the Arabic alphabet, and the inscriptions found in the Nabataean alphabet that show the beginnings of Arabic-like features.

Name	Whereabouts	Date	Language	Alphabet	Text & notes
Al-Hasa	Nejd, Historical Bahrain region	4th century BC	3 lines in Hasean	Epigraphic South Arabian alphabets	A large funerary stone is inscribed in the Hasaean dialect using a variety of South Arabian monumental script, with three inscribed lines for the man Matmat, that records both patrilineal and matriarchal descent: 1. "Tombstone and grave of Matmat,"; 2. "son of Zurubbat, those of 'Ah-"; 3. "nas, her of the father of Sa'ad-"; 4. "ab.." (Dr. A. Jamme)
Qaryat al-Fāw	Wadi ad-Dawasir, Nejd	1st century BC	10 lines in Arabic	Epigraphic South Arabian alphabets	A tomb dedicatory and a prayer to Lāh, Kāhil and ʻAṯṯār to protect the tomb: "ʿIgl son of Hafʿam constructed for his brother Rabibil son of Hafʿam the tomb: both for him and for his child and his wife, and his children and their children's children and womenfolk, free members of the folk Ghalwan. And he has placed it under the protection of (the gods) Kahl and Lah and ʿAthtar al-Shariq from anyone strong or weak, and anyone who would attempt to sell or pledge it, for all time without any derogation, so long as the sky produces rain or the earth herbage." (Beeston)
Ein Avdat	Negev in Israel	between AD 88 and 150	3 lines Aramaic, then 3 lines Arabic	Nabataean with a little letter-joining	A prayer of thanks to the god Obodas for saving someone's life: "For (Obodas -the god-) works without reward or favour, and he, when death tried to claim us, did not let it claim (us), for when a wound (of ours) festered, he did not let us perish." (Bellamy) "فيفعﻞُﻻفِ ًداوﻻاثرافكاﻦ هُنايَبْ ِغنا الموﺖُﻻأبْ ُغاﻪ فكاﻦ هُنا أدادَ ُجرﺢٌﻻيرْ ِد"
Umm el-Jimal	northeast of Jordan	roughly end of 3rd century - 5th century	Aramaic-Nabataean, Greek, Latin	Nabataean, much letter-joining	More than 50 fragments discovered: 1. "Zabūd son of Māsik "; 2. "[.]aynū daughter of MuΉārib"; 3. "Kawza' peace!"; (Said and al-Hadad) "([Th]is is the tomb which SHYMW … built … (2) … [for P]N, hisson, through (the help of) the god of their father … (3) … king Rabel, king of the Nabataeans …" (Butts and Hardy) "This is the memorial of Julianos, weighed down by long sleep, for whom his father Agathos built it while shedding a tear beside the boundary of the communal cemetery of the people of Christ, in order that a better people might always sing of him openly, being formerly the beloved faithful [son?] of Agathos the presbyter, aged twelve. In the year 239 [of the era of the Provincia Arabia = 344 AD]." (Trombley) In the 5th century barracks were built. In their southeast tower, which stands to a height of six stories, the names of the archangels—"Michael, Uriel, Gabriel and Raphael"—are inscribed. (Micah Key)
Raqush (this is not a place-name)	Mada'in Saleh in Saudi Arabia	267	Mixture of Arabic and Aramaic, 1 vertical line in Thamudic	Nabataean, some letter-joining. Has a few diacritic dots.	Last inscription in Nabataean language. Epitaph to one Raqush, including curse against grave-violaters: "This is a grave K b. H has taken care of for his mother, Raqush bint ʿA. She died in al-Hijr in the year 162 in the month of Tammuz. May the Lord of the world curse anyone who desecrates this grave and opens it up, except his offspring! May he [also] curse anyone who buries [someone in the grave] and [then] removes [him] from it! May who buries.... be cursed!" (Healey and Smith)
an-Namāra	100 km SE of Damascus	328–329	Arabic	Nabataean, more letter-joining than previous	A long epitaph for the famous Arab poet and war-leader Imru'ul-Qays, describing his war deeds: "This is the funerary monument of Imru' al-Qays, son of 'Amr, king of the Arabs, and (?) his title of honour was Master of Asad and Madhhij. And he subdued the Asadis and they were overwhelmed together with their kings, and he put to flight Madhhij thereafter, and came driving them to the gates of Najran, the city of Shammar, and he subdued Ma'add, and he dealt gently with the nobles of the tribes, and appointed them viceroys, and they became phylarchs for the Romans. And no king has equalled his achievements. Thereafter he died in the year 223 on the 7th day of Kaslul. Oh the good fortune of those who were his friends!" (Bellamy)
Jabal Ramm	50 km east of Aqaba, Jordan	3rd or likelier late 4th century	3 lines in Arabic, 1 bent line in Thamudic	Arabic. Has some diacritic dots.	In a temple of Allat. Boast or thanks of an energetic man who made his fortune: "I rose and made all sorts of money, which no world-weary man has [ever] collected. I have collected gold and silver; I announce it to those who are fed up and unwilling." (Bellamy)
Sakakah	in Saudi Arabia	undated	Arabic	Arabic, some Nabataean features, & dots	Includes diacritical points associated with Arabic letters ب, ت, and ن [T, B and N]. (Winnett and Reed)
Sakakah	in Saudi Arabia	3rd or 4th century	Arabic	Arabic	"Hama son of Garm"
Sakakah	in Saudi Arabia	4th century	Arabic	Arabic	"B-`-s-w son of `Abd-Imru'-al-Qais son of Mal(i)k"
Umm al-Jimāl	northeast of Jordan	4th or 5th century	Arabic	similar to Arabic	"This [inscription] was set up by colleagues of ʿUlayh son of ʿUbaydah, secretary of the cohort Augusta Secunda Philadelphiana; may he go mad who effaces it." (Bellamy)
Zabad	in Syria, south of Aleppo	512	Arabic, Greek and Syriac	Arabic	Christian dedicatory. The Arabic says "God's help" & 6 names. "God" is written as الاله, see Allah#Typography: "With the help of God! Sergius, son of Amat Manaf, and Tobi, son of Imru'l-qais and Sergius, son of Sa‘d, and Sitr, and Shouraih." (C. Rabin)
Jabal Usays	in Syria	528	Arabic	Arabic	Record of a military expedition by Ibrahim ibn Mughirah on behalf of the king al-Harith, presumably Al-Harith ibn Jabalah (Arethas in Greek), king of the Ghassanid vassals of the Byzantines: "This is Ruqaym, son of Mughayr the Awsite. Al-Ḥārith the king, sent me to 'Usays, upon his military posts in the year 423 [528 CE]"
Harrān	in Leija district, south of Damascus	568	Arabic, Greek	Arabic	Christian dedicatory, in a martyrium. It records Sharahil ibn Zalim building the martyrium a year after the destruction of Khaybar: "[I] Sharaḥīl, son of Talimu built this martyrium in the year 463 after the destruction of Khaybar by a year."

== Early Islamic changes ==
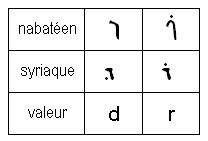
Table comparing Nabataean and Syriac forms of /d/ and /r/

The Arabic alphabet is first attested in its classical form in the 7th century. See PERF 558 for the first surviving Islamic Arabic writing.

The Quran was transcribed in Kufic script at first, which was then developed along with the Meccan and Medini scripts, according to Ibn an-Nadim in Al-Fihrist.

In the 7th century, probably in the early years of Islam while writing down the Qur'an, scribes realized that working out which of the ambiguous letters a particular letter was from context was laborious and not always possible, so a proper remedy was required. Writings in the Nabataean and Syriac alphabets already had sporadic examples of dots being used to distinguish letters which had become identical, for example as in the table on the right. By analogy with this, a system of dots was added to the Arabic alphabet to make enough different letters for Classical Arabic's 28 phonemes. Sometimes the resulting new letters were put in alphabetical order after their un-dotted originals, and sometimes at the end.

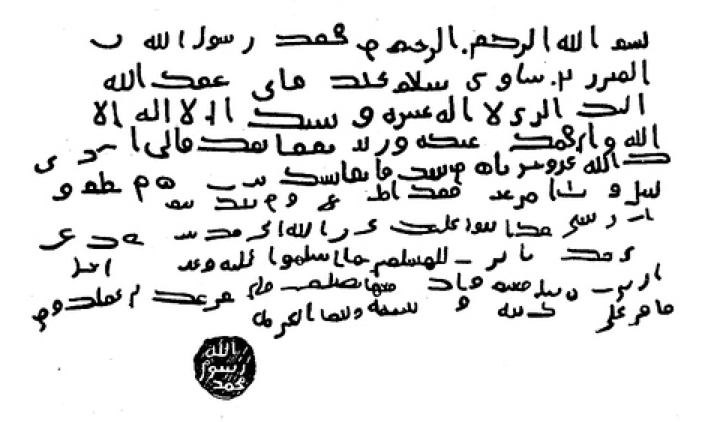
Facsimile of a letter claimed to be sent by Muhammad to Al-Mundhir ibn Sawa in Hijazi script.

The first surviving document that definitely uses these dots is also the first surviving Arabic papyrus (PERF 558), dated April, 643. The dots did not become obligatory until much later. Important texts like the Qur'an were frequently memorized; this practice, which survives even today, probably arose partly to avoid the great ambiguity of the script, and partly due to the scarcity of books in times when printing was unheard-of in the area and every copy of every book had to be written by hand.

The alphabet then had 28 letters, and so could be used to write the numbers 1 to 10, then 20 to 100, then 200 to 900, then 1000 (see Abjad numerals). In this numerical order, the new letters were put at the end of the alphabet. This produced this order: alif (1), b (2), j (3), d (4), h (5), w (6), z (7), H (8), T (9), y (10), k (20), l (30), m (40), n (50), s (60), ayn (70), f (80), S (90), q (100), r (200), sh (300), t (400), th (500), dh (600), kh (700), D (800), Z (900), gh (1000).

The lack of vowel signs in Arabic writing created more ambiguities: for example, in Classical Arabic ktb could be kataba = "he wrote", kutiba = "it was written" or kutub="books". Later, vowel signs and hamzas were added, beginning some time in the last half of the 6th century, at about the same time as the first invention of Syriac and Hebrew vocalization. Initially, this was done using a system of red dots, said to have been commissioned by Hajjaj ibn Yusuf, the Umayyad governor of Iraq, according to traditional accounts: a dot above = a, a dot below = i, a dot on the line = u, and doubled dots giving tanwin. However, this was cumbersome and easily confusable with the letter-distinguishing dots, so about 100 years later, the modern system was adopted. The system was finalized around 786 by al-Farahidi.

All administrative texts were previously recorded by Persian scribes in Middle Persian using Pahlavi script, The first to make spelling corrections were Abu al-Aswad al-Du'ali and al-Farahidi.

When new signs were added to the Arabic alphabet, they took the alphabetical order value of the letter which they were an alternative for: tā' marbūta (see also below) took the value of ordinary t, and not of h. In the same way, the many diacritics do not have any value: for example, a doubled consonant indicated by shadda does not count as a letter separate from the single one.

=== Letters Standardization ===
The Nabataean alphabet was designed to write 22 phonemes, but Arabic has 28 consonant phonemes; thus, when used to write the Arabic language, 6 of its letters must each represent two phonemes:

- t ⟨ت⟩ also represented ṯ ⟨ث⟩.
- ħ ⟨ح⟩ also represented ḵ ⟨خ⟩,
- d ⟨د⟩ also represented ḏ ⟨ذ⟩,
- ṣ ⟨ص⟩ also represented ḍ ⟨ض⟩,
- ṭ ⟨ط⟩ also represented ẓ ⟨ظ⟩,
- ʕ ⟨ع⟩ also represented ḡ ⟨غ⟩,

And even though the four letter pairs (b and t), (ħ and j), (r and z), (s and š) had different shapes in the Nabatean alphabet, they have similar shapes in Arabic:

- b ⟨ب⟩ and t ⟨ت⟩ have the same shape, in addition to the aforementioned ṯ ⟨ث⟩.
- ħ ⟨ح⟩ and j ⟨ج⟩ have the same shape, in addition to the aforementioned ḵ ⟨خ⟩.
- r ⟨ر⟩ and z ⟨ز⟩ have the same shape.
- s ⟨س⟩ and š ⟨ش⟩ have the same shape.

As cursive Nabataean writing evolved into Arabic writing, the writing became largely joined-up. Some of the letters became the same shape as other letters, producing more ambiguities, as in the table:

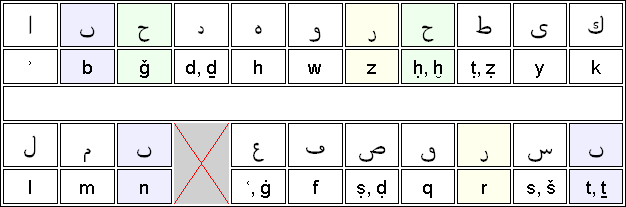

Here the Arabic letters are listed in the traditional Levantine order but are written in their current forms, for simplicity. The letters which are the same shape have coloured backgrounds. The second value of the letters that represent more than one phoneme is after a comma. In these tables, ǧ is j as in English "June". In the Arabic language, the g sound seems to have changed into j in fairly late pre-Islamic times, but this seems not to have happened in those tribes who invaded Egypt and settled there.

When a letter was at the end of a word, it often developed an end loop, and as a result most Arabic letters have two or more shapes, so for example y ⟨ي⟩ and n ⟨ن⟩ have different shapes at the end of the words (⟨ـي⟩, ⟨ـن⟩) but they have the same linked initial and medial shapes (⟨يـ⟩, ⟨نـ⟩) as b, t, and ṯ (⟨بـ⟩, ⟨تـ⟩ and ⟨ثـ⟩), the same goes for q ⟨ق⟩ and f ⟨ف⟩ which have the same linked initial and medial shapes (⟨قـ⟩, ⟨فـ⟩) and are only differentiated by the dots.

Adding dots (إِعْجَام iʻjām) is an essential part of the 28 letter Arabic alphabet represented by only 18 basic backbone letter-shapes (glyphs). Two letter-shapes represent 3 phonemes, ⟨ٮ⟩ (b t ṯ) and ⟨ح⟩ (j ħ kh), and 6 shapes each represent 2 phonemes. Below are the shapes of letters dotless and with dots:

Current shapes of the Arabic letters
dotless	ﺍ	ٮ*			ح			د		ر		س		ص		ط		ع	
Phoneme	/ʔ/, /aː/	/b/	/t/	/θ/	/d͡ʒ/	/ħ/	/x/	/d/	/ð/	/r/	/z/	/s/	/ʃ/	/sˤ/	/dˤ/	/tˤ/	/ðˤ/	/ʕ/	/ɣ/
with dots	ﺍ	ب	ت	ث	ج	ح	خ	د	ذ	ر	ز	س	ش	ص	ض	ط	ظ	ع	غ
dotless	ڡ*	ٯ*			ك			ل		م		ں*		ه		و		ى	
Phoneme	/f/	/q/			/k/			/l/		/m/		/n/		/h/	/h/, /t/	/w/, /uː/		/j/, /iː/	/aː/
with dots	ف	ق			ك			ل		م		ن		ه	ة	و		ي	ى

Notes:

1. The dotless shapes ⟨ٮ⟩, ⟨ڡ⟩, ⟨ٯ⟩ and ⟨ں⟩ are never used in Arabic.
2. Two additional letters that appear only word-final are the dotless ⟨ى⟩ ("ألف مقصورة alif maqṣūrah") which is used for /aː/ in some words (instead of ⟨ا⟩), and the dotted ⟨ة⟩ ("تاء مربوطة tāʾ marbūṭah") which indicates /h/ (or /t/ in construct state) at the end of feminine nouns and adjectives as in رِسَالَة /ri.saː.lah/ "message" which becomes رِسَالَة /ri.saː.lat/ in the construct state as in رسالة الملكة /ri.saː.lat al.ma.li.kah/ "the queen's message", it also appears in some masculine nouns, e.g. حمزة /ħam.zah/.

Some features of the Arabic alphabet arose because of differences between Qur'anic spelling and the form of Classical Arabic that was phonemically and orthographically standardized later. These include:

- tā' marbūta: This arose because, in many dialects, the -at ending of feminine nouns (tā' marbūta) was lenited over time and was often pronounced as -ah and written as h. This pronunciation eventually became standard, and so to avoid altering Quranic spelling, the dots of t were written over the h.
- y (alif maksura ى) used to spell ā at the ends of some words: This arose because ā arising from contraction where single y dropped out between vowels was in some dialects pronounced at the ends of words with the tongue further forward than for other ā vowels, and as a result in the Qu'ran it was written as y.
- ā not written as alif in some words: The Arabic spelling of Allāh was decided before the Arabs started using alif to spell ā. In other cases (for example the first ā in hāðā = "this"), it may be that some dialects pronounced those vowels short.
- hamza: Originally alif was used to spell the glottal stop. But Meccans did not pronounce the glottal stop, replacing it with w, y or nothing, lengthening an adjacent vowel, or, intervocalically, dropping the glottal stop and contracting the vowels. Thus, Arabic grammarians invented the hamza diacritic sign and used it to mark the glottal stop.

== Reorganization of the alphabet ==
Less than a century later, Arab grammarians reorganized the alphabet, for reasons of teaching, putting letters next to other letters which were nearly the same shape. This produced a new order which was not the same as the numeric order, which became less important over time because it was being competed with by the Indian numerals and sometimes by the Greek numerals.

The Arabic grammarians of North Africa changed the new letters, which explains the differences between the alphabets of the East and the Maghreb.

The old alphabetical order, as in the other alphabets shown here, is known as the Levantine or Abjadi order. If the letters are arranged by their numeric order, the Levantine order is restored:

Arabic		Hebrew		Syriac		Greek		Value
ʾalif	ا	ʾālep̄	א	ʾālap̄	ܐ	alpha	Α	1
bāʾ	ب	bēṯ	ב	bēṯ	ܒ	bēta	Β	2
ǧīm	ج	gimel	ג	gāmal	ܓ	gamma	Γ	3
dāl	د	dāleṯ	ד	dālaṯ	ܕ	delta	Δ	4
hāʾ	ه	hē	ה	hē	ܗ	epsilon	Ε	5
wāw	و	wāw	ו	wāw	ܘ	wau	Ϝ	6
zāy	ز	zayin	ז	zayn	ܙ	zēta	Ζ	7
ḥāʾ	ح	ḥēṯ	ח	ḥēṯ	ܚ	ēta	Η	8

(Note: here "numeric order" means the traditional values when these letters were used as numbers. See Arabic numerals, Greek numerals and Hebrew numerals for more details)
This order is much the oldest. The first written records of the Arabic alphabet show why the order was changed.

== Abbasid standardizations ==
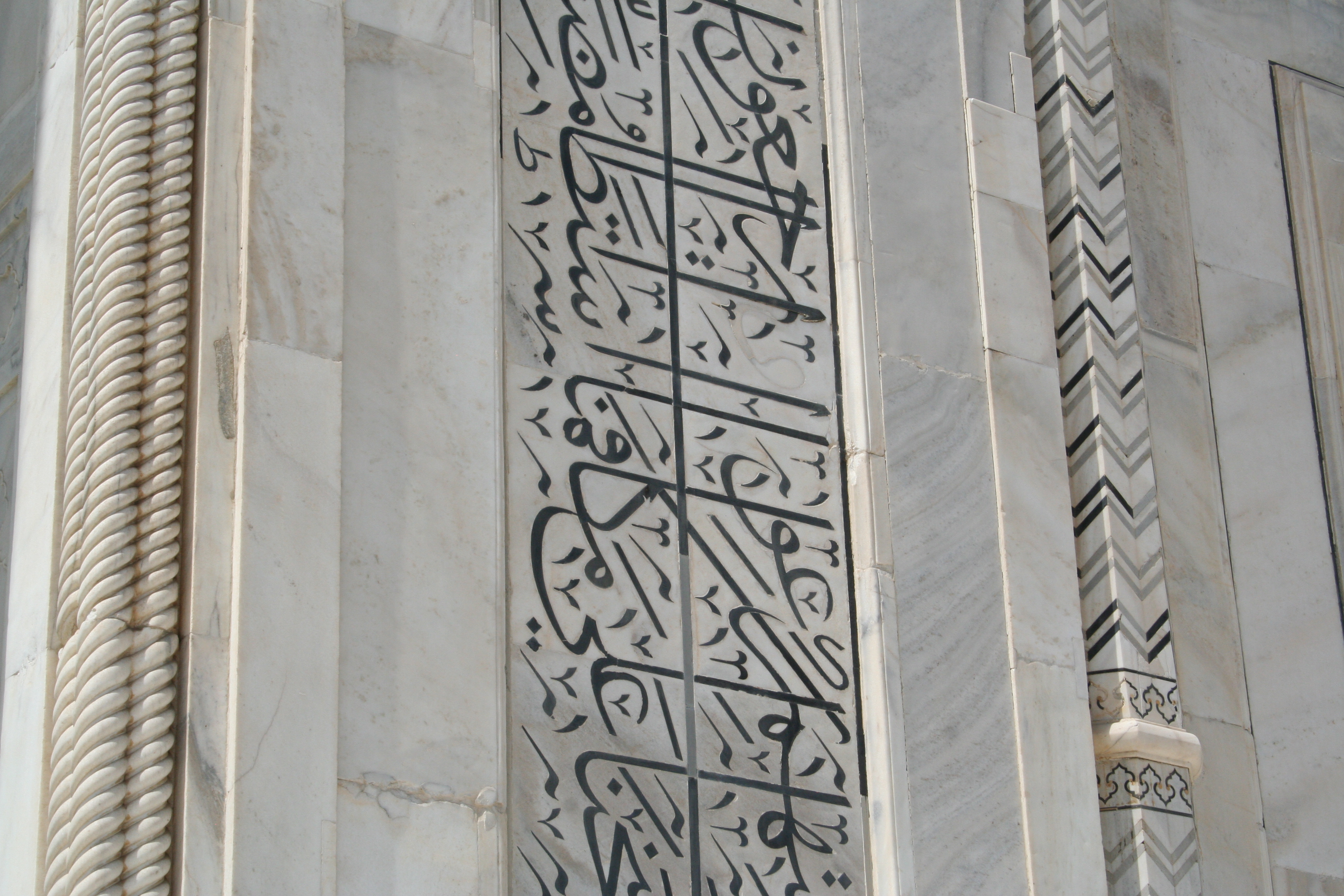
An image of the Taj Mahal featuring marble lettering in the thuluth script, a style attributed to Ibn Muqla (886-940).

Arabic script reached a climax in aesthetics and geographic spread under the Abbasid Caliphate. In this period, Ibn al-Bawwab and Ibn Muqla had the most influence on the standardization of Arabic script. They were associated with al-khatt al-mansūb (الخط المنسوب), or "proportioned script."

== Adapting the Arabic alphabet for other languages ==
Language family	Austron.		Dravid.	Turkic				Indo-European							Niger–Con.
Language/script	Pegon	Jawi	Arwi	Azeri	Kazakh	Uyghur	Uzbek	Sindhi	Punjabi	Urdu	Persian	Pashto*	Balochi	Kurdish	Swahili
/t͡ʃ/	چ														
/ʒ/	∅			ژ											
/p/	ڤ		ڣ	پ											
/g/	ؼ	ݢ	ࢴ	ق	گ										ڠ
/v/	∅	ۏ	و		ۆ	ۋ	و					∅		ڤ	
/ŋ/	ڠ		ࢳ	ݣ	ڭ		نگ	ڱ	ن		∅				نݝ
/ɲ/	ۑ	ڽ	ݧ	∅				ڃ	ن		∅				نْي
/ɳ/	∅		ڹ	∅				ڻ	ݨ	ن	∅	ڼ	∅		

When the Arabic alphabet spread to countries which used other languages, extra letters had to be invented to spell non-Arabic sounds. Usually the alteration was three dots above like ژ, ڠ, ڭ and څ or below like چ, ؼ and پ.

- Urdu: retroflex sounds: as the corresponding dentals but with a small letter ط above. (This problem in adapting a Semitic alphabet to write Indian languages also arose long before this: see Brahmi)
- This book shows an example of ch (Polish cz) being written as ڛ in an Arabic-Polish bilingual Quran for Muslim Tatars living in Poland.
- There are broadly two standards for Pashto orthography, the Afghan orthography in Afghanistan and the Peshawar orthography in Pakistan where /g/ is represented by ګ instead of the Afghani گ.

== Decline in use by non-Arabic states ==
Since the early 20th century, as the Ottoman Empire collapsed and European influence increased, many non-Arab Islamic areas began using the Cyrillic or Latin alphabet, and local adaptations of the Arabic alphabet were abandoned. In many cases, the writing of a language in Arabic script has become restricted to classical texts and traditional purposes (as in the Turkic States of Central Asia, or Hausa and others in West Africa), while in others, the Arabic alphabet is used alongside the Latin one (as with Jawi in Brunei).

Area used	Arabic spelling system	New spelling system	Date	Ordered by
Some constituent republics in the Soviet Union, especially Muslim States	Persian-based spelling system, later Ottoman Turkish alphabet with alterations	Cyrillic	1920s (to Janalif); 1930s (to Cyrillic)	USSR government
Bosnia and Herzegovina	Ottoman Turkish alphabet	Gaj's Latin alphabet	1870s-1918	
Brunei; Indonesia; Malaysia; Philippines (Mindanao); Thailand (Pattani)	Jawi (still widely used in Brunei and Patani) and Pegon script	Latin alphabet and Thai script	19th century	European (British, Dutch and Spanish) colonial administrations
Turkey	Ottoman Turkish alphabet	Turkish alphabet (Latin system with alterations)	1928	Republic of Turkey government after the fall of the Ottoman Empire
Iberia (Al-Andalus), modern day Spain and Portugal	Aljamiado	Latin alphabet	16th century	

== See also ==
- Abjad
- Levantine order
- Writing
