= Himaitic =

Ancient Arabian script from the Hima region

- Script type: Abjad
- Period: Uncertain; pre-Islamic
- Direction: Mainly right-to-left in southern Thamudic/Himaitic examples
- Region: Hima, southwestern Saudi Arabia
- Languages: Uncertain; Himaitic inscriptions

Related scripts
- Parent systems: South Semitic scripts: Ancient North Arabian; Himaitic

Himaitic is a pre-Islamic Arabian script variety from the Ancient North Arabian family attested mainly in the region of Hima north-east of Najran in southwestern Saudi Arabia. It is formerly known as Thamudic F and has also been labelled Southern Thamudic.

The core area of Himaitic is Hima, about 100 km north-east of Najran in southwestern Saudi Arabia. In antiquity, Hima lay on routes leading from South Arabia northwards and eastwards across the Arabian Peninsula. The site was a northern commercial offshoot of the Najran oasis in the pre-Islamic trans-Arabian trade network. The Hima landscape has thousands of rock inscriptions carved by locals, as well as people travelling by through caravans and armies, into its sandstone. Most of the tens of thousands of inscriptions in the desert region north of Najran belong to Himaitic, whose use extended north toward Tathlith. About 9,000 of these inscriptions have been published into the database OCIANA.

The corpus of Himaitic inscriptions consists mainly of short rock graffiti, especially of personal names and carving formulae. Its chronology and linguistic classification remain uncertain. The Hima region itself was along a trade route that linked southern to northern and eastern Arabia, and it was a contact zone for several populations and writing systems.

The chronology of Himaitic remains uncertain. Ancient North Arabian scripts as a wider group are documented from the first millennium BCE into the early centuries CE, but this broader range is not a secure date range for Himaitic itself.

== Name and classification ==
The name Himaitic derives from Hima, the major Arabian site that the script was discovered in.

Himaitic belongs graphically to the South Semitic alphabetic tradition, which includes the Ancient North Arabian and Ancient South Arabian scripts used in Arabia before Islam.

The older term "Thamudic" is a residual label for inscriptions in Ancient North Arabian alphabets that have not yet been fully understood or categorized. It is unrelated to the ancient tribe of Thamud.

== Research history ==
Nineteenth- and early twentieth-century scholarship grouped many North Arabian graffiti under the broad heading "Thamudic". Frederick V. Winnett divided the varieties of Thamudic known in 1937 into categories A, B, C, D, and E. Later reassessment reclassified Thamudic A as Taymanitic and Thamudic E as Hismaic, while Thamudic B, C, D, and the southern or F group remained less securely defined.

MacDonald's 2000 reclassification became an important framework for the terminology of pre-Islamic North and Central Arabian scripts, distinguishing oasis scripts such as Dadanitic, Taymanitic, and Dumaitic from desert scripts such as Safaitic, Hismaic, and the remaining Thamudic groups.

The Philby-Ryckmans expedition recorded about 9,000 Southern Thamudic inscriptions in southwestern Saudi Arabia in 1951. According to the database OCIANA, this material is now called Himaitic or Thamudic F.

The inscriptions of the Hima region were surveyed in 2007 by the Saudi-French Archaeological and Epigraphic Mission to Najran. Further work in 2016 by Christian J. Robin and Maria Gorea was foundational in helping to isolate and decipher Himaitic as a distinct script variety.

== Script and language ==
Himaitic is a consonantal alphabet. It is an Ancient North Arabian script belonging to the wider South Semitic family. According to Al-Jallad and Prioletta, Himaitic shares some elements with Thamudic D and Ancient South Arabian. For example, some characteristic Himaitic glyphs resemble Thamudic B, others resemble Ancient South Arabian, and others are distinctive to the Hima alphabet.

Some Himaitic inscriptions like OCIANA PNTH 3 are recorded as right-to-left and hammered, although other layouts and techniques were possible.

The Himaitic corpus consists mostly of short graffiti rather than formal monumental texts, primarily personal names.

The definite article appears in several forms in Himaitic, including forms transcribed as hl, ʾl, h, hn, and ʾ. Al-Jallad treats this as important evidence for article variation in pre-Islamic Arabia, but not as sufficient evidence by itself for classifying the language. He also notes the presence of the Ancient South Arabian suffix -n and cases in which personal names are marked with mimation.

A possible word-initial shift from w to y has been proposed for forms such as wqr/yqr and wdd/ydd. OCIANA PNTH 3 gives a concrete example: the text ywyṯʿ yqr lbʾ is translated "Ywyṯʿ carved (the) lion", and the entry explains yqr as reflecting initial w > y. Himaitic inscriptions may also be associated with drawings, as in PNTH 3, where the text is associated with a lion drawing.

== Contents ==
A study by Alessia Prioletta provided the first extensive lexical and semantic look at the Himaitic corpus. Prioletta surveyed the presence of kinship and social relations; the natural world, including animals, plants, and landscape; spatio-temporal orientation; and writing practices and media. The study reports lexical isoglosses with Safaitic and Thamudic D, while emphasizing Himaitic's own thematic preferences, rare or unique lexemes, and the relative absence of conventional inscriptional themes such as warfare and religious formulae.

Prioletta also focuses on the thousands of names that occur in the Himaitic corpus as a source for the cultural and linguistic setting of the broader region: over 23,800 personal names are recorded from the MAFSN corpus. Name structure, linguistic patterns, and theophoric elements across the Himaitic-Thamudic and Ancient South Arabian script traditions have been considered towards this end. According to Prioletta, the name (onomastics) data indicate a complex ethnolinguistic landscape where many different populations interacted across time periods.

== See also ==
- Ancient North Arabian
- Thamudic
- Safaitic
- Hismaic
- Ancient South Arabian script
- Hima Cultural Area
