= Proto-Arabic language =

Hypothetical ancestor language of Arabic varieties

Proto-Arabic
- Reconstruction of: Varieties of Arabic
- Era: before 9th century BC
- Reconstructed ancestors: Proto-Afroasiatic: Proto-Semitic

Proto-Arabic is the name given to the hypothetical reconstructed ancestor of all the varieties of Arabic attested since the 9th century BC.

== Evidence ==
There are two lines of evidence to reconstruct Proto-Arabic:

- Evidence of Arabic becomes more frequent in the 2nd century BC, with the documentation of Arabic names in the Nabataean script as well as evidence of an Arabic substratum in the Nabataean language.
- The Safaitic and Hismaic inscriptions were composed between the 1st century BC and the 4th century AD, in the Syrian desert. They are also crucial to the reconstruction of Proto-Arabic, since they show many features that are shared by epigraphic Old South Arabian and Classical Arabic. The common features set them apart from languages that are documented further south, such as Dadanitic and Taymanitic (see characteristics below).

Old Arabic in the Nabataean script is first attested in the Negev desert in the 1st century BC, but it becomes more frequent in the region after the decline of Safaitic and Hismaic. From the 4th century AD, Old Arabic inscriptions are attested from Northern Syria to the Hejaz, in a script that is intermediate between cursive Nabataean and the Kufic script of Islamic times.

== Homeland ==
Based on documentary evidence, the urheimat of Proto-Arabic may be within the Syrian desert between northwest Arabia and the southern Levant.

== Evolution ==
There is confusion with the application of the terms "pre-classical Arabic," "Proto-Arabic" and "Old Arabic." This is sometimes the name given to ancient epigraphic North Arabian languages. Sabatino Moscati called them "pre-classical", Georgi Akhvlediani called them "proto-Arabic", Johann Fück, Haim Rabin, Ibrahim al-Samarrai and Karl Brockelmann called them "ancient Arabic". Brockelmann considered the epigraphic North Arabian languages to be among the ancient Arabic dialects that are not identical to Late Classical Arabic.

Applying such a name to the North Arabian languages is an error. Ancient Arabic apparently coexisted with North Arabian but, unlike them, remained a purely spoken language. Dutch scholar Emery van Donzel considered "Old Arabic (Proto-Arabic) language" to be one of three stages in the development of Preclassic Arabic, following the Semitic Arabian languages and preceding Early Arabic of the 3rd to 6th centuries. There are also those who refer to the North Arabian languages as "Proto-Arabic" and distinguish between them and Preclassic Arabic.

Agathangel of Crimea defined the period of existence of the Old Arabic (pre-classical) language as the V-VIII centuries (until 750), followed by the classical caliphate period (VIII-XI centuries), the post-classical period (XI-XV centuries), and then the period of decline (XVI-XVIII centuries).

Late Preclassic dialects, both urban and Bedouin, are described to some extent by early Arab philologists. New Arabic or Middle Arabic, which became the urban language of the Arab Caliphate in the 8th century, emerged from pre-classical Arabic dialects, which continued to develop until modern Arabic dialects, showing tremendous changes.

== Characteristics ==
There are several features shared by Classical Arabic, the varieties of Modern Arabic and the Safaitic and Hismaic inscriptions that are unattested in any other Semitic language variety, including the Dadanitic and Taymanitic languages of the northern Hejaz. They are evidence of common descent from a hypothetical ancestor, Proto-Arabic. The following features can be reconstructed with confidence for Proto-Arabic:

1. negative particles m */mā/; lʾn */lā-ʾan/ > CAr lan
2. mafʿūl G-passive participle
3. prepositions and adverbs f, ʿn, ʿnd, ḥt, ʿkdy
4. a subjunctive in -a
5. t-demonstratives
6. leveling of the -at allomorph of the feminine ending
7. ʾn complementizer and subordinator
8. the use of f- to introduce modal clauses
9. independent object pronoun in (ʾ)y
10. vestiges of nunation

== See also ==
- Classification of Arabic languages
