= Sinaitic script =

Sinaitic script could refer to:

- Nabataean script, the script previously known as Sinaitic as most examples were found in the Sinai
- Proto-Sinaitic script, the predecessor script
