= Thamudic =

Ancient Arabian script family

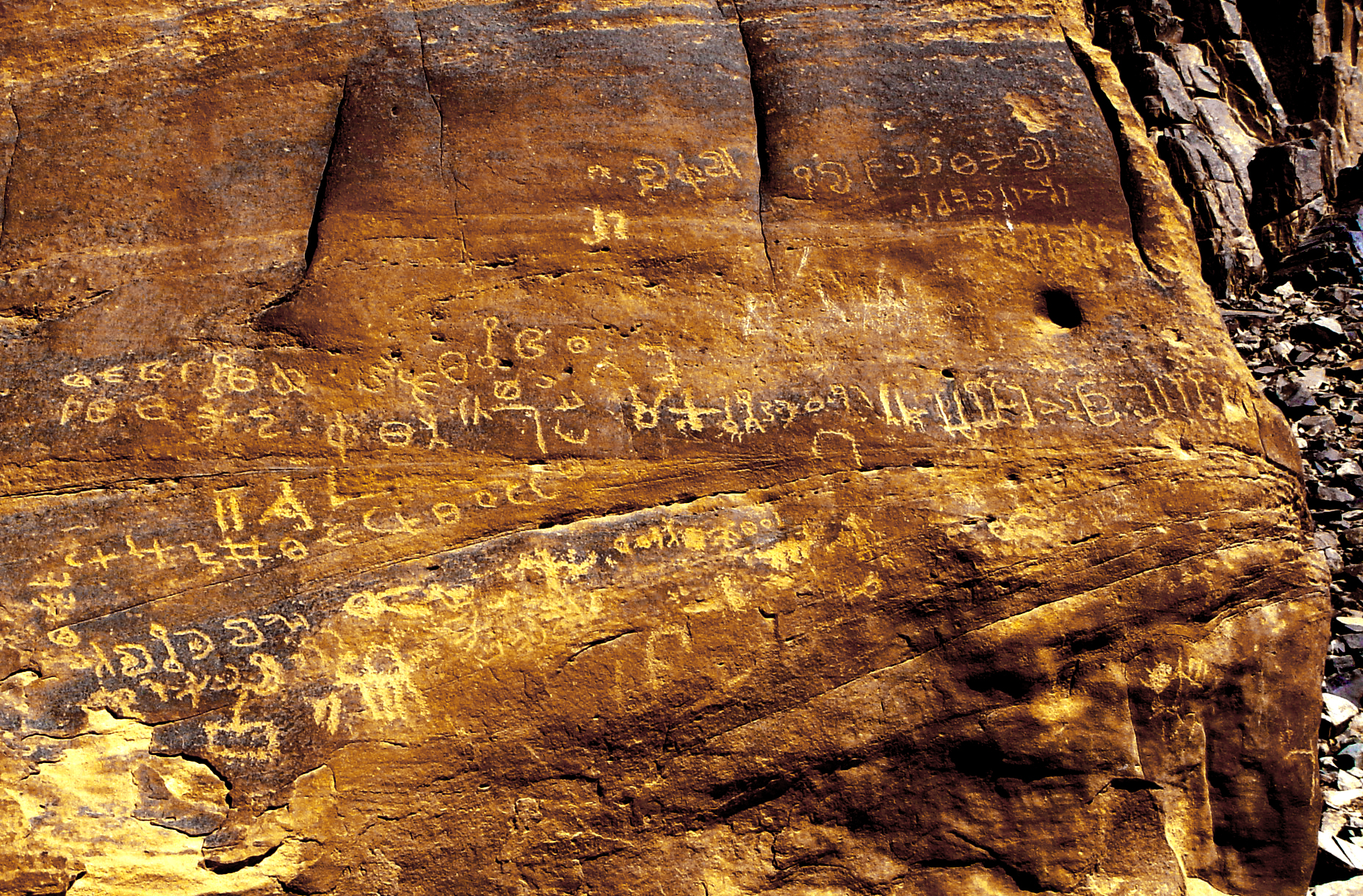
Thamudic inscriptions at Wadi Rum.

Thamudic, named for the Thamud tribe, is a group of epigraphic scripts known from large numbers of inscriptions in Ancient North Arabian (ANA) alphabets, which have not yet been properly studied. These texts are found over a huge area from southern Syria to Yemen. In 1937, Fred V. Winnett divided those known at the time into five rough categories A, B, C, D, E. In 1951, some 9,000 more inscriptions were recorded in south-west Saudi Arabia which have been given the name Southern Thamudic.

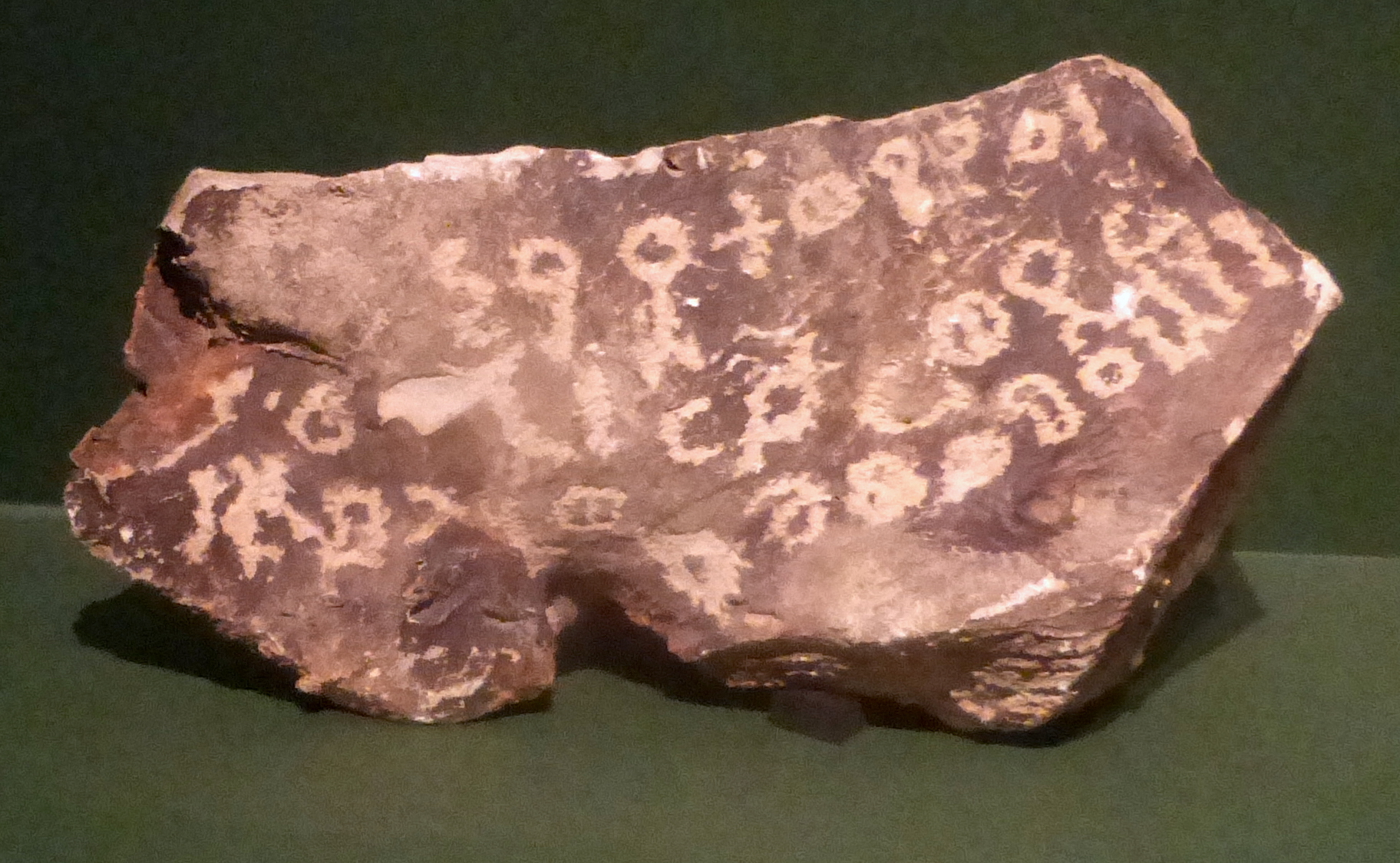
Thamudic F

Thamudic A is now known as Taymanitic. Thamudic E is now known as Hismaic. Himaitic, or Southern Thamudic, is also known as Thamudic F.

== Varieties ==
=== Taymanitic (Thamudic A) ===
Taymanitic was the language and script of the oasis of Taymāʾ in northwestern Arabia, dated to the second half of the 6th century BC.

=== Thamudic B ===
The Thamudic B inscriptions are concentrated in Northwest Arabia, but can be occasionally found in Syria, Egypt, and Yemen.

=== Thamudic C ===
The Thamudic C inscriptions are concentrated in the Najd, but can be found elsewhere across western Arabia as well. They typically contain the word wdd, of unknown meaning.

=== Thamudic D ===
Thamudic D inscriptions are concentrated in northwest Arabia, and one occurs alongside a Nabataean tomb inscription in Hegra (Mada'in Salih) dated to the year 267 CE (JSNab 17). Many inscriptions start with the word 'n "I (am)", previously misread as zn and interpreted as a demonstrative pronoun, "this (is)".

=== Hismaic (Thamudic E) ===
Hismaic is a variety of the Ancient North Arabian script used to write the Safaitic of Old Arabic.

=== Himaitic (Thamudic F, Southern Thamudic) ===
Himaitic texts come from the southwestern part of the Arabian Peninsula and seem to contain only names, although some of these names contain mimation and one example of a hl- */hal/ definite article.
