= Old Arabic =

Earliest stage of the Arabic language before Islam

- اللغة العربية القديمة
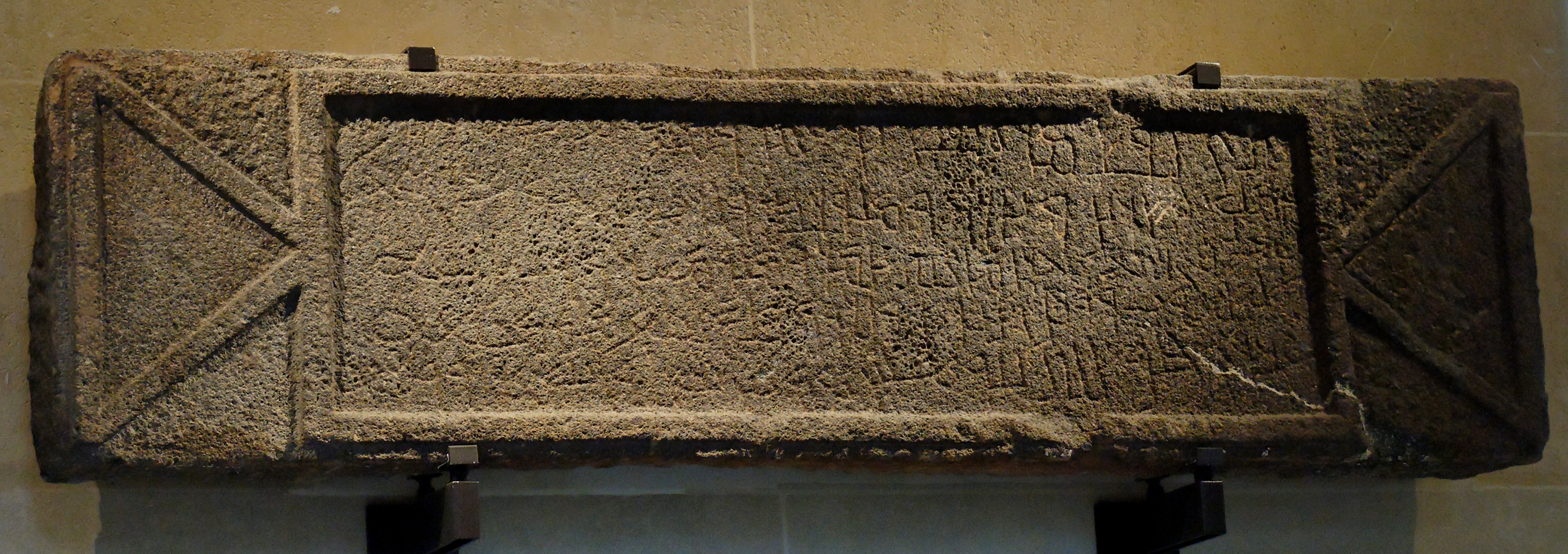
- Epitaph of Imru al-Qays I ibn Amr (328 AD)
- Region: Southern Levant and Northwestern Arabian Peninsula
- Era: Early 1st millennium BCE to 7th century CE
- Language family: Afroasiatic: Semitic; West Semitic; Central Semitic; Old Arabic
- Early form: Proto-Arabic
- Writing system: Safaitic; Hismaic; Dadanitic; Nabataean; Phoenician; Arabic; Greek

Language codes
- ISO 639-3: None (mis)
- Glottolog: None

Old Arabic is the name for any Arabic language or dialect continuum before Islam. Various forms of Old Arabic are attested in scripts like Safaitic, Hismaic, Nabatean, and Greek, most of which seem to be concentrated in the southern Levant.

Alternatively, the term has been used synonymously with "Paleo-Arabic" to describe the form of the Arabic script in the fifth and sixth centuries.

== Classification ==
Old Arabic and its descendants are classified as Central Semitic languages, which is an intermediate language group also containing the Northwest Semitic languages (e.g., Aramaic and Hebrew), the languages of the Dadanitic and Taymanitic inscriptions, the poorly understood languages labeled Thamudic, and the ancient languages of Yemen written in the Ancient South Arabian script. Old Arabic is distinguished from the rest of the group by the following innovations:

1. negative particles m */mā/; lʾn */lā-ʾan/ > CAr lan
2. mafʿūl G-passive participle
3. prepositions and adverbs f, ʿn, ʿnd, ḥt, ʿkdy
4. a subjunctive in -a
5. t-demonstratives
6. leveling of the -at allomorph of the feminine ending
7. the use of f- to introduce modal clauses
8. independent object pronoun in (ʾ)y
9. vestiges of nunation

== History ==
=== Early 1st millennium BCE ===
The oldest known attestation of the Arabic language dubbed as pre-Historic Arabic language is a bi-lingual inscription written in Old Arabic which was written in the undifferentiated North Arabian script (known as Thamudic B) and Canaanite which remains undeciphered, discovered in Bayir, Jordan.

Prayer to the Canaanite gods
Transliteration + Transcription + Translation

h mlkm w kms1 w qws1 b km ʿwḏn
haː malkamu wa kamaːsu wa kʼawsu bi kumu ʕawuðnaː
"O Malkom and Kemosh and Qaws, in ye we seek refuge"

A characteristic of Nabataean Arabic and Old Hijazi (from which Classical Arabic much later developed) is the definite article al-. The first unambiguous literary attestation of Old Arabic and this feature occurs in the 5th century BCE, in the epithet of a goddess which Herodotus (Histories I: 131, III: 8) quotes in its preclassical Arabic form as Alilat (Ἀλιλάτ, i. e.,ʼal-ʼilāt), which means "the goddess". It also occurs in Aramaic ostraca dated to the 5th century BCE during the period of Achaemenid rule in Palestine in the Negev, an area that would form part of the (future) Nabataean Kingdom.

A later piece of inscriptional evidence for this form of the article is provided by a 1st-century BCE inscription in Qaryat al-Faw (formerly Qaryat Dhat Kahil, near Sulayyil, Saudi Arabia).

The earliest datable Safaitic inscriptions go back to the 3rd century BCE, but the vast majority of texts are undatable and so may stretch back much further in time.

=== 4th century BCE ===
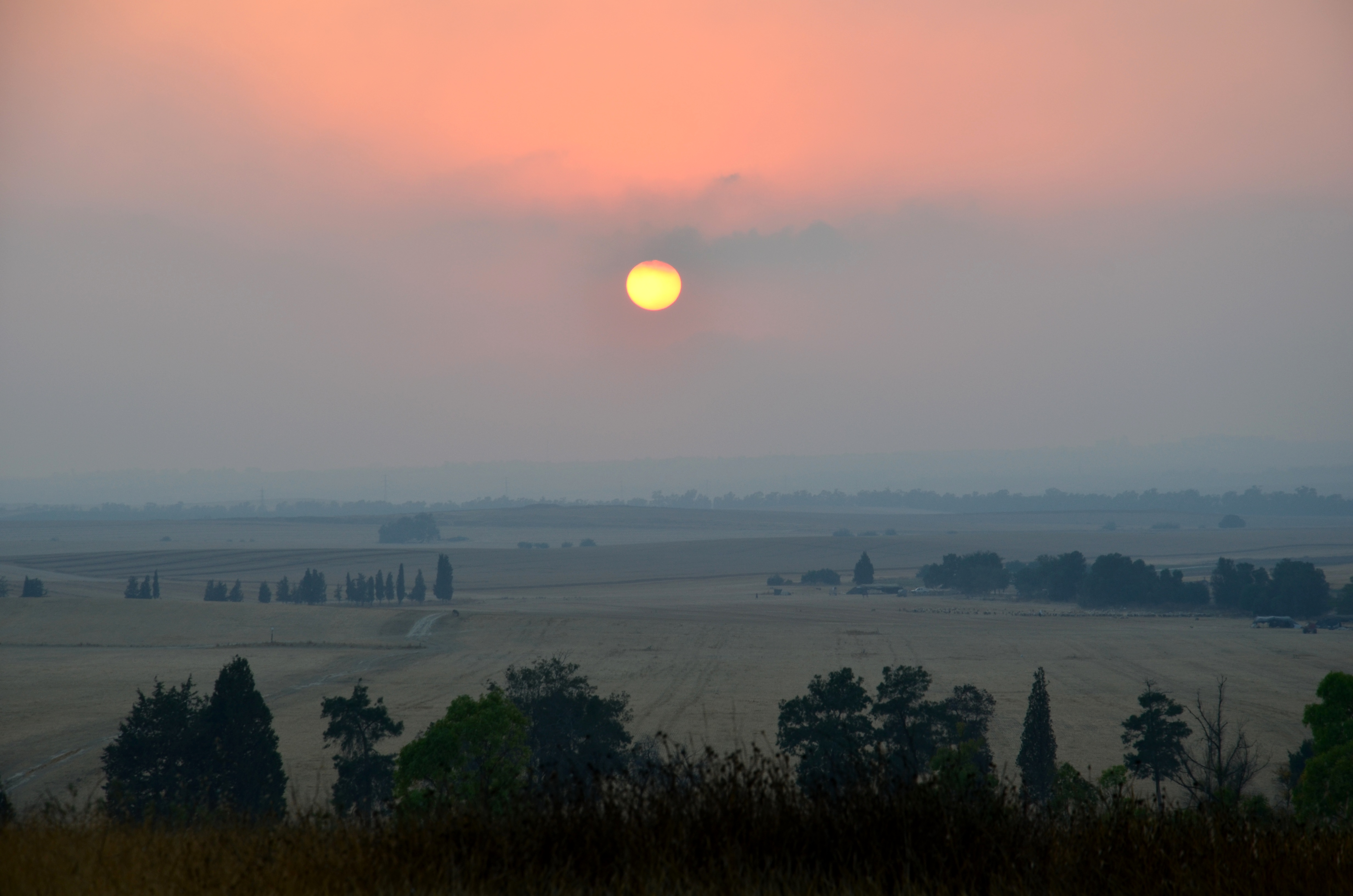
Northern Negev

Aramaic ostraca dated 362–301 BC bear witness to the presence of people of Edomite origin in the southern Shephelah and the Beersheva Valley before the Hellenistic period. They contain personal names that apparently have Arabic etymologies:

1. whb, qws-whb (opposed to Northwest Semitic yhb), ytʿ as opposed to Aramaic ysʿ and Hebrew yšʿ
2. quṭaylu diminutives: šʿydw, ʿbydw, nhyrw, zbydw
3. personal names ending in -w (wawation): ʿzyzw, ʿbdw, nmrw, mlkw, ḥlfw, zydw
4. personal names ending in feminine -t (as opposed to Aramaic and Hebrew -h): yʿft, ḥlft
5. personal names ending in -n [-aːn]: 'drn, mṭrn, ḥlfn, zydn

=== 2nd century BCE – 1st century CE ===
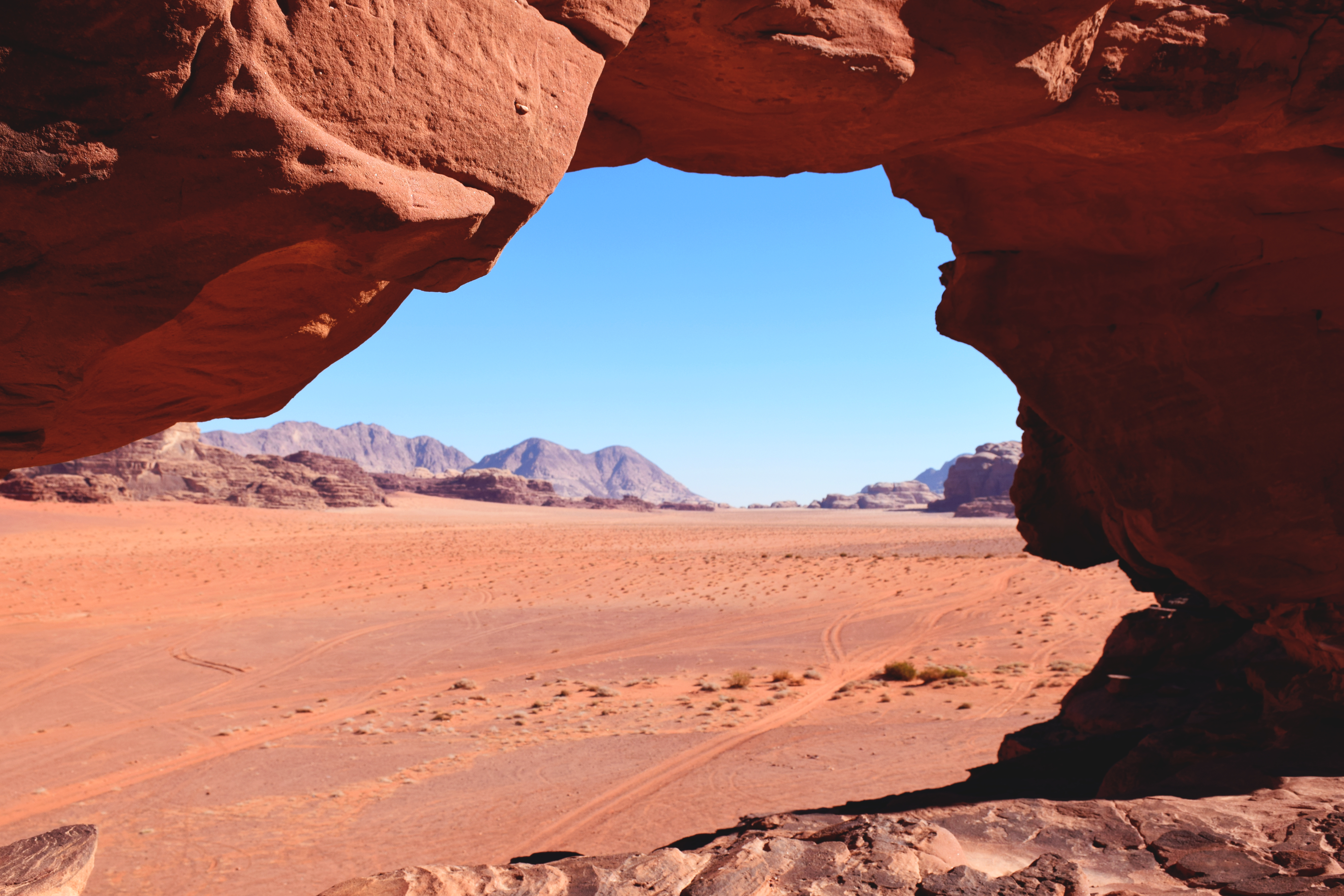
Wadi Rum

Hismaic inscriptions, contemporaneous with the Nabatean Kingdom attest a variety of Old Arabic which may have merged [ð] with [d]. Furthermore, there are 52 Hismaic inscriptions which attest the formula ḏkrt lt [ðakarat allaːtu] "May Allāt be mindful of", foreshadowing similar formulae which are attested in Christian contexts from northern Syria to northern Arabia during the 6th and possibly 7th centuries CE. One such inscription, found near Wadi Rum, is given below:

Hismaic prayer to Allat
Transliteration + Transcription + Translation

l ʼbs1lm bn qymy d ʼl gs2m w dkrt-n lt w dkrt {ltws2yʽ-n} kll-hm
*Li- ʼabs¹alām bin qayyemyV dū/ī ʼāl gas²m uwa dakaratn āllāt uwa dakarat {allāt uwa s²yaʽnā} kulilhum
By Absalām son of Qayyimyā of the lineage of Gašmū. And may (A)llāt be mindful of us and may (A)llāt be mindful of all our companions.

=== 2nd century CE ===
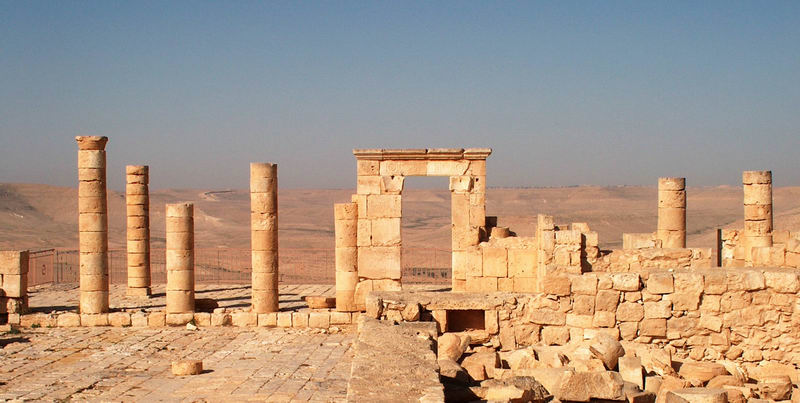
Temple of Obodas

The En Avdat inscription dates to no later than 150 CE, and contains a prayer to the deified Nabataean king Obodas I:

Prayer to Obodas
Transliteration + Transcription + Translation

pypʿl lʾ pdʾ w lʾ ʾṯrʾ
pajepʕal laː pedaːʔ wa laː ʔaθara
And he acts neither for benefit nor favour

pkn hnʾ ybʿnʾ ʾlmwtw lʾ
pakaːn honaː jabɣenaː ʔalmawto laː
and if death claims us let me not

ʾbʿh pkn hnʾ ʾrd grḥw lʾ yrdnʾ
ʔabɣæːh pakaːn honaː ʔaraːd gorħo laː jorednaː
be claimed. And if an affliction occurs let it not afflict us

=== 3rd–4th century CE ===
The dated, third-century inscription JSNab 17 contains a mix of Nabataean Aramaic and Old Arabic. In 2025, another mixed inscription from Saudi Arabia was recorded that has been dated to the fourth century on paleographical grounds.

=== 6th century CE ===
Zabad inscription (512 CE)

The earliest 6th-century Arabic inscription is from Zabad (512), a town near Aleppo. The Arabic inscription consists of a list of names carved on the lowest part of the lintel of a martyrion dedicated to Saint Sergius, the upper parts of which are occupied by inscriptions in Greek and Syriac.

Zabad inscription
Transliteration + Transcription (tentative) + Translation

{[ḏ ]{k}}r ʾl-ʾlh srgw BR ʾmt-mnfw w h{l/n}yʾ BR mrʾlqys [Roundel] w srgw BR sʿdw w syrw w s{.}ygw
ðakar ʔalʔelaːh serg(o) ebn {ʔamat manaːp(o)} wa haniːʔ ebn marʔalqajs {} wa serg(o) ebn saʕd(o) wa ⟨syrw⟩ wa ⟨sygw⟩
"May God be mindful of Sirgū son of ʾAmt-Manāfū and Ha{l/n}īʾ son of Maraʾ l-Qays and Sirgū son of Saʿdū and Š/Syrw and Š/S{.}ygw"

Two Arabic inscriptions, the Jebel Usays inscription (528) and the Harran inscription (568), are from the southern region on the borders of Hauran.

=== 7th century CE ===
The Qur'an, as standardized by Uthman (r. 644 – 656), is the first Arabic codex still extant, and the first non-inscriptional attestation of the Old Hijazi dialect. The Birmingham Quran manuscript was radiocarbon dated to between 568 and 645 CE, and contains parts of chapters 18, 19, and 20.

PERF 558 (643 CE) is the oldest Christian Arabic text, the first Christian papyrus.

The Zuhayr inscription (644 CE) is the oldest Islamic rock inscription. It references the death of Umar, and is notable for its fully fledged system of dotting.

A Christian Arabic inscription, known as the Yazid inscription, possibly mentions Yazid I and is notable for its continuation of 6th century Christian Arabic formulae as well as maintaining pre-Islamic letter shapes and wawation.

== Phonology ==
=== Consonants ===
Consonant phonemes of Old Arabic (based on Safaitic and Greek transcriptions)
		Labial	Dental		Denti-alveolar		Palatal	Velar		Pharyngeal	Glottal
		Labial	plain	emphatic	plain	emphatic	Palatal	plain	emphatic	Pharyngeal	Glottal
Nasal		[m] m – م			[n] n – ن						
Stop	voiceless	[pʰ] p – ف			[tʰ] t – ت	[tʼ] ṭ – ط		[kʰ] k – ك	[kʼ] q – ق		[ʔ] ʾ – ء
Stop	voiced	[b] b – ب			[d] d – د			[g] g – ج			
Fricative	voiceless		[θ] ṯ – ث	[tθʼ] (Note: The emphatic interdental and lateral were voiced in Old Higazi, in contrast to Northern Old Arabic, where they remained voiceless.) ṯ̣ – ظ	[s] s – س	[tsʼ] ṣ – ص		[x] ẖ – خ		[ħ] ḥ – ح	[h] h – ه
Fricative	voiced		[ð] ḏ – ذ		[z] z – ز			[ɣ] ġ – غ		[ʕ] ʿ – ع	
Lateral fricative					[ɬ] ś – ش	[tɬʼ] ṣ́ – ض					
Lateral					[l] l – ل						
Trill					[r] r – ر						
Approximant							[j] y – ي	[w] w – و			

=== Vowels ===
Monophthong phonemes of Nabataean Arabic
	Short		Long	
	Front	Back	Front	Back
Close			iː	uː
Mid	e	o		
Open	a		aː	

In contrast with Old Hegazi and Classical Arabic, Nabataean Arabic may have undergone the shift /e/ < */i/ and /o/ < */u/, as evidenced by the numerous Greek transcriptions of Arabic from the area. This may have occurred in Safaitic as well, making it a possible Northern Old Arabic isogloss.

Monophthong phonemes of Old Hejazi
	Short		Long	
	Front	Back	Front	Back
Close	i	u	iː	uː
Mid	(e)		eː	oː
Open	a		aː	

In contrast to Classical Arabic, Old Higazi had the phonemes /eː/ and /oː/, which arose from the contraction of Old Arabic /ajV/ and /awV/, in which V was a short unstressed vowel, respectively. The reduction of /eː/ in closed syllables resulted in either short /a/ or /e/.

== Grammar ==
=== Nominal Inflection ===
==== Proto-Arabic ====
Nominal inflection
	Triptote	Diptote	Dual	Plural	
	Triptote	Diptote	Dual	Masculine	Feminine
Nominative	-un	-u	-āni	-ūna	-ātun
Accusative	-an	-a	-ayni	-īna	-ātin
Genitive	-in	-a	-ayni	-īna	-ātin

==== Early Nabataean Arabic ====
The ʿEn ʿAvdat inscription in the Nabataean script dating to no later than 150 CE shows that final [n] had been deleted in undetermined triptotes, and that the final short vowels of the determined state were intact. The Old Arabic of the Nabataean inscriptions exhibits almost exclusively the form ʾl- of the definite article. Unlike Classical Arabic, this ʾl almost never exhibits the assimilation of the coda to the coronals.

Nominal inflection
	Triptote	Diptote	Dual	Plural	
	Triptote	Diptote	Dual	Masculine	Feminine
Nominative	(ʾal-)...-o	-∅	(ʾal-)...-ān	(ʾal-)...-ūn	(ʾal-)...-āto?
Accusative	(ʾal-)...-a	-∅	(ʾal-)...-ayn	(ʾal-)...-īn	(ʾal-)...-āte?
Genitive	(ʾal-)...-e	-∅	(ʾal-)...-ayn	(ʾal-)...-īn	(ʾal-)...-āte?

Example:

1. pa-yapʿal lā pedā wa lā ʾaṯara
2. pa-kon honā yabġe-nā ʾal-mawto lā ʾabġā-h
3. pa-kon honā ʾarād gorḥo lā yorde-nā
- "And he acts neither for benefit nor favour and if death claims us let me not be claimed. And if an affliction occurs let it not afflict us".

==== Safaitic ====
The A1 inscription dated to the 3rd or 4th century in a Greek alphabet in a dialect showing affinities to that of the Safaitic inscriptions shows that short final high vowels had been lost, obliterating the distinction between nominative and genitive case in the singular, leaving the accusative the only marked case. Besides dialects with no definite article, the Safaitic inscriptions exhibit about four different article forms, ordered by frequency: h-, ʾ-, ʾl-, and hn-. Unlike the Classical Arabic article, the Old Arabic ʾl almost never exhibits the assimilation of the coda to the coronals; the same situation is attested in the Graeco-Arabica, but in A1 the coda assimilates to the following d, αδαυρα */ʾad-dawra/ 'the region'. The Safaitic and Hismaic texts attest an invariable feminine consonantal -t ending, and the same appears to be true of the earliest Nabataean Arabic. While Greek transcriptions show a mixed situation, it is clear that by the 4th c. CE, the ending had shifted to /-a(h)/ in non-construct position in the settled areas.

Nominal inflection
	Triptote	Diptote	Dual	Plural	
	Triptote	Diptote	Dual	Masculine	Feminine
Nominative	(ʾal-)...-∅	-∅	(ʾal-)...-ān	(ʾal-)...-ūn	(ʾal-)...-āt
Accusative	(ʾal-)...-a	-∅	(ʾal-)...-ayn	(ʾal-)...-īn	(ʾal-)...-āt
Genitive	(ʾal-)...-∅	-∅	(ʾal-)...-ayn	(ʾal-)...-īn	(ʾal-)...-āt

Example:

- ʾAws (bin) ʿūḏ (?) (bin) Bannāʾ (bin) Kazim ʾal-ʾidāmiyy ʾatawa miś-śiḥāṣ; ʾatawa Bannāʾa ʾad-dawra wa yirʿaw baqla bi-kānūn
- "ʾAws son of ʿūḏ (?) son of Bannāʾ son of Kazim the ʾidāmite came because of scarcity; he came to Bannāʾ in this region and they pastured on fresh herbage during Kānūn".

==== Old Hijazi (Quranic Consonantal Text) ====
The Qur'anic Consonantal Text shows no case distinction with determined triptotes, but the indefinite accusative is marked with a final /ʾ/. In JSLih 384, an early example of Old Hijazi, the Proto-Central Semitic /-t/ allomorph survives in bnt as opposed to /-ah/ < /-at/ in s^{1}lmh.

Nominal inflection
	Triptote		Diptote	Dual	Plural	
	Triptote		Diptote	Dual	Masculine	Feminine
Nominative	-∅	ʾal-...-∅	-∅	(ʾal-)...-ān	(ʾal-)...-ūn	(ʾal-)...-āt
Accusative	-ā	ʾal-...-∅	-∅	(ʾal-)...-ayn	(ʾal-)...-īn	(ʾal-)...-āt
Genitive	-∅	ʾal-...-∅	-∅	(ʾal-)...-ayn	(ʾal-)...-īn	(ʾal-)...-āt

=== Demonstrative Pronouns ===
==== Safaitic ====
Masc	Fem	Plural
ḏ, ḏ(y/n)	t, ḏ	ʾly */olay/

Northern Old Arabic preserved the original shape of the relative pronoun ḏ-, which may either have continued to inflect for case or have become frozen as ḏū or ḏī. In one case, it is preceded by the article/demonstrative prefix h-, hḏ */haḏḏV/.

In Safaitic, the existence of mood inflection is confirmed in the spellings of verbs with y/w as the third root consonant. Verbs of this class in result clauses are spelled in such a way that they must have originally terminated in /a/: f ygzy nḏr-h */pa yagziya naḏra-hu/ 'that he may fulfill his vow'. Sometimes verbs terminate in a -n which may reflect an energic ending, thus, s^{2}ʿ-nh 'join him' perhaps */śeʿannoh/.

==== Old Hijazi ====
Old Ḥiǧāzī is characterized by the innovative relative pronoun ʾallaḏī, ʾallatī, etc., which is attested once in JSLih 384 and is the common form in the QCT.

The QCT along with the papyri of the first century after the Islamic conquests attest a form with an l-element between the demonstrative base and the distal particle, producing from the original proximal set ḏālika and tilka.

== Writing systems ==
=== Safaitic and Hismaic ===
The texts composed in both scripts are almost 50,000 specimens that provide a rather detailed view of Old Arabic.

=== Dadanitic ===
A single text, JSLih 384, composed in the Dadanitic script, from northwest Arabia, provides the only non-Nabataean example of Old Arabic from the Hijaz.

=== Greek ===
Fragmentary evidence in the Greek script, the "Graeco-Arabica", is equally crucial to help complete our understanding of Old Arabic. It encompasses instances of Old Arabic in Greek transcription from documentary sources. The advantage of the Greek script is that it gives us a clear view of the vowels of Old Arabic and can shed light on the phonetic realization of the Old Arabic phonemes. A single pre-Islamic Arabic text composed in Greek letters is known, labelled A1.

=== Aramaic and successors ===
==== Nabataean ====
Only two texts composed fully in Arabic have been discovered in the Nabataean script. The En Avdat inscription contains two lines of an Arabic prayer or hymn embedded in an Aramaic votive inscription. The second is the Namara inscription, 328 CE, which was erected about 60 miles (97 km) southeast of Damascus. Most examples of Arabic come from the substratal influence the language exercised on Nabataean Aramaic.

==== Nabataean Arabic ====
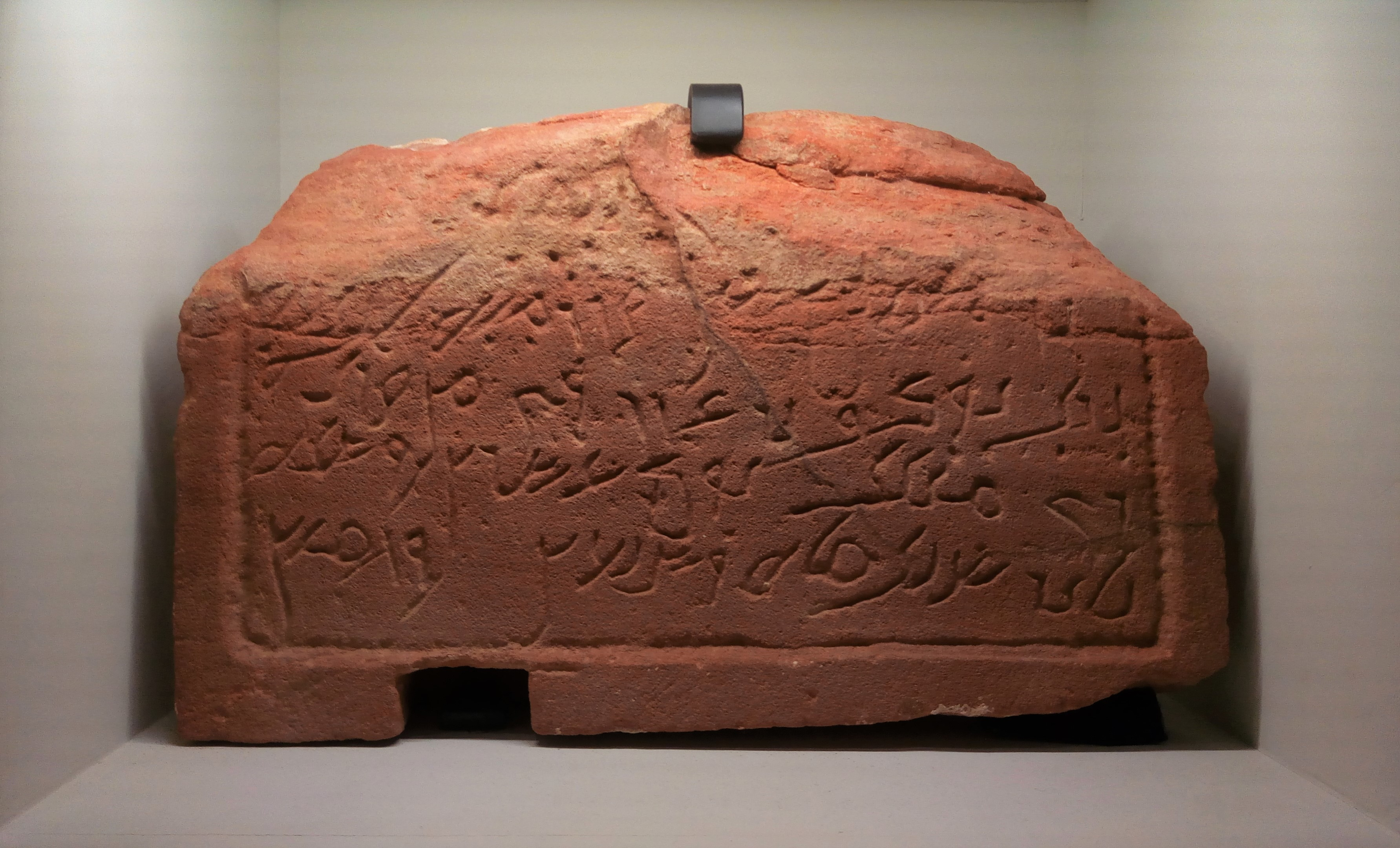
Funerary inscription in Nabataeo-Arabic script from Al-'Ula, 280 CE

A growing corpus of inscriptions are now known from a script that existed in a transitional phase between recognizable Arabic and Nabataean Aramaic. This script has been called Nabataean Arabic and is known from Northwestern Arabia. It provides further lexical and some morphological material for the later stages of Old Arabic in this region. The texts provide important insights as to the development of the Arabic script from its Nabataean forebear and are an important glimpse of the Old Hijazi dialects.

==== Paleo-Arabic ====
Several inscriptions in the fully evolved Arabic script, known as Paleo-Arabic, are now known from the pre-Islamic period. The earliest one is known as the Zabad inscription (528 CE) and was discovered in Syria. Another two prominent Paleo-Arabic Syrian inscriptions include the Jebel Usays inscription (528 CE) and the Harran inscription (568 CE).

== See also ==
- Semitic languages
- Arabic language
- Varieties of Arabic
