= Old North Arabian (Unicode block) =

- Range: U+10A80..U+10A9F (32 code points)
- Plane: SMP
- Scripts: Old North Arabian
- Major alphabets: Ancient North Arabian
- Assigned: 32 code points
- Unused: 0 reserved code points

Unicode Version History
- 7.0 (2014): 32 (+32)

Unicode documentation
- Code chart ∣ Web page

Old North Arabian is a Unicode block containing characters for writing the Ancient North Arabian languages.

U+10A9D OLD NORTH ARABIAN NUMBER ONE (𐪝) represents both the numeral one and a word divider.

Old North Arabian^{[1]} Official Unicode Consortium code chart (PDF)
	0	1	2	3	4	5	6	7	8	9	A	B	C	D	E	F
U+10A8x	𐪀	𐪁	𐪂	𐪃	𐪄	𐪅	𐪆	𐪇	𐪈	𐪉	𐪊	𐪋	𐪌	𐪍	𐪎	𐪏
U+10A9x	𐪐	𐪑	𐪒	𐪓	𐪔	𐪕	𐪖	𐪗	𐪘	𐪙	𐪚	𐪛	𐪜	𐪝	𐪞	𐪟
Notes 1.As of Unicode version 18.0

== History ==
The following Unicode-related documents record the purpose and process of defining specific characters in the Old North Arabian block:

Version	Final code points (Note: Proposed code points and characters names may differ from final code points and names)	Count	L2 ID	WG2 ID	Document
7.0	U+10A80..10A9F	32	L2/10-074R	N3773R	Everson, Michael (2010-03-30), Preliminary proposal to encode the Old North Arabian script in the SMP of the UCS
7.0	U+10A80..10A9F	32	L2/10-108		Moore, Lisa (2010-05-19), "C.19", UTC #123 / L2 #220 Minutes
7.0	U+10A80..10A9F	32	L2/10-376	N3937	Everson, Michael; Macdonald, M. C. A. (2010-10-11), Proposal to encode the Old North Arabian script in the SMP
7.0	U+10A80..10A9F	32		N3903 (pdf, doc)	"M57.19", Unconfirmed minutes of WG2 meeting 57, 2011-03-31
