= Ancient North Arabian =

Collection of scripts and possibly a language

- Script type: Abjad
- Period: 8th century BCE to 4th century CE
- Languages: Dadanitic, Taymanitic, Dumaitic, Thamudic, Safaitic, Hismaic

Related scripts
- Parent systems: Proto-Sinaitic script: South Semitic script; Ancient North Arabian
- Sister systems: Ancient South Arabian

ISO 15924
- ISO 15924: Narb (106), Old North Arabian (Ancient North Arabian)

Unicode
- Unicode alias: Old North Arabian
- Unicode range: U+10A80–U+10A9F

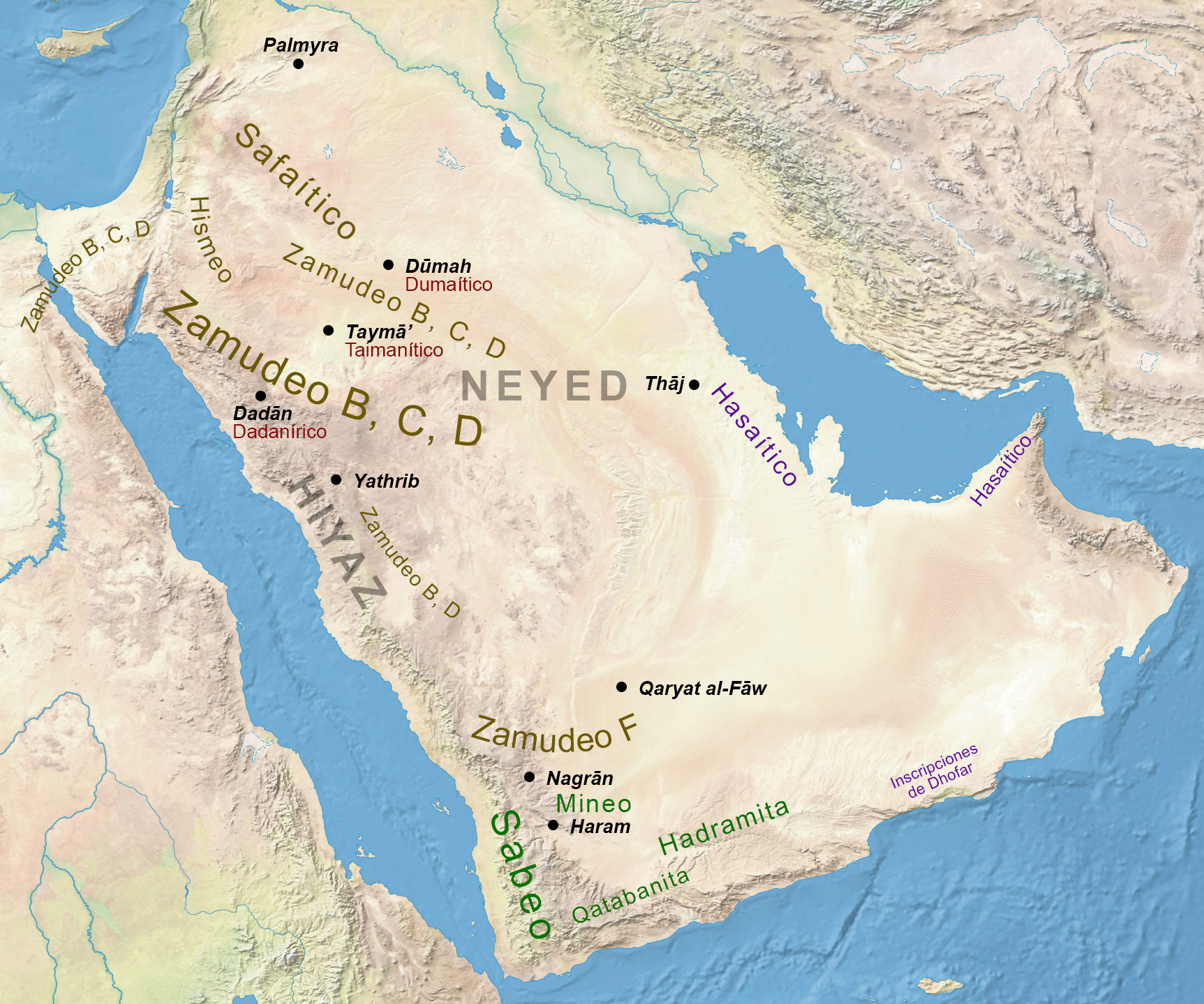
Languages and scripts in 1st century Arabia

Ancient North Arabian (ANA) is a collection of scripts and a language or family of languages under the North Arabian languages branch along with Old Arabic that were used in north and central Arabia and south Syria from the 8th century BCE to the 4th century CE. The term "Ancient North Arabian" is defined negatively. It refers to all of the South Semitic scripts except Ancient South Arabian (ASA) regardless of their genetic relationships.

== Classification ==
Many scholars believed that the various ANA alphabets were derived from the ASA script, mainly because the latter was employed by a major civilization and exhibited more angular features. Others believed that the ANA and ASA scripts shared a common ancestor from which they both developed in parallel. Indeed, it seems unlikely that the various ANA scripts descend from the monumental ASA alphabet, but that they collectively share a common ancestor to the exclusion of ASA is also something which has yet to be demonstrated.

The hypothesis that all ANA alphabets derive from a single ancestor gave rise to the idea that the languages which these scripts express constitute a linguistic unity, a so-called ANA language. As a hypothetical language or group of languages, Ancient North Arabian forms one branch of the North Arabian group, the other being Proto-Arabic. They are distinguished from each other by the definite article, which in Arabic is ʾal-, but in ANA is h-. They belong to a different branch of the Semitic languages than the Ancient South Arabian languages.

The validity of this hypothesis has been called into question. This is particularly the case for Taymanitic, which has been determined to be a Northwest Semitic language. Safaitic and Hismaic are also now considered forms of Old Arabic due to shared features.

== Geographical distribution ==
The Ancient North Arabian scripts were used both in the oases (Dadanitic, Dumaitic, Taymanitic) and by the nomads (Hismaic, Safaitic, Thamudic B, C, D, and possibly Southern Thamudic aka Thamudic F) of central and northern Arabia. The most ancient examples of the script discovered date back to the 9th–8th centuries BCE and were found in Syria, Israel, Mesopotamia, and Luristan.

== Table of letters ==
Ancient North Arabian script has a one-to-one correspondence with the Arabic alphabet except for 𐪏 and 𐪊 which correspond to س.

Ancient North Arabian Letter	Phoneme	IPA	Corresponding letter in		
Ancient North Arabian Letter	Phoneme	IPA	Ancient South Arabian	Arabic	Phoenician
𐪀	h	[h]	𐩠	ه	𐤄
𐪁	l	[l]	𐩡	ل	𐤋
𐪂	ḥ	[ħ]	𐩢	ح	𐤇
𐪍	ḫ	[x]	𐩭	خ	𐤇
𐪃	m	[m]	𐩣	م	𐤌
𐪄	q	[q]	𐩤	ق	𐤒
𐪅	w	[w], [uː]	𐩥	و	𐤅
𐪛	ṯ	[θ]	𐩻	ث	𐤔
𐪆	s² (ś)	[ɬ]	𐩦	ش	𐤔
𐪊	s¹ (š)	[ʃ]	𐩪	س	𐤔
𐪏	s³ (s)	[s]	𐩯	س	𐤎
𐪇	r	[r]	𐩧	ر	𐤓
𐪈	b	[b]	𐩨	ب	𐤁
𐪉	t	[t]	𐩩	ت	𐤕
𐪋	k	[k]	𐩫	ك	𐤊
𐪌	n	[n]	𐩬	ن	𐤍
𐪜	ẓ	[θˤ]	𐩼	ظ	𐤑
𐪎	ṣ	[sˤ]	𐩮	ص	𐤑
𐪓	ḍ	[dˤ]	𐩳	ض	𐤑
𐪐	f	[f]	𐩰	ف	𐤐
𐪑	ʾ	[ʔ]	𐩱	ا	𐤀
𐪒	ʿ	[ʕ]	𐩲	ع	𐤏
𐪖	ġ	[ɣ]	𐩶	غ	𐤏
𐪔	g	[g]	𐩴	ج	𐤂
𐪕	d	[d]	𐩵	د	𐤃
𐪗	ṭ	[tˤ]	𐩷	ط	𐤈
𐪘	z	[z]	𐩸	ز	𐤆
𐪙	ḏ	[ð]	𐩹	ذ	𐤆
𐪚	y	[j], [iː]	𐩺	ي	𐤉

== Unicode ==
Old North Arabian script was added to the Unicode Standard in June 2014 with the release of version 7.0.

The Unicode block for Ancient North Arabian is U+10A80–U+10A9F:

Old North Arabian^{[1]} Official Unicode Consortium code chart (PDF)
	0	1	2	3	4	5	6	7	8	9	A	B	C	D	E	F
U+10A8x	𐪀	𐪁	𐪂	𐪃	𐪄	𐪅	𐪆	𐪇	𐪈	𐪉	𐪊	𐪋	𐪌	𐪍	𐪎	𐪏
U+10A9x	𐪐	𐪑	𐪒	𐪓	𐪔	𐪕	𐪖	𐪗	𐪘	𐪙	𐪚	𐪛	𐪜	𐪝	𐪞	𐪟
Notes 1.As of Unicode version 18.0

== See also ==
- Nabataean script

== Literature ==
- Lozachmeur, H., (ed.), (1995) Presence arabe dans le croissant fertile avant l'Hegire (Actes de la table ronde internationale Paris, 13 novembre 1993) Paris: Éditions Recherche sur les Civilisations. ISBN 2-86538-254-0
- Macdonald, M.C.A., (2000) "Reflections on the linguistic map of pre-Islamic Arabia" Arabian Archaeology and Epigraphy 11(1), 28–79
- Scagliarini, F., (1999) "The Dedanitic inscriptions from Jabal 'Ikma in north-western Hejaz" Proceedings of the Seminar for Arabian Studies 29, 143-150 ISBN 2-503-50829-4
- Winnett, F.V. and Reed, W.L., (1970) Ancient Records from North Arabia (Toronto: University of Toronto)
- Woodard, Roger D. Ancient Languages of Syria-Palestine and Arabia. Cambridge University Press 2008.
