= Taymanitic =

Extinct Central Semitic language of northwest Arabia

- Region: Taymāʾ
- Era: second half of the 6th century BC
- Language family: Afroasiatic: Semitic; West Semitic; Central Semitic; Northwest Semitic?; Taymanitic
- Writing system: Ancient North Arabian

Language codes
- ISO 639-3: None (mis)
- Glottolog: taym1240

Taymanitic was the language and script of the oasis of Taymāʾ in northwestern Arabia, dated to the second half of the 6th century BC.

== Classification ==
Taymanitic does not participate in the key innovations of Proto-Arabic, precluding it from being considered a member of the Arabic language family. It shares one key isogloss with Northwest Semitic: the change w > y in word-initial position. Examples include yrḫ for *warḫum 'moon, month' and ydʿ for wadaʿa 'to know'.

It is clear that Taymanitic script expressed a distinct linguistic variety that is not Arabic and not closely related to Hismaic or Safaitic, while it can tentatively be suggested that it was more closely related to Northwest Semitic.

== Phonology ==
=== Consonants ===
Consonant phonemes
		Bilabial	Alveolar			Palatal	Velar	Pharyn- geal	Glottal
		Bilabial	plain	sibilant	lateral	Palatal	Velar	Pharyn- geal	Glottal
Nasal		m	n						
Plosive/ Affricate	voiceless	p	t	ts			k		ʔ
Plosive/ Affricate	voiced	b	d	dz			ɡ		ʔ
Plosive/ Affricate	ejective		tʼ	tsʼ	tɬʼ		kʼ		ʔ
Fricative	voiceless			s	ɬ		x	ħ	h
Fricative	voiced						ɣ	ʕ	
Liquid	trill		r						
Liquid	central				l				
Semivowel						j	w		

=== Vowels ===
Monophthong phonemes
	Short		Long	
	Front	Back	Front	Back
Close	i	u	iː	uː
Open	a		aː	

There were two diphthongs of a vowel and semivowel: /aj/ and /aw/.

== Characteristics ==
Taymanitic exhibits two major features which are innovative:

1. The change w > y in word-initial position: yrḫ for *warḫum 'moon, month' and ydʿ for wadaʿa 'to know'.
2. The mergers *z, *ḏ > *z; *s, *ṯ > *s; and *ṣ, *ṯ̣ > *ṣ (loss of interdentals).

Unlike Arabic, Taymanitic does not exhibit the merger of Proto-Semitic [s] and [ts].
