= Nabataean script =

Script used by the Nabataeans from the second century BC onwards

- Script type: Abjad
- Period: 2nd century BC to 4th century AD
- Direction: Right-to-left script
- Languages: Nabataean Aramaic; Nabataean Arabic

Related scripts
- Parent systems: Egyptian hieroglyphs: Proto-Sinaitic script; Phoenician alphabet; Aramaic alphabet; Nabataean script
- Child systems: Arabic script

ISO 15924
- ISO 15924: Nbat (159), Nabataean

Unicode
- Unicode alias: Nabataean
- Unicode range: U+10880–U+108AF; Final Accepted Script Proposal

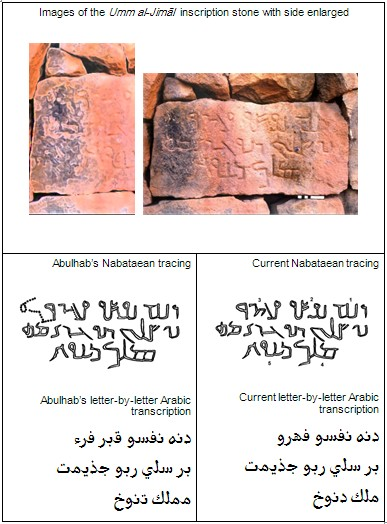
Nabataean Arabic inscription from Umm al-Jimal in northern Jordan

The Nabataean script is an abjad (consonantal alphabet) that was used to write Nabataean Aramaic and Nabataean Arabic from the second century BC onwards. Important inscriptions are found in Petra (in Jordan), the Sinai Peninsula (now part of Egypt), Bosra and Namara (in Syria), and other archaeological sites including Abdah (in Israel) and Mada'in Saleh (Hegra) (in Saudi Arabia).

Nabataean is only known through inscriptions and, more recently, a small number of papyri. It was first deciphered in 1840 by Eduard Friedrich Ferdinand Beer. 6,000 – 7,000 Nabataean inscriptions have been published, of which more than 95% are mostly short inscriptions or graffiti, and the vast majority are undated, post-Nabataean or from outside the core Nabataean territory. A majority of inscriptions considered Nabataean were found in Sinai, and another 4,000 – 7,000 such Sinaitic inscriptions remain unpublished. Prior to the publication of Nabataean papyri, the only substantial corpus of detailed Nabataean text were the 38 funerary inscriptions from Mada'in Salih (Hegra), discovered and published by Charles Montagu Doughty, Charles Huber, Philippe Berger and Julius Euting in 1884-85.

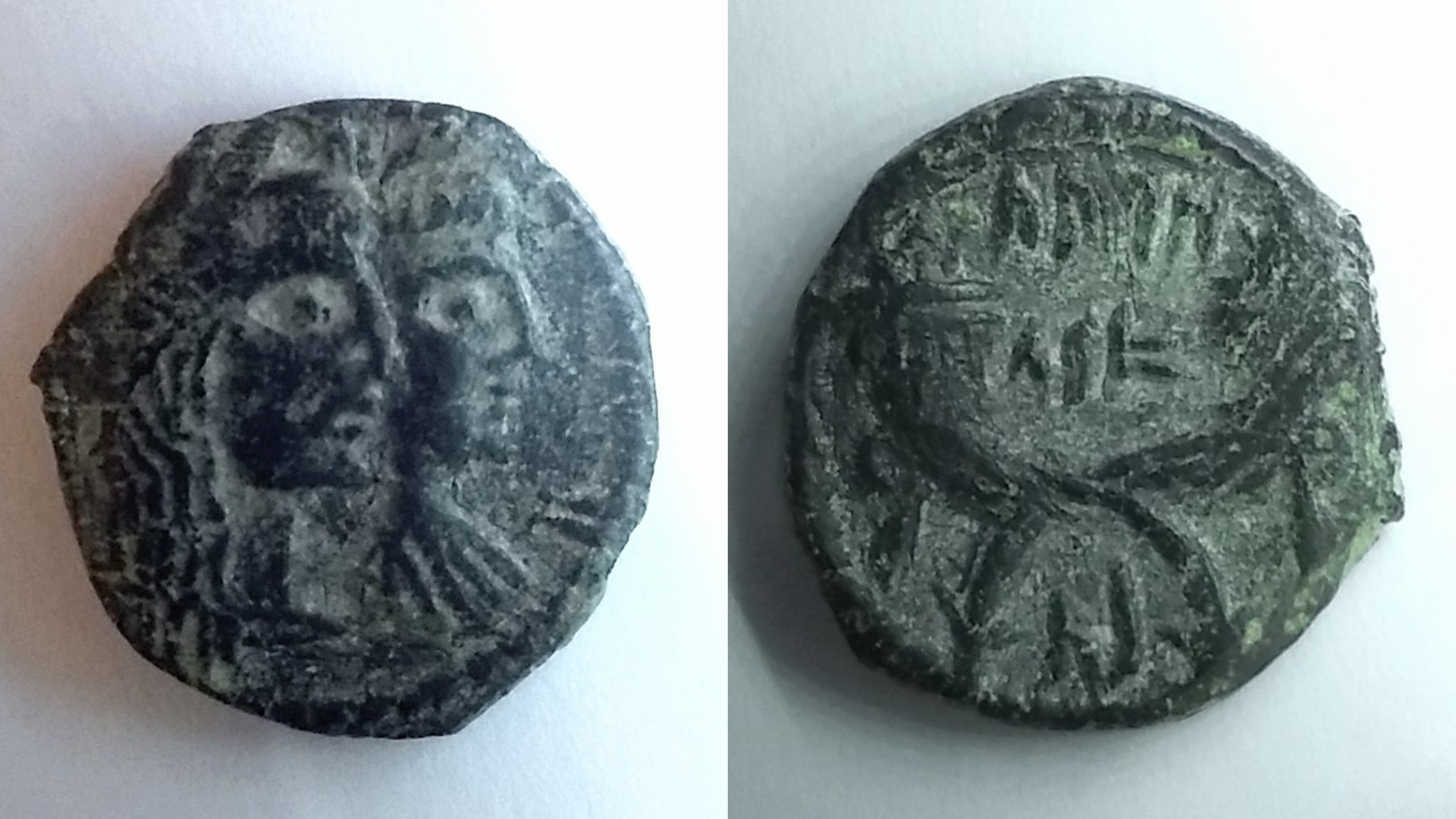
Nabataean Kingdom, Aretas IV and Shaqilath, 9 BC – 40 AD, AE18. On the reverse, an example of Nabataean script: names of Aretas IV (1st line) and Shaqilath (2nd and 3rd line).

== History ==
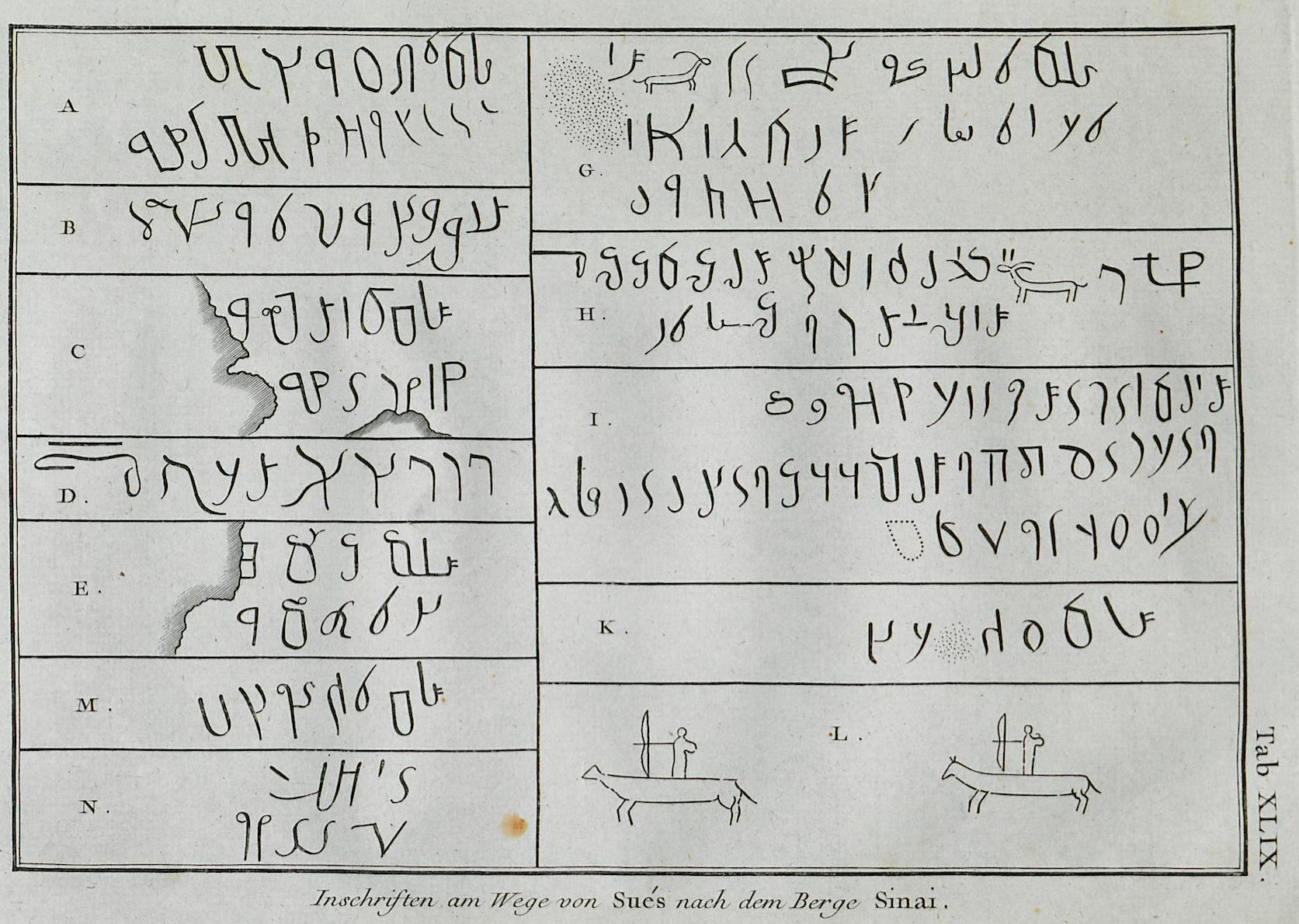
Sinaitic (Nabataean) inscriptions published in 1774 by Carsten Niebuhr

The alphabet is descended from the Aramaic alphabet. In turn, a cursive form of Nabataean developed into the Arabic alphabet from the 4th century, which is why Nabataean's letterforms are intermediate between the more northerly Semitic scripts (such as the Aramaic-derived Hebrew) and those of Arabic.

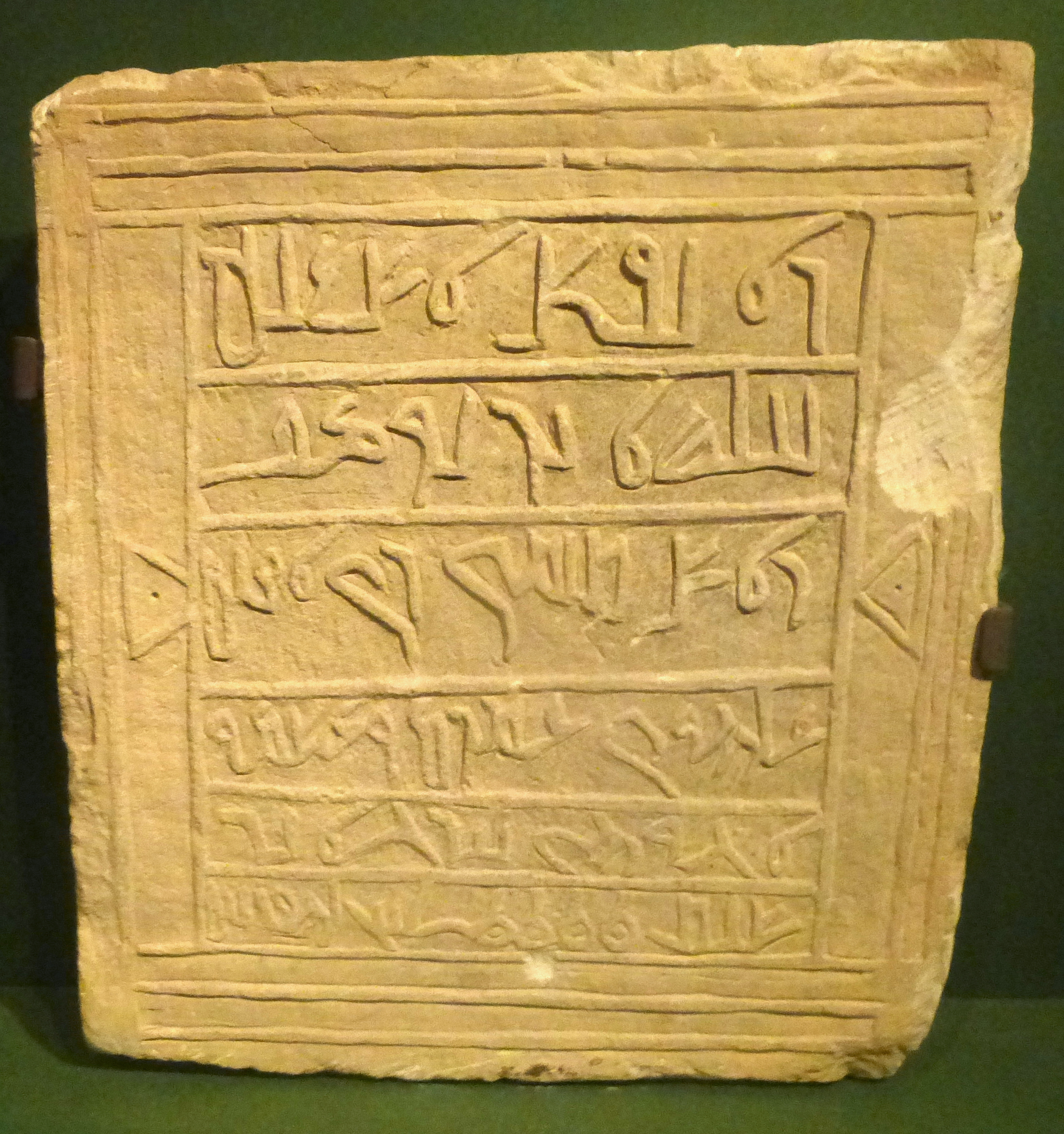
Inscription in the Nabataean script.

=== Comparison with related scripts ===
As compared to other Aramaic-derived scripts, Nabataean developed more loops and ligatures, likely to increase speed of writing. The ligatures seem to have not been standardized and varied across places and time. There were no spaces between words. Numerals in Nabataean script were built from characters of 1, 2, 3, 4, 5, 10, 20, and 100.

Name	Phoenician	Phoneme	Aramaic	Nabataean		Syriac	Hebrew	Arabic	Phoneme
ʾālep	𐤀	ʾ [ʔ]	𐡀	𐢀 (final)	𐢁	ܐ	א	ﺍ	ʾ [ʔ]
bēt	𐤁	b [b]	𐡁	𐢂 (final)	𐢃	ܒ	ב	ﺏ	b [b]
gīml	𐤂	g [ɡ]	𐡂	𐢄		ܓ	ג	ﺝ	j [d͡ʒ]
dālet	𐤃	d [d]	𐡃	𐢅		ܕ	ד	د	d [d]
dālet	𐤃	d [d]	𐡃	𐢅		ܕ	ד	ذ	ḏ [ð]
he	𐤄	h [h]	𐡄	𐢆 (final)	𐢇	ܗ	ה	ه	h [h]
wāw	𐤅	w [w]	𐡅	𐢈		ܘ	ו	ﻭ	w [w]
zayin	𐤆	z [z]	𐡆	𐢉		ܙ	ז	ﺯ	z [z]
ḥēt	𐤇	ḥ [ħ]	𐡇	𐢊		ܚ	ח	ح	ḥ [ħ]
ḥēt	𐤇	ḥ [ħ]	𐡇	𐢊		ܚ	ח	خ	ḵ [x]
ṭēt	𐤈	ṭ [tˤ]	𐡈	𐢋		ܛ	ט	ط	ṭ [tˤ]
ṭēt	𐤈	ṭ [tˤ]	𐡈	𐢋		ܛ	ט	ظ	ẓ [ðˤ]
yod	𐤉	y [j]	𐡉	𐢌 (final)	𐢍	ܝ	י	ي	y [j]
kāp	𐤊	k [k]	𐡊	𐢎 (final)	𐢏	ܟ	כ ,ך	ﻙ	k [k]
lāmed	𐤋	l [l]	𐡋	𐢐 (final)	𐢑	ܠ	ל	ﻝ	l [l]
mēm	𐤌	m [m]	𐡌	𐢒 (final)	𐢓	ܡ	מ ,ם	ﻡ	m [m]
nūn	𐤍	n [n]	𐡍	𐢔 (final)	𐢕	ܢ	נ ,ן	ﻥ	n [n]
śāmek	𐤎	ś [s]	𐡎	𐢖		ܣ	ס	س	s [s]
ʿayin	𐤏	ʿ [ʕ]	𐡏	𐢗		ܥ	ע	ع	ʿ [ʕ]
ʿayin	𐤏	ʿ [ʕ]	𐡏	𐢗		ܥ	ע	غ	ḡ [ɣ]
pē	𐤐	p [p]	𐡐	𐢘		ܦ	פ ,ף	ف	f [f]
ṣādē	𐤑	ṣ [sˤ]	𐡑	𐢙		ܨ	צ ,ץ	ص	ṣ [sˤ]
ṣādē	𐤑	ṣ [sˤ]	𐡑	𐢙		ܨ	צ ,ץ	ض	ḍ [dˤ]
qōp	𐤒	q [q]	𐡒	𐢚		ܩ	ק	ﻕ	q [q]
rēs, reš	𐤓	r [r]	𐡓	𐢛		ܪ	ר	ﺭ	r [r]
šīn	𐤔	š [ʃ]	𐡔	𐢜 (final)	𐢝	ܫ	ש	ش	š [ʃ]
tāw	𐤕	t [t]	𐡕	𐢞		ܬ	ת	ت	t [t]
tāw	𐤕	t [t]	𐡕	𐢞		ܬ	ת	ث	ṯ [θ]

== Corpora of inscriptions in Nabataean script ==
- Julius Euting, Nabatäische Inschriften aus Arabien, Berlin, 1885 (online; plates available here).
- Euting, Julius (1891). Sinaïtische Inschriften (in German). G. Reimer. ISBN 978-3-11-108880-8.
- Corpus Inscriptionum Semiticarum, 1902 Pars 2, Tomus 1, Fasc 3: Inscriptiones Aramaicae
- Michael E. Stone, 1992. Rock Inscriptions and Graffiti Project: Catalogue of Inscriptions
- Roche, Marie-Jeanne (2019). Inscriptions nabatéennes datées de la fin du IIe siècle avant notre ère au milieu du IVe siècle (in French). Leuven. ISBN 978-90-429-3882-3. OCLC 1229107538.
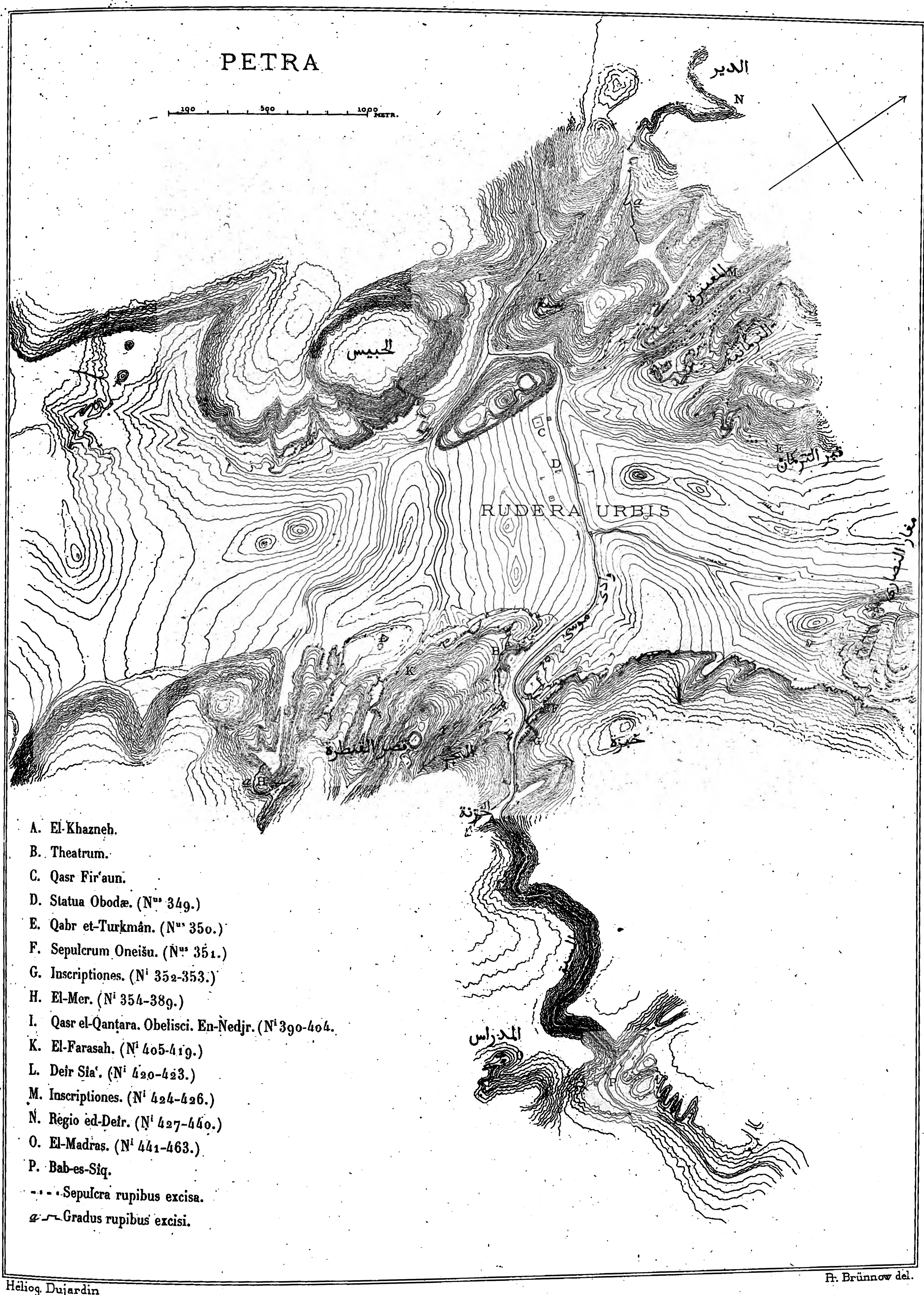
Petra inscriptions as of 1902

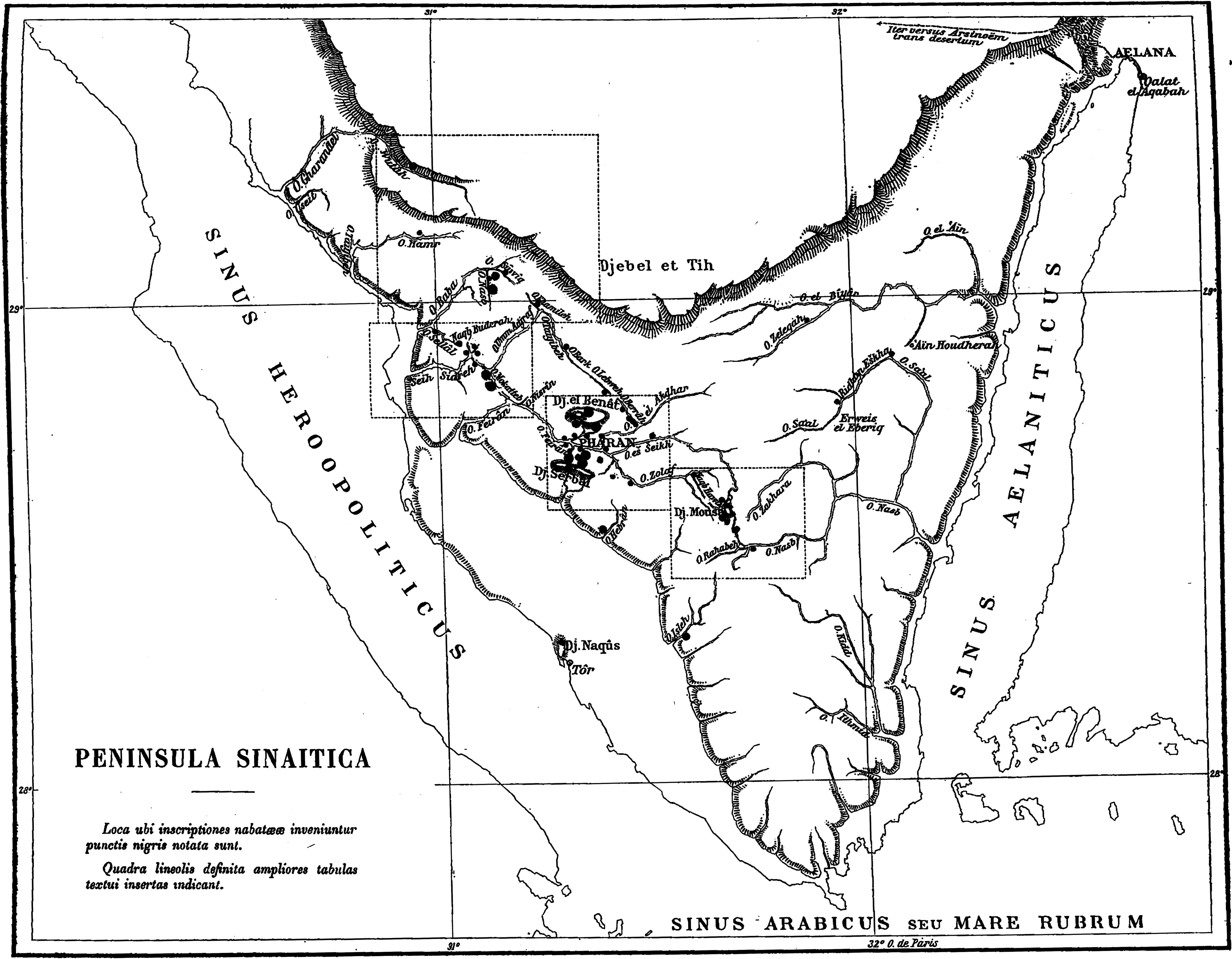
Sinai Peninsula inscriptions as of 1902

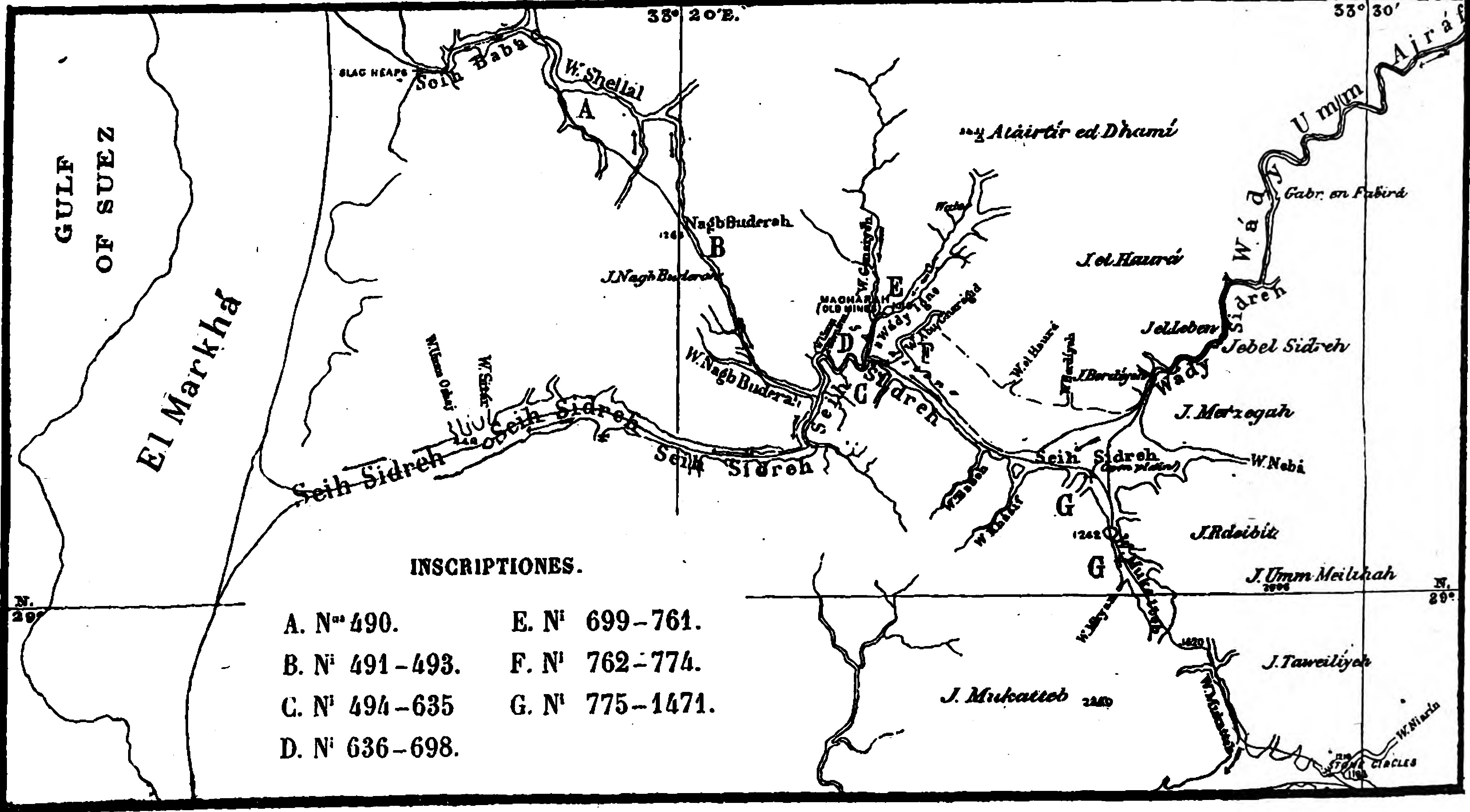
Wadi Mukattab inscriptions as of 1902

== Unicode ==
The Nabataean alphabet (U+10880–U+108AF) was added to the Unicode Standard in June 2014 with the release of version 7.0.

Nabataean^{[1]}^{[2]} Official Unicode Consortium code chart (PDF)
	0	1	2	3	4	5	6	7	8	9	A	B	C	D	E	F
U+1088x	𐢀	𐢁	𐢂	𐢃	𐢄	𐢅	𐢆	𐢇	𐢈	𐢉	𐢊	𐢋	𐢌	𐢍	𐢎	𐢏
U+1089x	𐢐	𐢑	𐢒	𐢓	𐢔	𐢕	𐢖	𐢗	𐢘	𐢙	𐢚	𐢛	𐢜	𐢝	𐢞	
U+108Ax								𐢧	𐢨	𐢩	𐢪	𐢫	𐢬	𐢭	𐢮	𐢯
Notes 1.As of Unicode version 17.0 2.Grey areas indicate non-assigned code points

== See also ==
- Ancient North Arabian script
- Ancient South Arabian script
- Nabataean Aramaic
- Nabataean Arabic
