= Safaitic =

Script variant for Old Arabic

- Script type: Abjad
- Period: 3rd century BCE to 4th century CE
- Languages: Old Arabic

Related scripts
- Parent systems: Proto-Sinaitic script: South Semitic script; Safaitic
- Sister systems: Ancient North Arabian, Ancient South Arabian script, Ge'ez script

Safaitic (Arabic: ٱلصَّفَائِيَّة Al-Ṣafāʾiyyah) is a variety of the South Semitic scripts that was used by the Arabs in southern Syria and northern Jordan in the Ḥarrah region, to carve rock inscriptions in various dialects of Old Arabic and Ancient North Arabian. The Safaitic script is a member of the Ancient North Arabian (ANA) sub-grouping of the South Semitic script family, the genetic unity of which has yet to be demonstrated.

The first attempt at a comprehensive Safaitic dictionary was published in 2019 by Ahmad Al-Jallad and Karolina Jaworska.

The first Safaitic inscription was identified in the region Safa, southeast of Damascus within the Harrah. The script was named after this location.

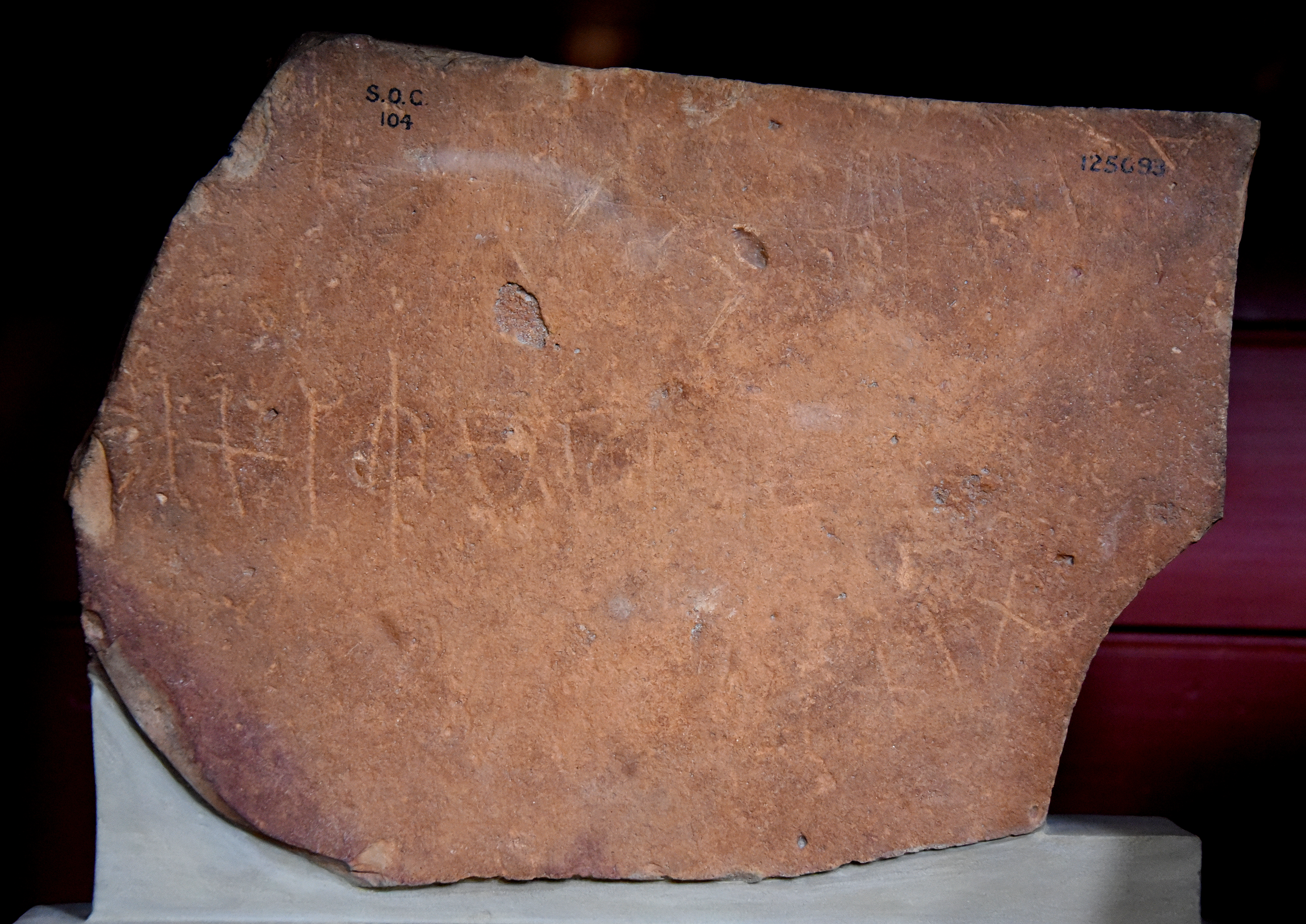
Safaitic script with a figure of a camel on a red sandstone fragment, from es-Safa, currently housed in the British Museum

== Geographical distribution ==
Safaitic inscriptions are named after the area where they were first discovered in 1857: As-Safa, a region of basalt desert to the southeast of Damascus, Syria. Since then they have been found over a wide area including south Syria, eastern Jordan and northwestern Saudi Arabia. Isolated examples occur further afield in places such as Palmyra in Syria, in Wadi Hauran in western Iraq, and in Ha'il in north central Saudi Arabia. Remarkably, nine groups of graffiti were discovered in 1987 on the walls of the theatre corridor in the ancient Roman city of Pompeii, Italy. One explanation is that they were written by nomads incorporated into the Roman army who travelled to Italy with Legio III Gallica during the civil unrest of 69 AD to install Vespasian as emperor.

The largest concentration appears to be in the Harrat al-Shamah, a black basalt desert, stretching south and east from Jabal al-Druze in south Syria through Jordan and into Saudi Arabia. Approximately 30,000 inscriptions have been recorded, although doubtless many hundreds of thousands more remain undiscovered due to the remoteness and inhospitable nature of the terrain in which they are found. Typically the inscriptions are found on the rocks and boulders of the desert scatter, or on the stones of cairns. In many cases it is unclear whether the inscriptions on the cairns pre- or post-date the construction of the cairns.

== Alphabetical order ==
The Safaitic alphabet comprises 28 letters. Several abecedaries (lists of letters of the alphabet) are known, but all are written in various orders. In 2026, Hugo Cartwright showed that these orders may have had links with others such as the oldest ones yet found (Ugarit) and may also be linked to language frequencies such as that of Amorite or yet still cuneiform traditions.

== Script ==
The Safaitic script exhibits considerable variability in letter shapes and writing styles. The inscriptions can be written in nearly any direction and there are no word dividers. There are two primary variants of the script: normal and square. The normal variant exhibits a large degree of variation, depending on the hand of individual authors and writing instrument. The square script appears to be a deliberate stylistic variant, making use of more angular forms of the letters. Inscriptions rarely employ the square variants consistently, but mix these shapes with normal letter forms. Finally, a minority of inscriptions exhibit a mix of Safaitic and Hismaic letter shapes.

=== Letters ===
Letter		Name	Pronunciation (IPA)	Classical Arabic transcription (Modern Arabic form)	Latin transcription		
Normal	Square	Name	Pronunciation (IPA)	Classical Arabic transcription (Modern Arabic form)	OCIANA	Winnett & Harding	SSHB
		alif	[ʔ]	ا، ى، و) أ، إ، ئ، ؤ)	ʾ		
		ayn	[ʕ]	ع) ع)	ʿ		
		ba	[b]	ٮ) ب)	b		
		dal	[d]	د) د)	d		
		dhal	[ð]	د) ذ)	ḏ		
		Ḍād	[dˤ]	ص) ض)	ḍ		
		fa		ڡ) ف)	f		
		gim	[g]	ح) ج)	g		
		ghayn	[ɣ]	ع) غ)	ġ		
		ha	[h]	ه) ه)	h		
		hha	[ħ]	ح) ح)	ḥ		
		kha	[x]	ح) خ)	ẖ		
		kaf	[kʰ]	ک) ك)	k		
		lam	[l]	ل) ل)	l		
		mim	[m]	م) م)	m		
		nun	[n]	ں) ن)	n		
		qaf	[q]	ٯ) ق)	q		
		ra	[r]	ر) ر)	r		
		sin		س) س)	s¹	s	
		shin	[ɬ]	س) ش)	s²	š	ś
		sad	[s]	ص) ص)	ṣ	s	
		ta	[tʰ]	ٮ) ت)	t		
		tha	[θ]	ٮ) ث)	ṯ		
		tta		ط) ط)	ṭ		
		waw	[w]	و) و)	w		
		ya	[j]	ى) ي)	y		
		zayn	[z]	ر) ز)	z		
		za		ط) ظ)	ẓ		

== Language ==
Safaitic
- Safa'itic
- Region: Syria
- Era: 3rd century BCE to 4th century CE
- Language family: Afroasiatic: Semitic; West Semitic; Central Semitic; North Arabian?; Arabic; Old Arabic; Safaitic
- Writing system: Safaitic

Language codes
- ISO 639-3: None (mis)
- Glottolog: safa1245

The traditional view held that because the Safaitic inscriptions often make use of the definite article ha-, in contrast to Classical Arabic 'al, that their language should not be regarded as Arabic proper, but rather as Ancient North Arabian. However, as more inscriptions have come to light, it is clear that the Safaitic dialects make use of a variety of definite article forms, including 'al, and even a simple 'a-. Based on this fact, the competing view holds that the dialects attested in the Safaitic script represent a linguistic continuum, on which Classical Arabic and other older forms of the language lie.

== Content ==
Most Safaitic inscriptions are graffito that reflect the current concerns of the author: the availability of grazing for his camel herd, mourning the discovery of another inscription by a person who has since died, or simply listing his genealogy and stating that he made the inscription. Others comment on raids and pray for booty, or mention religious practices. A few inscriptions by female authors are known. Inscriptions are sometimes accompanied by rock art, showing hunting or battle scenes, camels and horses and their riders, Bedouin camp scenes, or occasional female figures.
