= Palmyrene =

Palmyrene may refer to:

- an inhabitant of ancient Palmyra, Syria
- Palmyrene Aramaic, a dialect of Aramaic
- Palmyrene alphabet
- Palmyrene inscriptions, the known writing
- Palmyrena, the historical region of Palmyra
- Palmyrene Empire, a short-lived state
- Palmyrene (Unicode block)
