= Names of the Levant =

Over recorded history, there have been many names of the Levant, a large area in the Near East, or its constituent parts. These names have applied to a part or the whole of the Levant. On occasion, two or more of these names have been used at the same time by different cultures or sects. As a natural result, some of the names of the Levant are highly politically charged. Perhaps the least politicized name is Levant itself, which simply means "where the sun rises" or "where the land rises out of the sea", a meaning attributed to the region's easterly location on the shore of the Mediterranean Sea.

== Antiquity ==
=== Retjenu ===
Ancient Egyptian texts (c. 14th century BC) called the entire coastal area along the Mediterranean Sea between modern Egypt and Turkey rṯnw (conventionally Reṯenu). In the Amarna letters, written in Akkadian cuneiform, Reṯenu is subdivided into five regions:

- kꜣnꜥnꜥ (Kanana), i.e. Canaan proper (Idumea, Judea, Samaria);
  - pꜣ-kꜣnꜥnꜥ (pa-Kanana), city of Gaza; name used in reference to being the administrative centre of Canaan.
- Ḏahy (ḏꜣhy;Ṯahi, Ḏahi), roughly Galilee and coastal plain to Ashkelon dominated by Hazor;
- Rmnn, coast of Lebanon;
- Amurru, (the Amurru kingdom of the Amorites);
- Kharu (ḥꜣrw), the chief city of which was Ugarit.

=== Canaan ===
- Akkadian: 𒆳𒆠𒈾𒄴𒈾 (Kinaḫnu)
- Arabic: کَنْعَان [kanʕaːn]
- Phoenician: 𐤊𐤍𐤏𐤍 (Knʿn)
- Greek: Χαναάν or Χνᾶ (Khanaán or Khna)
- Hebrew

- Israeli Hebrew: כְּנַעַן [knaʔan]
- Tiberian Hebrew: כְּנַעַן [kənaʕan]

- Latin: Canaan
- Persian: کنعان (Kænaan)
- Ugaritic: 𐎋𐎐𐎓𐎐 (Knʿn)
- Turkish: Kenan

Prior to (and for some time after) the formation of the Israelite/Hebrew identity and polities in the region, the land was referred to natively as Canaan (first attested in Assyrian Akkadian as Kinaḫnu). The Phoenicians — also descended from the Bronze Age Canaanites, and close relatives and neighbors of the Israelites — likewise continued to speak a Canaanite language and practice Canaanite religion at their Mediterranean ports, and referred to themselves natively as "Canaanites", and their land as "Canaan".

=== Phoenicia ===
- Arabic: فِينِيقْيَة [fiː'niːqjæ(h)]
- Greek: Φοινίκη (Phoiníkē)
- Hebrew

- Israeli Hebrew: פיניקיה (Feniqiyah or Finiqiyah)

- Latin: Phœnicia
- Turkish: Fenike

In ancient times, the Greeks called the whole of Canaan Phoiníkē, literally "[land] of the purple[-producing shell]". Today, general consensus associates the Phoenician homeland proper with the Eastern Mediterranean coast, which includes coastal Syria, modern-day Lebanon, and Israel. Notable Phoenician cities include Tyre, Sidon, and Byblos. Also, there is a modern town in Turkey called Finike which is thought to have derived by the Lycians who traded with Phoenicians in ancient times.

=== Israel and Judea ===
Israel:

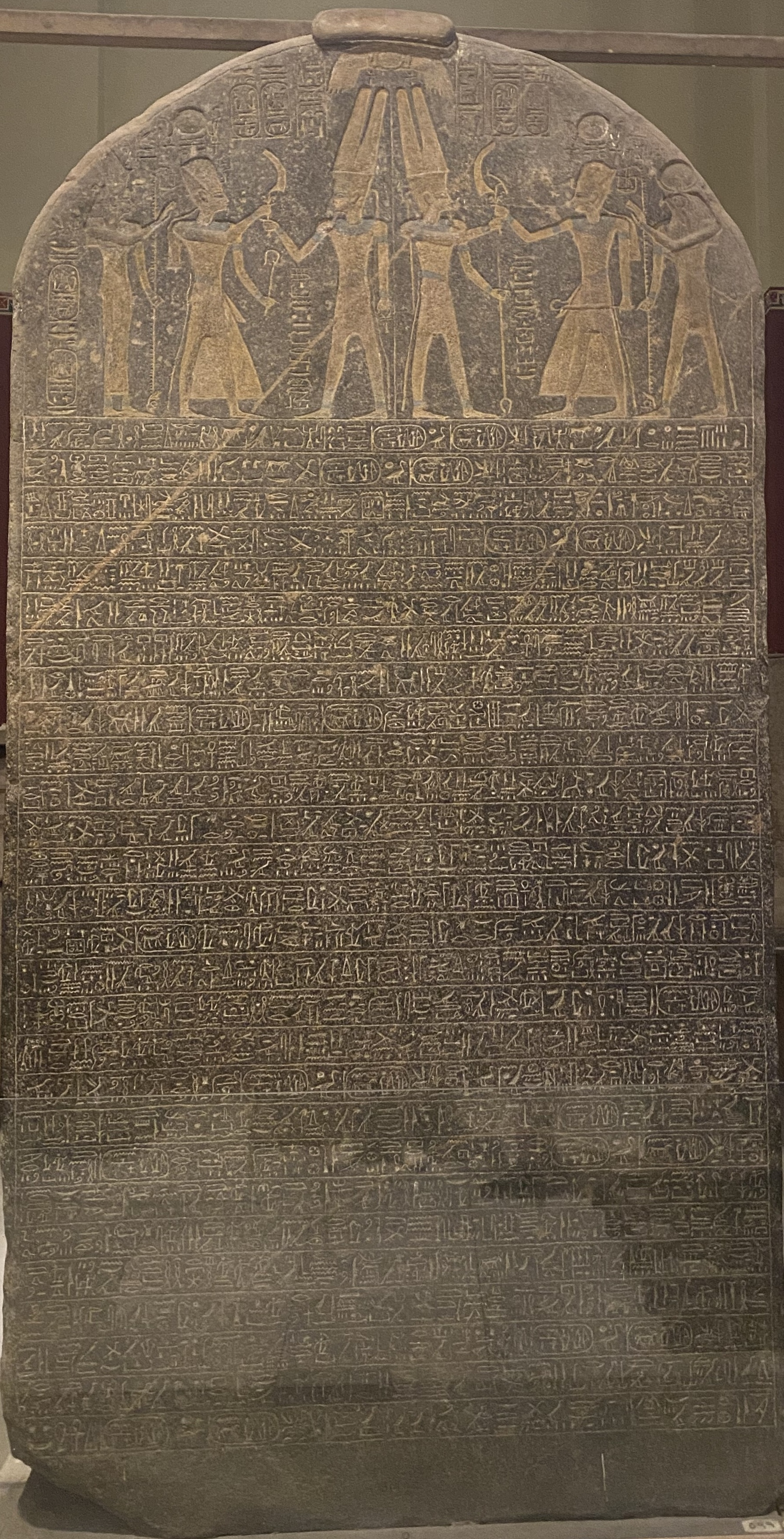
The Merneptah Stele (13th century BCE). The majority of biblical archeologists translate a set of hieroglyphs as Israel, the first instance of the name in the record.

- Egyptian: ysrỉꜣr (/iːsriɑr/)i i z Z1s Z1s r i A r Z1 T14 A1 B1 Z2
- Arabic: إِِِسْرَائِيْل [ʔisraːʔiːl]
- Canaanite: 𐤉𐤔𐤓𐤀𐤋 (yšrʾl)
- Greek: Ισραήλ (Israḗl)
- Hebrew

- Israeli Hebrew: ישראל (Yisrael)
- Tiberian Hebrew: יִשְׂרָאֵל [jisrɔˈʔeːl]
- Biblical Hebrew: 𐤉𐤔𐤓𐤀𐤋 [jɪɬɾaːˈʔeːl]

- Latin: Israël
- Turkish: İsrail
- Middle Persian: Adēr / Adēl
- Persian: اسراییل (Esrajil)

Judea:

- Arabic: یَهُوْدَا [jahuːdaː]
- Akkadian: 𒅀𒌑𒁕𒀀𒀀 (ia-u_{2}-da-a-a)
- Greek: Ἰουδαία (Ioudaía)
- Hebrew

- Israeli Hebrew: יהודה (Yehuda)
- Tiberian Hebrew: Yəhūḏā

- Persian: یهودیه (Jæhudije / Jæhudija)
- Turkish: Yahudi
- Latin: Judæa

The kingdoms of Israel and Judah were Iron Age Semitic nations spanning from Edom in the south to Aram in the north. Today, the modern State of Israel controls much of the former territory of the ancient Israelite/Judean kingdoms. According to the Deuteronomic history in the Bible, the polities of Israel and Judah originally split off from an earlier, united Kingdom of Israel, ruled by illustrious kings such as David and Solomon; though modern archaeology, biblical scholarship, and historians are generally somewhat skeptical of the historicity of the alleged united monarchy of Israel, suggesting instead that the two kingdoms developed separately, with the southern kingdom of Judah probably dependent on the northern kingdom of Israel as a satellite state at first.

The term Judaea is used by historians to refer to the Roman province that extended over parts of the former regions of the Hasmonean and Herodian kingdoms. It was named after Herod Archelaus's ethnarchy of Judea of which it was an expansion, the name being derived from the earlier provincial designations Yehud Medinata (Achaemenid) and Yehud (Neo-Babylonian): all ultimately referring to the former Hebrew kingdom of Judah.

=== Aram and Syria ===
The part of the Northern Levant located east of Phoenicia was originally called Aram. It was inhabited by the Arameans, who spoke Aramaic. During the late Iron Age, the neighboring Assyrians (from northern Mesopotamia) invaded Aram, gradually bringing it under the control of the Neo-Assyrian Empire. The Assyrians themselves originally spoke Akkadian (a Semitic language written in cuneiform) but over the course of their expansion, they adopted Aramaic as a lingua franca.

At the time of Achaemenid Persian rule of the Near East, the ancient Greek writers applied the name Syria (an apheretic form of Assyria) to Aram because it had been ruled by the Neo-Assyrian Empire, although its population was predominantly Aramean. Over time, Syria came to denote the broader Levant, while Assyria referred to Mesopotamia. Herodotus (5th century BCE) consistently distinguished the two.

After the time of Herodotus, some Greek and Roman writers occasionally blurred the distinction between Syria and Assyria. Nevertheless, educated writers and administrative usage gradually preserved the distinction, with Syria referring to the Levant and Assyria to Mesopotamia.

During the Syrian Wars between the Seleucid dynasty and the Ptolemaic dynasty (274–168 BC), the region was known in Greek as Κοίλη Συρία (Latin: Coele-Syria). The term appears first in Arrian's Anabasis of Alexander (2.13.7) in AD 145 and has been much discussed; although literally meaning “hollow Syria” in Greek, it is usually interpreted by historians as a transcription of Aramaic kul, "all, the entire", identifying all of Syria.

Afterwards Syria continued to designate the Levant, and various subregions were identified: for example, Syria Damascena (lit. 'Damascene Syria') or Syria Palmyrena (lit. 'Palmyrene Syria'). In 135 CE, after the Bar Kokhba revolt in Judea, Hadrian renamed Judea as Syria Palaestina (lit. 'Palestinian Syria, i.e. the Palestinian part of Syria') in order to punish the Jews by erasing the name “Judea”.

"Greater Syria" refers to a larger area that is supported by some nationalists.

=== Palestine ===
Palestine:

- Arabic: فِلِسْطِيْن [filistˤiːn]
- Greek: Παλαιστίνη (Palaistinē) - from Hebrew: פְּלִשְׁת [pəliːʃˈti] Philistia
- Hebrew

- Israeli Hebrew: פלשתינה (Palestina) – from Latin, English etc., or Israeli Hebrew: פלסטין (Falastin) – from Arabic.

- Persian: فلسطین (Felestin)
- Latin: Palæstina - same word as Philistia
- Turkish: Filistin

An early version of the name Palestine was first recorded by the ancient Egyptians as Peleset. Herodotus later called the whole area Syria Palaistinē in his Histories (c. 450 BC), and included the entire territory of ancient Israel and Judea (which he noted for the practice of circumcision), not specifically the coastal Philistine territory (whose people notably did not practice circumcision according to Bible). The Romans applied the term Syria Palaestina to the southern part of the region—beginning in AD 135, following the Bar Kokhba revolt—to complete the disassociation with the former identity of Judaea. The name continued to be used for the province throughout later Byzantine and Islamic rule.

Standard Hebrew has two names for Palestine, both of which are different from the Hebrew name for ancient Philistia. The first name Palestina was used by Hebrew speakers in the British Mandate of Palestine; it is spelled like the name for Philistia but with three more letters added to the end and a Latin pronunciation given. The second name Falastin is a direct loan from the Arabic form, and is used today specifically to refer to the modern Palestinians and to political aspirations for a Palestinian state.

=== Philistia ===
Philistia:

- Canaanite: 𐤐𐤋𐤔𐤕 (p.l.ʃ.t)
- Hebrew

- Israeli Hebrew: פלשת (Pleshet)
- Tiberian Hebrew: פְּלֶשֶׁת Hebrew pronunciation: [pəˈlɛʃɛθ]

- Latin: Palæstina - from Greek
- Turkish: Filist

=== Eber-Nari and Transeuphratea ===
Eber-Nari (meaning 'Beyond the River [i.e. the Euphrates]' in Akkadian) was the name given by Assyrians to the lands west of the Euphrates following the Assyrian conquest of Aram and of Phoenicia, as these lands became part of the Neo-Assyrian Empire. Eber-Nari later became part of the Neo-Babylonian Empire and finally a satrapy of the Achaemenid Empire. It is also sometimes referred to in modern historiography as Transeuphratea (New Latin: Transeuphrat(a)ea or more rarely Transeuphratena; French: Transeuphratène).

== Medieval and modern history ==
=== Shaam ===
The Arabic name for the region of Levant is Shaam (Arabic: أَلشَّام, romanized: al-Shām) comes from the Arabic root meaning "left" or "north". After the Islamic conquest of the region, the term was applied to the Levant (Byzantine Syria).

In ancient times, Baalshamin or Ba'al Šamem (Imperial Aramaic: ܒܥܠ ܫܡܝܢ, romanized: Lord of Heaven(s)), was a Semitic sky-god in Canaan/Phoenicia and ancient Palmyra. However, the syllable "sham" in Baalshamin has nothing to do with the name shaam but is just by chance the middle syllable of the word for "sky", comparable to Hebrew שָׁמַיִם (shamayim).

=== Levant ===
Medieval Italians called the region Levante after its easterly location where the sun "rises"; this term was adopted from Italian and French into many other languages.

=== Outremer ===
Frankish Crusaders called the Levant Outremer in French, which means "overseas". In France, this general term was colloquially applied more specifically to the Levant because of heavy Frankish involvement in the Crusades and the foundation of the Latin Kingdom of Jerusalem and other Latin settlements scattered throughout the area.

=== Eastern Mediterranean ===
Eastern Mediterranean is a term that denotes the lands or states geographically in the eastern, to the east of, or around the east of the Mediterranean Sea, or with cultural affinities to this region. The Eastern Mediterranean includes Cyprus, Syria, Lebanon, Palestine, Israel, and Jordan. The term Mediterranean derives from the Latin word mediterraneus, meaning "in the middle of earth" or "between lands" (medius, "middle, between" + terra, "land, earth"). This is on account of the sea's intermediary position between the continents of Africa and Europe.

=== Holy Land ===
In different languages:

- Arabic: اَلْأَرْض الْمُقَدَّسَة (Al-Arḍ al-Muqaddasah in the Islamic holy book, the Quran)
- Greek: Άγιοι Τόποι (Hagioi Topoi, modern Greek pronunciation: [aji topi]), literally: "Holy Places")
- Hebrew: ארץ הקדש (Erets ha-Kodesh)
- Latin: Terra Sancta
- Turkish: Kutsal Topraklar

The Holy Land is a term used in Judeo-Christian tradition to refer to sacred sites of the Levant — such as Shiloh, Jerusalem, Bethlehem and Nazareth — but is also often used to refer to the Levant (and historical Canaan) as a whole.

== See also ==
- Names of Jerusalem
- Near East

== Sources ==
- Calmet, Augustinus (1729). Prolegomena (in Latin).
- Cellarius, Christophorus (1691). Geographia Antiqua (in Latin).
- Pfeiffer, August (1693). Introductio in Orientem (in Latin).
- Schöttgen, Christian (1742). Horae Hebraicae et Talmudicae (in Latin).
