= Damascena (disambiguation) =

Damascena was the territory surrounding the city of Damascus in Roman and Byzantine Syria.

Damascena may also refer to:

- Nigella damascena, annual garden flowering plant
- Rosa damascena, rose hybrid
- Iris damascena, a flowering bulb

== See also ==
- Damascene (disambiguation)
