= Abjad =

Writing system where each symbol stands for a consonant

An abjad (/ˈæbdʒæd/; or abgad, lit. 'alphabet') is a writing system in which only consonants are represented by letter signs, leaving the vowels to be inferred by the reader (unless represented otherwise, such as by diacritics). This contrasts with alphabets that provide graphemes for both consonants and vowels. The term was introduced in 1990 by Peter T. Daniels. Other terms for the same concept include partial phonemic script, segmentally linear defective phonographic script, consonantary, consonant writing, and consonantal alphabet.

Impure abjads, such as modern Arabic and Hebrew scripts, represent vowels with either optional diacritics or a limited number of distinct vowel graphemes, or both.

== Etymology ==
The name abjad is based on the Arabic alphabet's first four letters in their original alphabetical order – corresponding to ʾa, b, j, and d – which reflects the alphabetical order ʾaleph, bet, gimel, dalet in other consonantal Semitic scripts such as Phoenician, Hebrew, and other Semitic proto-alphabets classified within the family of scripts used to write West Semitic languages.

== Terminology ==
According to the formulations of Peter T. Daniels, abjads differ from alphabets in that only consonants, not vowels, are represented among the basic graphemes. Abjads differ from abugidas, another category defined by Daniels, in that in abjads, the vowel sound is implied by phonology, and where vowel marks exist for the system, such as niqqud for Hebrew and ḥarakāt for Arabic, their use is optional and not the dominant (or literate) form. Abugidas mark all vowels (other than the "inherent" vowel) with a diacritic, a minor attachment to the letter, a standalone grapheme, or (in Canadian Aboriginal syllabics) by rotation of the letter. Some abugidas use a special symbol to suppress the inherent vowel so that the consonant alone can be properly represented. In a syllabary, a grapheme denotes a complete syllable, that is, either a lone vowel sound or a combination of a vowel sound with one or more consonant sounds.

The contrast of abjad versus alphabet has been rejected by other scholars because abjad is also used as a term for the Arabic numeral system. Also, it may be taken as suggesting that consonantal alphabets, in contrast to e.g. the Greek alphabet, were not yet true alphabets. Florian Coulmas, a critic of Daniels and of the abjad terminology, argues that this terminology can confuse alphabets with "transcription systems", and that there is no reason to relegate the Hebrew, Aramaic or Phoenician alphabets to second-class status as an "incomplete alphabet". However, Daniels's terminology has found acceptance in the linguistic community.

== Origins and history ==
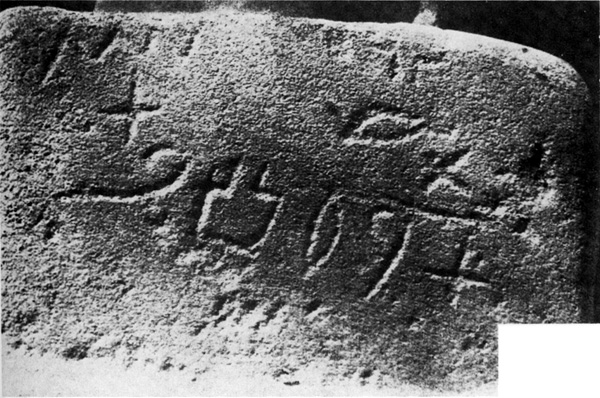
A specimen of Proto-Sinaitic script containing a phrase which may mean 'to Baalat'. The line running from the upper left to lower right reads mt l b^{c}lt.

The Proto-Sinaitic script represents the earliest-known example of alphabetic writing. This script is generally considered to have been developed around the Sinai Peninsula during the Middle Bronze Age by speakers of an ancient West Semitic language who repurposed pictographic elements of local Egyptian hieroglyphs in order to construct a new script that represented the consonants of their own language using acrophony. The Proto-Sinaitic script is thought to represent, or at least indicate the existence of, an early ancestor of the many later Semitic consonantal scripts which continued to develop over time into more abstract, less visually representational forms, including the Phoenician abjad.

The Phoenician abjad was a radical simplification of phonetic writing. Unlike other scripts, such as Mesopotamian cuneiform (logographic and syllabic) and Egyptian hieroglyphs (logographic and consonantal), the Phoenician abjad consisted of only a few dozen symbols. Presumably, the relative simplicity of the Phoenician abjad made this script easy to learn, allowed it to gain widespread usage, and influenced how readily it was adopted or adapted into the development of other scripts by non-Phoenicians who encountered seafaring Phoenician merchants and their script which they brought with them as they traded throughout the ancient Mediterranean world during the first millennium BCE.

During these exchanges, the Phoenician script gave rise to a number of new writing systems, including the widely used Aramaic abjad and the Greek alphabet. The Greek alphabet was later developed into several alphabets, including Etruscan, Coptic, Cyrillic, and Latin (via Etruscan), while Aramaic became the ancestor of many abjads and abugidas of Asia, particularly in and around India, Southeast Asia, and Oceania.

Other sister scripts to Phoenician, that branched from Proto-Sinaitic script are the South Semitic scripts with its two main branches; the Ancient North Arabian scripts that were used in north and central Arabia, until it was displaced by the Arabic alphabet and Ancient South Arabian, which evolved later into the Geʽez script, still being used in Eritrea and Ethiopia.

== Impure abjads ==
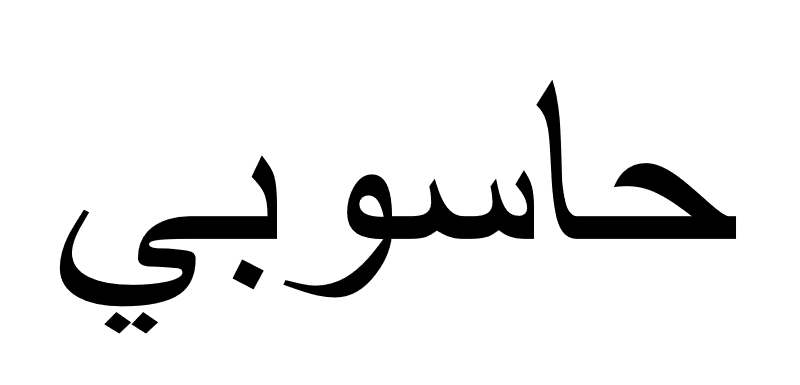
The Arabic word ḥāsūbī 'computational', illustrating the use of matres lectionis alif, wāw, and yā’ to write long vowels as in an impure abjad

Impure abjads have characters for some vowels, optional vowel diacritics, or both. The term pure abjad refers to scripts entirely lacking in vowel indicators. However, most abjads, such as Arabic, Hebrew, Aramaic, and Pahlavi, are "impure" abjads – that is, they also contain symbols for some of the vowel phonemes, although the said non-diacritic vowel letters are also used to write certain consonants, particularly approximants that sound similar to long vowels. A "pure" abjad is exemplified (perhaps) by very early forms of ancient Phoenician, though at some point (at least by the 9th century BC) it and most of the contemporary Semitic abjads had begun to overload a few of the consonant symbols with a secondary function as vowel markers, called matres lectionis. This practice was at first rare and limited in scope but became increasingly common and more developed in later times.

=== Addition of vowels ===
In the 9th century BC the Greeks adapted the Phoenician script for use in their own language. The phonetic structure of the Greek language created too many ambiguities when vowels went unrepresented, so the script was modified. They did not need letters for the guttural sounds represented by aleph, he, heth or ayin, so these symbols were assigned vocalic values. The letters waw and yod were also adapted into vowel signs; along with he, these were already used as matres lectionis in Phoenician. The major innovation of Greek was to dedicate these symbols exclusively and unambiguously to vowel sounds that could be combined arbitrarily with consonants (as opposed to syllabaries such as Linear B which usually have vowel symbols but cannot combine them with consonants to form arbitrary syllables).

Abugidas developed along a slightly different route. The basic consonantal symbol was considered to have an inherent "a" vowel sound. Hooks or short lines attached to various parts of the basic letter modify the vowel. In this way, the South Arabian abjad evolved into the Geʽez script of Ethiopia between the 5th century BC and the 5th century AD. Similarly, the Brāhmī abugida of the Indian subcontinent developed around the 3rd century BC (from the Aramaic abjad, it has been hypothesized).

== Abjads and the structure of Semitic languages ==
The abjad form of writing is well-adapted to the morphological structure of the Semitic languages it was developed to write. This is because words in Semitic languages are formed from a root consisting of (usually) three consonants, the vowels being used to indicate inflectional or derived forms. For instance, according to Classical Arabic and Modern Standard Arabic, from the Arabic root ك‌ت‌ب K-T-B (to write) can be derived the forms كَتَبَ kataba (he wrote), كَتَبْتَ katabta (you (masculine singular) wrote), يَكْتُبُ yaktubu (he writes), and مَكْتَبَة maktabah (library). In most cases, the absence of full glyphs for vowels makes the common root clearer, allowing readers to guess the meaning of unfamiliar words from familiar roots (especially in conjunction with context clues) and improving word recognition while reading for practiced readers.

== Adaptation for use as true alphabets ==
The Arabic abjad has been adapted to perform as true alphabets when used to write several languages, including Kurdish, Swahili, Malay, and Uyghur and historically Bosnian, Mozarabic, Aragonese, Portuguese, Spanish and Afrikaans, with some letters or letter combinations being repurposed to represent vowels. The Hebrew abjad has also been adapted to write Jewish languages like Ladino and Yiddish.

== Comparative chart of abjads, extinct and extant ==
Name of abjad	In use	Cursive	Direction	# of letters	Matres lectionis	Area of origin	Used by	Languages	Time period (age)	Earlier scripts that influenced this abjad	Later scripts influenced by this abjad
Arabic	yes	yes	right-left	28	3	Middle East	Over 400 million people	Arabic, Kashmiri, Persian, Pashto, Uyghur, Kurdish, Urdu, many others	512 CE	Nabataean	Thaana Hanifi Rohingya
Syriac	yes	yes	right-left	22 consonants	3	Middle East	Syriac Christianity, Assyrians	Aramaic: Syriac, Assyrian Neo-Aramaic, Turoyo, Mlahso	c. 100 BCE	Aramaic	Nabataean, Palmyrene, Mandaic, Parthian, Pahlavi, Sogdian, Avestan and Manichaean
Hebrew	yes	yes	right-left	22 consonants + 5 final letters	4	Middle East	Israelis, Jewish diaspora communities, Second Temple Judea	Hebrew, Judeo-Arabic, Judeo-Aramaic, Judeo-Persian, Judeo-Italian, Yiddish, Ladino, many others	2nd century BCE	Paleo-Hebrew, Early Aramaic	
Aramaic (Imperial)	no	no	right-left	22	3	Middle East	Achaemenid Persian Empire, Sasanian (Neo-Persian) Empire, Neo-Assyrian Empire and their regional satrapies	Imperial Aramaic, Hebrew (after the Babylonian Captivity in the 6th century BCE)	c. 500 BCE	Phoenician	Late Hebrew, Nabataean, Syriac
Aramaic (Early)	no	no	right-left	22	none	Middle East	Various Semitic Peoples		c. 1000 – c. 900 BCE	Phoenician	Hebrew, Imperial Aramaic.
Nabataean	no	yes (semi-cursive form developed into early Arabic script)	right-left	22	none	Middle East, Petra, (now Jordan)	Nabataean Kingdom	Nabataean	200 BCE	Aramaic	Arabic
Phoenician	no	no	right-left, boustrophedon	22	none	Middle East, Levant (now Lebanon and Syria)	Canaanites	Phoenician, Punic, Hebrew	c. 1500 – c. 1000 BCE	Proto-Canaanite Alphabet	Punic (variant), Greek, Etruscan, Latin, Arabic, Hebrew
Punic	no	no	right-left	22	none	Carthage (nowTunisia), North Africa, Mediterranean	Punic Culture	Punic, Neo-Punic (after the siege of Carthage in 146 BCE)	8th century BCE - 6th century CE	Phoenician	
Ancient North Arabian	no	no	right-left	29	yes	Arabian Peninsula	Northern Arabians (Pre-Islamic Arabia)	Old Arabic,Ancient North Arabian languages	8th century BCE - 4th century CE	Proto-Sinaitic	
Ancient South Arabian	no	yes (Zabūr - cursive form of the South Arabian script)	right-left, boustrophedon	29	yes	Southern Arabia (now Yemen)	Southern Arabians	Amharic, Tigrinya, Tigre, Semitic, Cushitic, Nilo-Saharan	900 BCE	Proto-Sinaitic	Geʽez syllabary (Ethiopia and Eritrea)
Sabaean	no	no	right-left, boustrophedon	29	none	Southern Arabia (Sheba)	Southern Arabians	Sabaic	c. 500 BCE	Byblos	Ethiopic (Eritrea & Ethiopia)
Parthian	no	no	right-left	22	yes	Parthia (modern-day equivalent of Northeastern Iran, Southern Turkmenistan and Northwest Afghanistan)	Parthian & Sassanian periods of Persian Empire	Parthian	c. 200 BCE	Aramaic	
Ugaritic	no	yes	left-right	30	none, 3 characters for glottal stop + vowel	Ugarit (modern-day Ras Shamra in Northern Syria)	Ugarites	Ugaritic, Hurrian	c. 1400 BCE	Proto-Sinaitic (or some unknown intermediary script)	
Proto-Sinaitic, Proto-Canaanite	no	no	left-right	24	none	Egypt, Sinai, Canaan	Canaanites	Canaanite	c. 1900 – c. 1700 BCE	In conjunction with Egyptian Hieroglyphs	Paleo-Hebrew, Phoenician, Aramaic,Hebrew
Samaritan	yes (700 people)	no	right-left	22	none	Levant	Samaritans (Nablus and Holon)	Samaritan Aramaic, Samaritan Hebrew	c. 100 BCE – c. 1 CE	Paleo-Hebrew Alphabet	
Tifinagh	yes	no	bottom-top, right-left, left-right,	31	yes	North Africa	Berbers	Berber languages	2nd millennium BCE	Phoenician, Arabic	Neo-Tifinagh
Middle Persian, (Pahlavi)	no	no	right-left	22	3	Middle East	Sassanian Empire	Pahlavi, Middle Persian	c. 200 BCE – c. 700 CE	Aramaic	Psalter Pahlavi, Avestan
Psalter Pahlavi	no	yes	right-left	21	yes	Northwestern China	Persian Script for Paper Writing		c. 400 CE	Syriac	
Sogdian	no	no (yes in later versions)	right-left, left-right (vertical)	20	3	parts of China (Xinjiang), Uzbekistan, Tajikistan, Pakistan	Buddhists, Manichaens	Sogdian	c. 400 CE	Syriac	Old Uyghur alphabet
Hanifi Rohingya	yes	no	right-left	28	2	northern Rakhine State and Chittagong	Rohingya people	Rohingya language	1980s	Arabic	
Thaana	yes	yes	right-left	24	1	Maldives	Maldivians	Maldivian (Dhivehi)	17th century	Arabic, Dhives Akuru	
Libyco-Berber	no	no	bottom-top,right left,left-right	23	none	North Africa	Berbers	Guanche, Garamantian	c. 7th century	Tifinagh	
Chorasmian	no	no	right-left	19	none	Khwarazm	Ancient Iranian peoples	Khwarezmian language	early 8th century	Sogdian	
Elymaic	no	no	right-left	22	1	Khuzestan province,Iran	Ancient Iranian peoples	Achaemenid Aramaic	2nd century	Aramaic	
Hatran	no	no	right-left	22	none	Iraq	Mesopotamians	Hatran Aramaic	100 BCE	Aramaic	
Manichaean	no	no	right-left	25	2	Northwest China		Middle Iranian	2nd century	Sogdian	Palmyrene
Palmyrene	no	no	right-left	23	none	Syria		Palmyrene Aramaic	100 BCE	Aramaic, Manichaean	

== See also ==
- Abecedarium (inscription consisting of the letters of an alphabet)
- Abjad numerals (Arabic alphanumeric code)
- Disemvoweling (removal of vowels from a text)
- Gematria (numerological practice of reading a word or phrase as a number or alphanumeric code, particularly in the context of Jewish mysticism based on the text of the Hebrew Bible, but also in Greek and English versions of the Bible as well as for other significant texts)
- Numerology (esoteric study of the mystical properties of numbers)
- Shorthand (constructed writing systems that are structurally abjads)

== Sources ==
- Ager, Simon (2015). "Abjads / Consonant alphabets". Omniglot.
- Daniels, Peter T. (2013). "The Arabic Writing system". In Owens, Jonathan (ed.). The Oxford Handbook of Arabic Linguistics. Oxford University Press. p. 415. ISBN 9780199764136.
- Daniels, Peter T. & Bright, William, eds. (1996). The World's Writing Systems. Oxford University Press. p. 4. ISBN 978-0195079937.
- Ekhtiar, Maryam (2011). Masterpieces from the Department of Islamic Art in the Metropolitan Museum of Art. New York: Metropolitan Museum of Art. p. 21. ISBN 9781588394347.
- Gnanadesikan, Amalia E. (2017). "Towards a Typology of Phonemic Scripts". Writing Systems Research. 9 (1). Taylor & Francis: 14–35. doi:10.1080/17586801.2017.1308239.
- Frajzyngier, Zygmunt; Shay, Erin, eds. (2012). "Introduction". The Afroasiatic languages. Cambridge Language Surveys. Cambridge: Cambridge University Press. p. 2. ISBN 9780521865333.
- Lam, Joseph (2015). "Ch. 12. The Invention and Development of the Alphabet". In Woods, Christopher; Teeter, Emily; Emberling, Geoff (eds.). Visible Language: Inventions of Writing in the Ancient Middle East and Beyond. Oriental Institute Museum Publications No. 32 (2nd, revised with minor corrections ed.). The Oriental Institute of the University of Chicago. pp. 189–190. ISBN 9781885923769.
- Lehmann, Reinhard G. (2011). "Ch 2 27-30-22-26. How Many Letters Needs an Alphabet? The Case of Semitic". In de Voogt, Alex & Quack, Joachim Friedrich (eds.). The idea of writing: Writing across borders. Leiden: Brill. pp. 11–52. ISBN 978-9004215450.
- Lipiński, Edward (1994). Studies in Aramaic Inscriptions and Onomastics II. Leuven, Belgium: Peeters Publishers. pp. 29–30. ISBN 9068316109.
- Lo, Lawrence (2012). "Berber". Ancient Scripts. Archived from the original on 26 August 2017.
- Winters, Jonah; Lewis, Frank (1999). "Overview of the Abjad numerological system". Báhá'i Library Online. Archived from the original on 6 October 2010.
- Wright, W. (1967). A Grammar of the Arabic Language [transl. from the German of Caspari]. Vol. 1 (3rd ed.). CUP. p. 28. ISBN 978-0521094559.
