= Damascus (disambiguation) =

Damascus is the capital of Syria.

Damascus may also refer to:

== Places ==
=== United States ===
- Damascus, Arkansas
- Damascus, Georgia
- Damascus, Maryland
- Damascus, Ohio
- Damascus, Oregon
- Damascus, Pennsylvania
- Damascus, Virginia
- Damascus Township, Wayne County, Pennsylvania, located along New York State Route 97

=== Elsewhere ===
- Damascus, New Brunswick, Canada
- Damascus, Queensland, a locality in the Bundaberg Region, Australia
- Damascus Governorate, in Syria

== Other uses ==
- Damascus (horse), an American Thoroughbred racehorse
- Damascus affair, an incident involving the Jewish community in Damascus in 1840
- Damascus steel, a material used in making blades
- "Damascus moment" or "Damascene moment", in reference to the Conversion of Paul
- Damascus Securities Exchange
- Damson, once known as a Damascus plum
- Damascus College Ballarat, Secondary school in Ballarat, Victoria, Australia
- The 1980 Damascus Titan missile explosion
- Damascus (novel), 2019 novel by Australian author Christos Tsiolkas
- "Damascus", a 2026 song by Gorillaz from their album The Mountain

== See also ==
- Damascene (disambiguation), an adjective derived from the name of the place in Syria
