= Manichaean script =

Abjad-based writing system

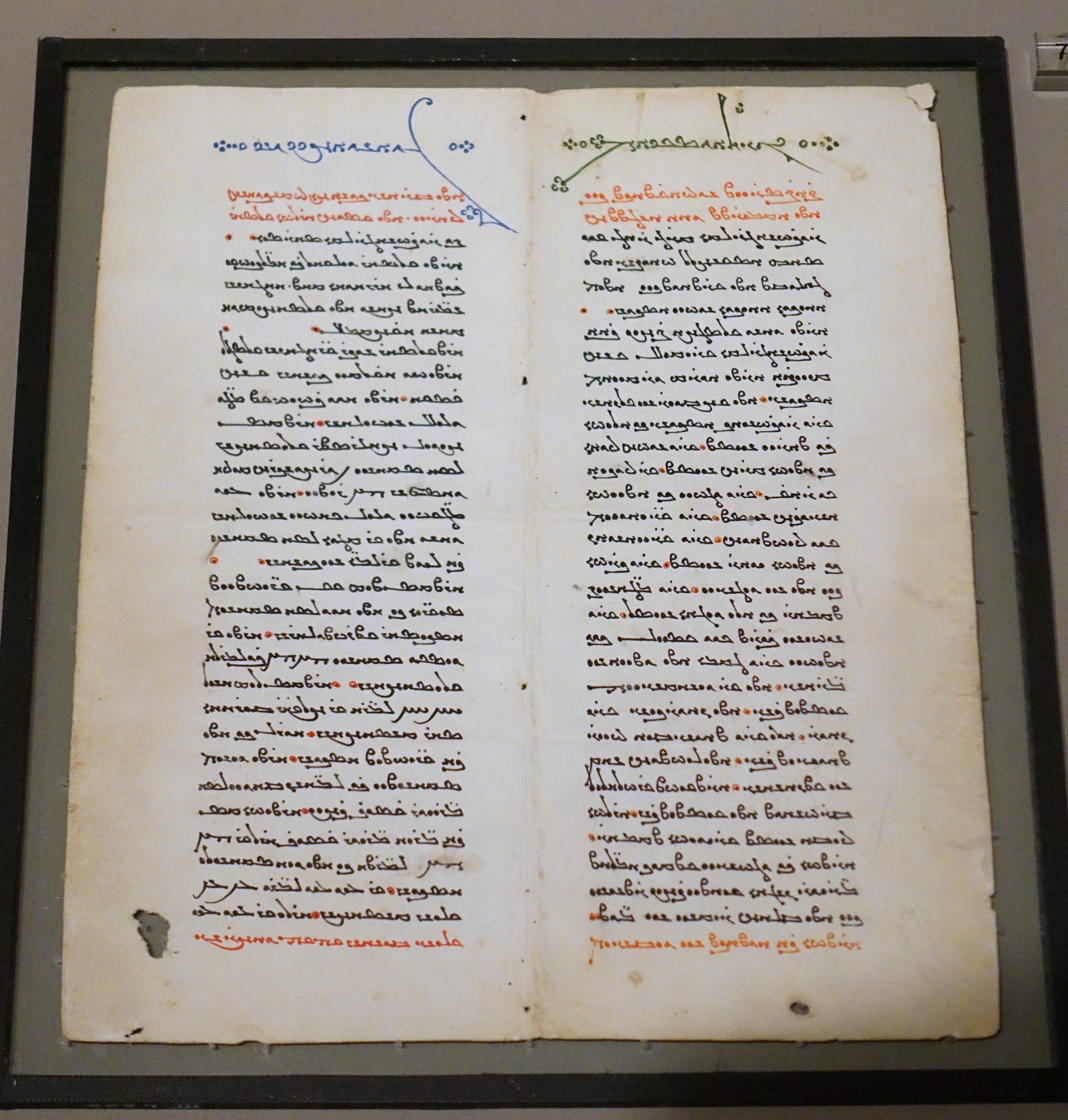
- Manichaean cosmogonic text in the Sogdian language
- Script type: Abjad
- Period: 3rd century – c. 10th century CE
- Direction: Right-to-left script
- Languages: Middle Iranian and Tocharian languages

Related scripts
- Parent systems: Egyptian hieroglyphs: Proto-Sinaitic alphabet; Phoenician alphabet; Aramaic alphabet; Palmyrene alphabet; Manichaean script

ISO 15924
- ISO 15924: Mani (139), Manichaean

Unicode
- Unicode alias: Manichaean
- Unicode range: U+10AC0–U+10AFF; Final Accepted Script Proposal

The Manichaean script is an abjad-based writing system rooted in the Semitic family of alphabets and associated with the spread of Manichaeism from southwest to central Asia and beyond, beginning in the third century CE. It is descended from the Palmyrene alphabet and consequently sometimes treated as a variant of the Syriac script (which also descends from Palmyrene). Thus, the Manichaean script is closely related to the Palmyrene alphabet of Palmyrene Aramaic and the Estrangelo script of Syriac. It bears a more distant sibling relationship to early forms of the Pahlavi scripts, both systems having developed from the Imperial Aramaic alphabet, in which the Achaemenid court rendered its particular, official dialect of Aramaic. The Manichaean script is so named because Manichaean texts attribute its design to Mani himself. Middle Persian is written with this alphabet.

The Iranologist Desmond Durkin-Meisterernst notes that the Manichaean script was mainly used to write numerous Middle Iranian languages (Manichaean Middle Persian, Parthian, Sogdian, Early New Persian, Bactrian) and Old Uyghur (a Turkic language).

== Nomenclature ==
The term "Manichean" was introduced as designation for the script by the German scholar Friedrich W. K. Müller, because of the use of the script in Manichean texts. Müller was the first scholar in modern times (in 1903/4) to read the script.

== Overview ==
Older Manichaean texts appear in a script and language that is still identifiable as Syriac/Aramaic and these compositions are then classified as Syriac/Aramaic texts. Later texts using Manichaean script are attested in the literature of three Middle Iranian language ethnolects:

- Sogdian — the dialect of Sogdia in the east, which had a large Manichean population.
- Parthian — the dialect of Parthia in the northeast, which is indistinguishable from Medean of the northwest.
- Middle Persian — the dialect of Pars (Persis, or Persia proper) in southwest Iran.

The Manichaean system does not have a high incidence of Semitic language logograms and ideograms inherited from chancellery Imperial Aramaic that are an essential characteristic of the Pahlavi system. Besides that, Manichaean spelling was less conservative or historical and corresponded closer to contemporary pronunciation: e.g. a word such as āzād "noble, free" was written ʼčʼt in Pahlavi, but ʼʼzʼd in Manichaean Middle Persian of the same period.

Manichaean script was not the only script used to render Manichaean manuscripts. When writing in Sogdian, which was frequently the case, Manichaean scribes frequently used the Sogdian alphabet ("Uighur script"). Likewise, outside Manichaeism, the dialect of Parsa (Persia proper) was also recorded in other systems, including Pahlavi scripts (in which case it is known as "Pahlevi" or Zoroastrian Middle Persian) and Avestan alphabet (in which case it is known as Pazend).

As Manichaeism was persecuted around Mesopotamia and the regions of the Sasanian Empire, its origins, it became well-established in Central Asia and along the Silk Road. It became an official state religion among the Uyghurs for five centuries (from the eighth through the twelfth century), and thus many surviving manuscripts are found in the Turpan region in the Iranian languages aforementioned, Old Uyghur, and the Tocharian languages.

In the 19th century, German expeditions discovered a number of Manichaean manuscripts at Bulayïq on the Silk Road near Turpan in what is now Xinjiang. Many of these manuscripts are today preserved in Berlin.

== Characters ==
Like most abjads, Manichaean is written from right to left and lacks vowels. Particularly, it has certain consonants that join on both sides, some that join only on the right, and some that only join on the left, and some that do not join at all, unlike the most well-known abjad, Arabic, which has only consonants that join on both sides or on the right. Manichaean has a separate sign for the conjunction "ud" (and); two dots are placed above characters to indicate abbreviations, and there are several punctuation marks to indicate headlines, page divisions, sentence divisions, and others.

There are obligatory conjuncts for certain combinations involving "n" and "y". The numbers are built from units of 1, 5, 10, 20 and 100 and can be visually identifiable. There are also some alternate forms of certain characters.

Letters
𐫀 aleph	𐫁 beth	𐫂 bheth	𐫃 gimel	𐫄 ghimel	𐫅 daleth	𐫆 he	𐫇 waw	𐫈 ud, and	𐫉 zayin	𐫊 zhayin
𐫋 jayin	𐫌 jhayin	𐫍 heth	𐫎 theth	𐫏 yodh	𐫐 kaph	𐫑 xaph	𐫒 khaph	𐫓 lamedh	𐫔 dhamedh	𐫕 thamedh
𐫖 mem	𐫗 nun	𐫘 samekh	𐫙 ayin	𐫚 aayin	𐫛 pe	𐫜 fe	𐫝 sadhe	𐫞 qoph	𐫟 xoph	𐫠 qhoph
𐫡 resh	𐫢 shin	𐫣 sshin	𐫤 taw							

Punctuation
𐫰 star	𐫱 fleuron	𐫴 dot	𐫳 dot within dot	𐫵 double dot	𐫲 double dot within dot	𐫶 line filler

Numerals
𐫫 1	𐫬 5	𐫭 10	𐫮 20	𐫯 100

== Unicode ==
The Manichaean alphabet (U+10AC0–U+10AFF) was added to the Unicode Standard in June 2014 with the release of version 7.0.

Manichaean^{[1]}^{[2]} Official Unicode Consortium code chart (PDF)
	0	1	2	3	4	5	6	7	8	9	A	B	C	D	E	F
U+10ACx	𐫀	𐫁	𐫂	𐫃	𐫄	𐫅	𐫆	𐫇	𐫈	𐫉	𐫊	𐫋	𐫌	𐫍	𐫎	𐫏
U+10ADx	𐫐	𐫑	𐫒	𐫓	𐫔	𐫕	𐫖	𐫗	𐫘	𐫙	𐫚	𐫛	𐫜	𐫝	𐫞	𐫟
U+10AEx	𐫠	𐫡	𐫢	𐫣	𐫤	𐫥	𐫦					𐫫	𐫬	𐫭	𐫮	𐫯
U+10AFx	𐫰	𐫱	𐫲	𐫳	𐫴	𐫵	𐫶									
Notes 1.As of Unicode version 17.0 2.Grey areas indicate non-assigned code points

== Sources ==
- Durkin-Meisterernst, Desmond (October 14, 2005). "Manichean script". Encyclopaedia Iranica.
