= Aramaic alphabet =

Script used to write the Aramaic language

Aramaic script
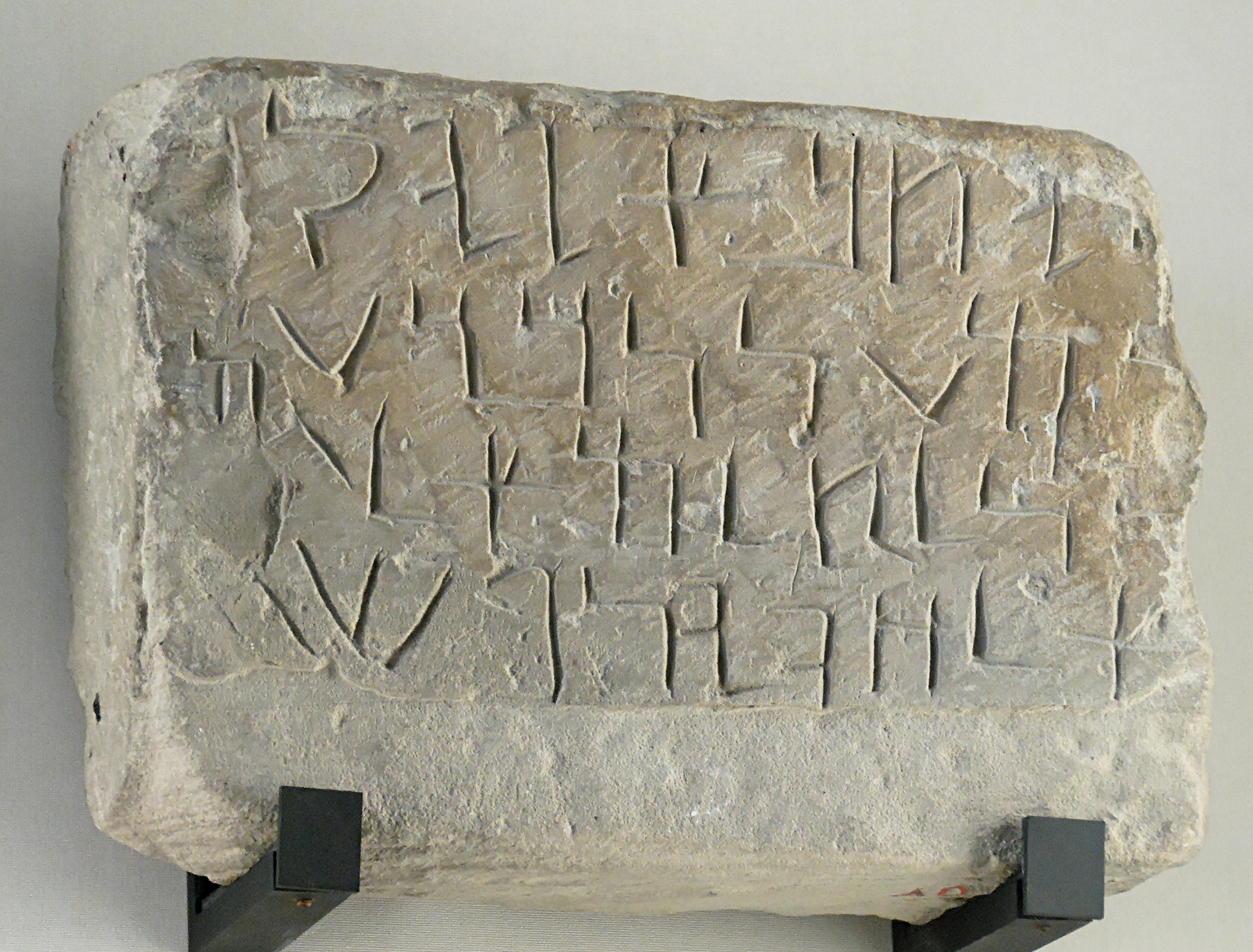
- Aramaic inscription from Tayma, containing a dedicatory inscription to the god Salm
- Script type: Abjad
- Period: 800 BC to AD 600
- Direction: Right-to-left
- Languages: Aramaic (Syriac and Mandaic), Hebrew, Edomite

Related scripts
- Parent systems: Egyptian hieroglyphs: Proto-Sinaitic; Phoenician; Aramaic script
- Child systems: Hebrew; Nabataean; Arabic; Palmyrene; Manichaean; Syriac; Hatran; Mandaic; Elymaic; Pahlavi; Kharosthi; Brahmi (debated)

ISO 15924
- ISO 15924: Armi (124), Imperial Aramaic

Unicode
- Unicode alias: Imperial Aramaic
- Unicode range: U+10840–U+1085F

The ancient Aramaic alphabet was used to write the Aramaic languages spoken by ancient Aramean pre-Christian peoples throughout the Fertile Crescent. It was also adopted by other peoples as their own alphabet when empires and their subjects underwent linguistic Aramaization during a language shift for governing purposes — a precursor to Arabization centuries later — including among the Assyrians and Babylonians who permanently replaced their Akkadian language and its cuneiform script with Aramaic and its script, and among Jews (but not Samaritans) who adopted the Aramaic language as their vernacular and started using the Aramaic alphabet, which they call "Ktav Ashuri", even for writing Hebrew, displacing the former Paleo-Hebrew alphabet. The modern Hebrew alphabet derives from the Aramaic alphabet, in contrast to the modern Samaritan alphabet, which derives from Paleo-Hebrew.

The letters in the Aramaic alphabet all represent consonants, some of which are also used as matres lectionis to indicate long vowels. Writing systems, like the Aramaic, that indicate consonants but do not indicate most vowels other than by means of matres lectionis or added diacritical signs, have been called abjads by Peter T. Daniels to distinguish them from alphabets such as the Greek alphabet, that represent vowels more systematically. The term was coined to avoid the notion that a writing system that represents sounds must be either a syllabary or an alphabet, which would imply that a system like Aramaic must be either a syllabary, as argued by Ignace Gelb, or an incomplete or deficient alphabet, as most other writers had said before Daniels. Daniels put forward that this is a different type of writing system, intermediate between syllabaries and 'full' alphabets.

The Aramaic alphabet is historically significant since virtually all modern Middle Eastern writing systems can be traced back to it. That is primarily due to the widespread usage of the Aramaic language after it was adopted as both a lingua franca and the official language of the Neo-Assyrian Empire and Neo-Babylonian Empire, and their successor, the Achaemenid Empire. Among the descendant scripts in modern use, the Jewish Hebrew alphabet bears the closest relation to the Imperial Aramaic script of the 5th century BC, with an identical letter inventory and, for the most part, nearly identical letter shapes. By contrast the Samaritan Hebrew script is directly descended from Proto-Hebrew/Phoenician script, which was the ancestor of the Aramaic alphabet. The Aramaic alphabet was also an ancestor to the Syriac alphabet, Mongolian script, Kharosthi, and Brahmi, and the Nabataean alphabet, which is ancestral to the Arabic alphabet.

== History ==
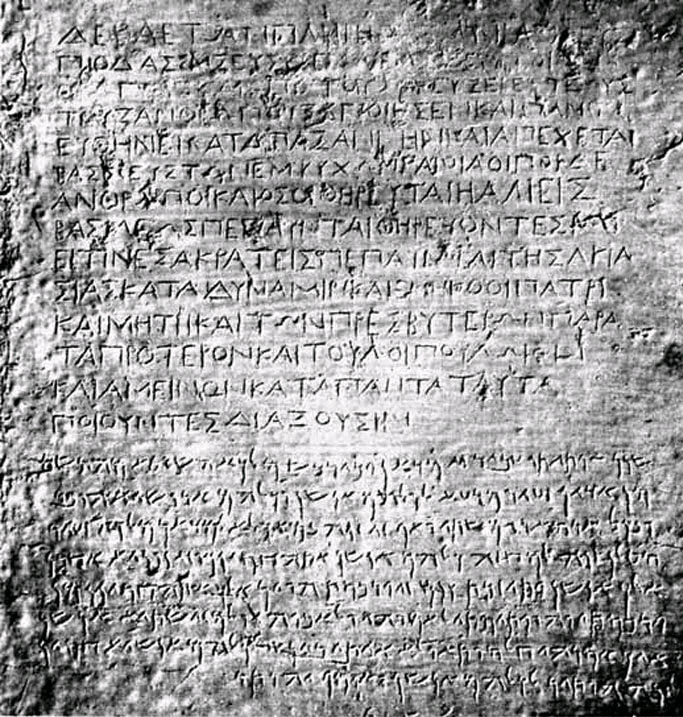
The Kandahar Bilingual Rock Inscription, a Greek and Aramaic inscription by the Mauryan emperor Ashoka at Kandahar, Afghanistan, 3rd century BC

The earliest inscriptions in the Aramaic language use the Phoenician alphabet. Over time, the alphabet developed into the Aramaic alphabet by the 8th century BC. It was used to write the Aramaic languages spoken by ancient Aramean pre-Christian tribes throughout the Fertile Crescent. It was also adopted by other peoples as their own alphabet when empires and their subjects underwent linguistic Aramaization during a language shift for governing purposes — a precursor to Arabization centuries later.

These include the Assyrians and Babylonians, who permanently replaced their Akkadian language and its cuneiform script with Aramaic and its script, and among Jews, but not Samaritans, who adopted the Aramaic language as their vernacular and started using the Aramaic alphabet even for writing Hebrew, displacing the former Paleo-Hebrew alphabet. The modern Hebrew alphabet derives from the Aramaic alphabet, in contrast to the modern Samaritan alphabet, which derives from Paleo-Hebrew.

=== Achaemenid Empire (The First Persian Empire) ===
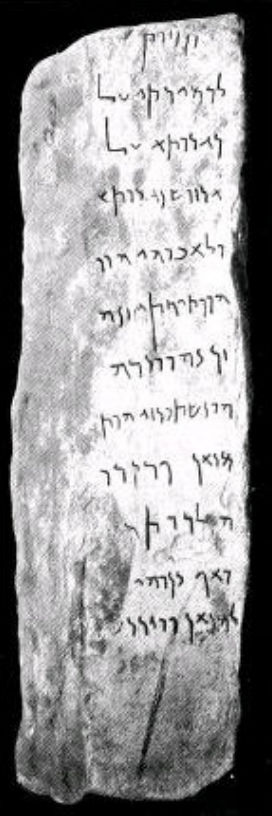
Aramaic inscription of Taxila, Pakistan probably by the emperor Ashoka around 260 BCE

Incantation bowl with Aramaic script, from Babylon, Iraq, 4th to 7th century AD, on display in the Pergamon Museum

Around 500 BC, following the Achaemenid conquest of Mesopotamia under Darius I, Old Aramaic was adopted by the Persians as the "vehicle for written communication between the different regions of the vast Persian empire with its different peoples and languages. The use of a single official language, which modern scholarship has dubbed as Official Aramaic, Imperial Aramaic or Achaemenid Aramaic, can be assumed to have greatly contributed to the astonishing success of the Achaemenid Persians in holding their far-flung empire together for as long as they did."

Imperial Aramaic was highly standardised. Its orthography was based more on historical roots than any spoken dialect and was influenced by Old Persian. The Aramaic glyph forms of the period are often divided into two main styles, the "lapidary" form, usually inscribed on hard surfaces like stone monuments, and a cursive form whose lapidary form tended to be more conservative by remaining more visually similar to Phoenician and early Aramaic. Both were in use through the Achaemenid Persian period, but the cursive form steadily gained ground over the lapidary, which had largely disappeared by the 3rd century BC.

For centuries after the fall of the Achaemenid Empire in 331 BC, Imperial Aramaic, or something near enough to it to be recognisable, remained an influence on the various native Iranian languages. The Aramaic script survived as the essential characteristics of the Iranian Pahlavi writing system.

30 Aramaic documents from Bactria have been recently discovered, an analysis of which was published in November 2006. The texts, which were rendered on leather, reflect the use of Aramaic in the 4th century BC, in the Persian Achaemenid administration of Bactria and Sogdiana.

The widespread usage of Achaemenid Aramaic in the Middle East led to the gradual adoption of the Aramaic alphabet for writing Hebrew. Formerly, Hebrew had been written using an alphabet closer in form to that of Phoenician, the Paleo-Hebrew alphabet.

=== Aramaic-derived scripts ===
Since the evolution of the Aramaic alphabet out of the Phoenician one was a gradual process, the division of the world's alphabets into the ones derived from the Phoenician one directly, and the ones derived from Phoenician via Aramaic, is somewhat artificial. In general, the alphabets of the Mediterranean region (Anatolia, Greece, Italy) are classified as Phoenician-derived, adapted from around the 8th century BC. Those of the East (the Levant, Persia, Central Asia, and India) are considered Aramaic-derived, adapted from around the 6th century BC from the Imperial Aramaic script of the Achaemenid Empire.

After the fall of the Achaemenid Empire, the unity of the Imperial Aramaic script was lost, diversifying into a number of descendant cursives.

The Hebrew and Nabataean alphabets, as they stood by the Roman era, were little changed in style from the Imperial Aramaic alphabet. Ibn Khaldun (1332–1406) alleges that not only the old Nabataean writing was influenced by the "Syrian script" (i.e. Aramaic), but also the old Chaldean script.

A cursive Hebrew variant developed from the early centuries AD. It remained restricted to the status of a variant used alongside the noncursive. By contrast, the cursive developed out of the Nabataean alphabet in the same period soon became the standard for writing Arabic, evolving into the Arabic alphabet as it stood by the time of the early spread of Islam.

The development of cursive versions of Aramaic led to the creation of the Syriac, Palmyrene and Mandaic alphabets, which formed the basis of the historical scripts of Central Asia, such as the Sogdian and Mongolian alphabets.

The Old Turkic script is generally considered to have its ultimate origins in Aramaic, in particular via the Pahlavi or Sogdian alphabets, as suggested by V. Thomsen, or possibly via Kharosthi (cf., Issyk inscription).

Brahmi script was also possibly derived or inspired by Aramaic. Brahmic family of scripts includes Devanagari.

== Languages using the alphabet ==
Today, Biblical Aramaic, Jewish Neo-Aramaic dialects and the Aramaic language of the Talmud are written in the modern-Hebrew alphabet, distinguished from the Old Hebrew script. In classical Jewish literature, the name given to the modern-Hebrew script was "Ashurit", the ancient Assyrian script, a script now known widely as the Aramaic script. It is believed that, during the period of Assyrian dominion, Aramaic script and language received official status.

Syriac and Christian Neo-Aramaic dialects are today written in the Syriac alphabet, which script has superseded the more ancient Assyrian script and now bears its name. Mandaic is written in the Mandaic alphabet. The near-identical nature of the Aramaic and the classical Hebrew alphabets caused Aramaic text to be typeset mostly in the standard Hebrew script in scholarly literature.

=== Maaloula ===
In Maaloula, one of few surviving communities in which a Western Aramaic dialect is still spoken, an Aramaic Language Institute was established in 2006 by Damascus University that teaches courses to keep the language alive.

Unlike Classical Syriac, which has a rich literary tradition in Syriac-Aramaic script, Western Neo-Aramaic was solely passed down orally for generations until 2006 and was not utilized in a written form.

Therefore, the Language Institute's chairman, George Rizkalla (Rezkallah), undertook the writing of a textbook in Western Neo-Aramaic. Being previously unwritten, Rizkalla opted for the Hebrew alphabet. In 2010, the institute's activities were halted due to concerns that the square Maalouli-Aramaic alphabet used in the program bore a resemblance to the square script of the Hebrew alphabet. As a result, all signs featuring the square Maalouli script were subsequently removed. The program stated that they would instead use the more distinct Syriac-Aramaic alphabet, although use of the Maalouli alphabet has continued to some degree. Al Jazeera Arabic also broadcast a program about Western Neo-Aramaic and the villages in which it is spoken with the square script still in use.

== Letters ==
Name	Imperial Aramaic	Sound Value		Palmyrene	Syriac	Manichaean				Sogdian	Old Turkic	Old Uyghur	Hebrew	Maalouli	Hatran	Inscriptional Parthian	Inscriptional Pahlavi	Chorasmian	Nabataean	Arabic	Elymaic	Mandaic	Kharosthi	Brahmi	Phoenician	Proto-Sinaitic
Name	Imperial Aramaic	Transliteration	IPA	Palmyrene	Syriac	Manichaean				Sogdian	Old Turkic	Old Uyghur	Hebrew	Maalouli	Hatran	Inscriptional Parthian	Inscriptional Pahlavi	Chorasmian	Nabataean	Arabic	Elymaic	Mandaic	Kharosthi	Brahmi	Phoenician	Proto-Sinaitic
ʾĀlap̄*	𐡀	ʾ or nothing	[ʔ] or silent	𐡠	ܐ	𐫀				𐼰	𐰁	𐽰	א		𐣠	𐭀	𐭠	𐾰 𐾱	𐢀 𐢁	ا	𐿠	ࡀ	𐨀	𑀅, 𑀆	𐤀	
Bēṯ	𐡁	hard: b soft: ḇ (also bh, v, β)	hard: [b] soft: [v] or [w]	𐡡	ܒ	𐫁		𐫂		𐼱	𐰋 𐰉	𐽱	ב		𐣡	𐭁	𐭡	𐾲	𐢂 𐢃	ب	𐿡	ࡁ	𐨦	𑀩, 𑀪	𐤁	
Gāmal	𐡂	hard: g soft: ḡ (also g̱, gh, ġ, γ)	hard: [ɡ] soft: [ɣ]	𐡢	ܓ	𐫃		𐫄		𐼲	𐰱 𐰲	𐽲	ג		𐣢	𐭂	𐭢	𐾳	𐢄	ج	𐿢	ࡂ	𐨒	𑀕	𐤂	
Dālaṯ*	𐡃	hard: d soft: ḏ (also dh, ð, δ)	hard: [d] soft: [ð]	𐡣	ܕ	𐫅					𐰓		ד		𐣣	𐭃	𐭣	𐾴	𐢅	ذ د	𐿣	ࡃ	𐨢	𑀤, 𑀥, 𑀟, 𑀠	𐤃	
Hē*	𐡄	h	[h]	𐡤	ܗ	𐫆				𐼳			ה		𐣤	𐭄	𐭤	𐾵	𐢆 𐢇	ه	𐿤	ࡄ	𐨱	𑀳	𐤄	
Waw*	𐡅	consonant: w mater lectionis: ū or ō (also u or o)	consonant: [w] mater lectionis: [u] or [o]	𐡥	ܘ	𐫇		𐫈		𐼴	𐰆 𐰈	𐽳	ו		𐣥	𐭅	𐭥	𐾶 𐾷	𐢈	و	𐿥	ࡅ	𐨬	𑀯, 𑀉, 𑀊, 𑀒, 𑀑	𐤅	
Zayn*	𐡆	z	[z]	𐡦	ܙ	𐫉	𐫊	𐫋	𐫌	𐼵	𐰕	𐽴	ז		𐣦	𐭆	𐭦	𐾸	𐢉	ز	𐿦	ࡆ	𐨗	𑀚	𐤆	
Ḥēṯ	𐡇	ḥ	[ħ], [x], or [χ]	𐡧	ܚ	𐫍				𐼶		𐽲 𐽵	ח		𐣧	𐭇	𐭧	𐾹	𐢊	خ ح	𐿧	ࡇ	𐨓	𑀖	𐤇	
Ṭēṯ	𐡈	ṭ	[tˤ]	𐡨	ܛ	𐫎					𐱃		ט		𐣨	𐭈	𐭨		𐢋	ظ ط	𐿨	ࡈ	𐨠	𑀣, 𑀝, 𑀞	𐤈	Proto-semiticTet-01
Yōḏ	𐡉	consonant: y mater lectionis: ī (also i)	consonant: [j] mater lectionis: [i] or [e]	𐡩	ܝ	𐫏				𐼷	𐰖 𐰃 𐰘	𐽶	י		𐣩	𐭉	𐭩	𐾺	𐢌 𐢍	ي	𐿩	ࡉ	𐨩	𑀬	𐤉	Proto-semiticI-01
Kāp̄	𐡊	hard: k soft: ḵ (also kh, x)	hard: [k] soft: [x]	𐡪	ܟ	𐫐		𐫑	𐫒	𐼸	𐰜 𐰚	𐽷	ך כ		𐣪	𐭊	𐭪	𐾻	𐢎 𐢏	ك	𐿪	ࡊ	𐨐	𑀓	𐤊	
Lāmaḏ	𐡋	l	[l]	𐡫	ܠ	𐫓		𐫔	𐫕	𐼹	𐰠 𐰞	𐽸	ל		𐣫	𐭋	𐭫	𐾼	𐢐 𐢑	ل	𐿫	ࡋ	𐨫	𑀮	𐤋	
Mīm	𐡌	m	[m]	𐡬	ܡ	𐫖				𐼺	𐰢	𐽹	ם מ		𐣬	𐭌	𐭬	𐾽	𐢒 𐢓	م	𐿬	ࡌ	𐨨	𑀫	𐤌	
Nūn	𐡍	n	[n]	𐡭 𐡮	ܢ	𐫗				𐼻	𐰣 𐰤	𐽺	ן נ		𐣭	𐭍	𐭭	𐾾	𐢔 𐢕	ن	𐿭	ࡍ	𐨣	𑀦	𐤍	
Semkaṯ	𐡎	s	[s]	𐡯	ܣ	𐫘				𐼼	𐰾	𐽻	ס		𐣮	𐭎	𐭮	𐾿	𐢖	ﺱ	𐿮	ࡎ	𐨭	𑀱	𐤎	Proto-semiticX-01
ʿĒ	𐡏	ʿ	[ʕ]	𐡰	ܥ	𐫙		𐫚		𐼽	𐰍 𐰏		ע		𐣯	𐭏	𐭥	𐿀	𐢗	غ ع	𐿯	ࡏ	𐨀𐨅	𑀏, 𑀐, 𑀇, 𑀈	𐤏	Proto-semiticO-01
Pē	𐡐	hard: p soft: p̄ (also p̱, ᵽ, ph, f)	hard: [p] soft: [f]	𐡱	ܦ	𐫛		𐫜		𐼾	𐰯	𐽼	ף פ		𐣰	𐭐	𐭯	𐿁	𐢘	ف	𐿰	ࡐ	𐨤	𑀧, 𑀨	𐤐	
Ṣāḏē*	𐡑	ṣ	[sˤ]	𐡲	ܨ	𐫝				𐼿	𐰽	𐽽	ץ צ		𐣱	𐭑	𐭰		𐢙	ض ص	𐿱	ࡑ	𐨯	𑀲	𐤑	Proto-semiticTsade-02
Qōp̄	𐡒	q	[q]	𐡳	ܩ	𐫞		𐫟	𐫠		𐰸 𐰴		ק		𐣲	𐭒	𐭬		𐢚	ق	𐿲	ࡒ	𐨑	𑀔	𐤒	
Rēš*	𐡓	r	[r]	𐡴	ܪ	𐫡				𐽀	𐰼 𐰺	𐽾	ר		𐣣	𐭓	𐭥	𐿂	𐢛	ر	𐿳	ࡓ	𐨪	𑀭	𐤓	
Šīn	𐡔	š (also sh)	[ʃ]	𐡵	ܫ	𐫢		𐫣		𐽁	𐱁 𐱂	𐽿	ש		𐣴	𐭔	𐭱	𐿃	𐢜 𐢝	ش	𐿴	ࡔ	𐨮	𑀰	𐤔	
Taw*	𐡕	hard: t soft: ṯ (also th, θ)	hard: [t] soft: [θ]	𐡶	ܬ	𐫤				𐽂	𐱅	𐾀	ת		𐣵	𐭕	𐭲	𐿄	𐢞	ث ت	𐿵	ࡕ	𐨟	𑀢	𐤕	

== Unicode ==
The Imperial Aramaic alphabet was added to the Unicode Standard in October 2009, with the release of version 5.2.

The Unicode block for Imperial Aramaic is U+10840–U+1085F:

Imperial Aramaic^{[1]}^{[2]} Official Unicode Consortium code chart (PDF)
	0	1	2	3	4	5	6	7	8	9	A	B	C	D	E	F
U+1084x	𐡀	𐡁	𐡂	𐡃	𐡄	𐡅	𐡆	𐡇	𐡈	𐡉	𐡊	𐡋	𐡌	𐡍	𐡎	𐡏
U+1085x	𐡐	𐡑	𐡒	𐡓	𐡔	𐡕		𐡗	𐡘	𐡙	𐡚	𐡛	𐡜	𐡝	𐡞	𐡟
Notes 1.As of Unicode version 18.0 2.Grey area indicates non-assigned code point

The Syriac Aramaic alphabet was added to the Unicode Standard in September 1999, with the release of version 3.0.

The Syriac Abbreviation (a type of overline) can be represented with a special control character called the Syriac Abbreviation Mark (U+070F). The Unicode block for Syriac Aramaic is U+0700–U+074F:

Syriac^{[1]}^{[2]} Official Unicode Consortium code chart (PDF)
	0	1	2	3	4	5	6	7	8	9	A	B	C	D	E	F
U+070x	܀	܁	܂	܃	܄	܅	܆	܇	܈	܉	܊	܋	܌	܍		SAM
U+071x	ܐ	ܑ	ܒ	ܓ	ܔ	ܕ	ܖ	ܗ	ܘ	ܙ	ܚ	ܛ	ܜ	ܝ	ܞ	ܟ
U+072x	ܠ	ܡ	ܢ	ܣ	ܤ	ܥ	ܦ	ܧ	ܨ	ܩ	ܪ	ܫ	ܬ	ܭ	ܮ	ܯ
U+073x	ܰ	ܱ	ܲ	ܳ	ܴ	ܵ	ܶ	ܷ	ܸ	ܹ	ܺ	ܻ	ܼ	ܽ	ܾ	ܿ
U+074x	݀	݁	݂	݃	݄	݅	݆	݇	݈	݉	݊			ݍ	ݎ	ݏ
Notes 1.As of Unicode version 18.0 2.Grey areas indicate non-assigned code points

== See also ==
- Syriac alphabet
- Mandaic alphabet

== Sources ==
- Byrne, Ryan. "Middle Aramaic Scripts". Encyclopaedia of Language and Linguistics. Elsevier. (2006)
- Daniels, Peter T., et al. eds. The World's Writing Systems. Oxford. (1996)
- Coulmas, Florian. The Writing Systems of the World. Blackwell Publishers Ltd, Oxford. (1989)
- Rudder, Joshua. Learn to Write Aramaic: A Step-by-Step Approach to the Historical & Modern Scripts. n.p.: CreateSpace Independent Publishing Platform, 2011. 220 pp. ISBN 978-1461021421. Includes a wide variety of Aramaic scripts.
- Ancient Hebrew and Aramaic on Coins, reading and transliterating Proto-Hebrew, online edition (Judaea Coin Archive).
