= Elymaic (Unicode block) =

- Range: U+10FE0..U+10FFF (32 code points)
- Plane: SMP
- Scripts: Elymaic
- Assigned: 23 code points
- Unused: 9 reserved code points

Unicode version history
- 12.0 (2019): 23 (+23)

Unicode documentation
- Code chart ∣ Web page

Elymaic is a Unicode block containing characters for the Elymaic alphabet, used in the ancient state of Elymais.

Elymaic^{[1]}^{[2]} Official Unicode Consortium code chart (PDF)
	0	1	2	3	4	5	6	7	8	9	A	B	C	D	E	F
U+10FEx	𐿠	𐿡	𐿢	𐿣	𐿤	𐿥	𐿦	𐿧	𐿨	𐿩	𐿪	𐿫	𐿬	𐿭	𐿮	𐿯
U+10FFx	𐿰	𐿱	𐿲	𐿳	𐿴	𐿵	𐿶									
Notes: 1. As of Unicode version 16.0; 2. Grey areas indicate non-assigned code points

== History ==
The following Unicode-related documents record the purpose and process of defining specific characters in the Elymaic block:

Version	Final code points (Note: Proposed code points and characters names may differ from final code points and names)	Count	L2 ID	WG2 ID	Document
12.0	U+10FE0..10FF6	23	L2/17-055		Pandey, Anshuman (2017-02-01), Preliminary proposal to encode the Elymaic script
12.0	U+10FE0..10FF6	23	L2/17-255		Anderson, Deborah; Whistler, Ken; Pournader, Roozbeh; Moore, Lisa; Liang, Hai (2017-07-28), "5. Elymaean", Recommendations to UTC #152 July-August 2017 on Script Proposals
12.0	U+10FE0..10FF6	23	L2/17-384		Anderson, Deborah; Whistler, Ken; Pournader, Roozbeh; Moore, Lisa; Liang, Hai (2017-10-22), "6. Elymaic", Recommendations to UTC #153 October 2017 on Script Proposals
12.0	U+10FE0..10FF6	23	L2/17-226R2	N4916	Pandey, Anshuman (2017-10-23), Proposal to encode the Elymaic script in Unicode (revised)
12.0	U+10FE0..10FF6	23	L2/17-362		Moore, Lisa (2018-02-02), "Consensus 153-C29", UTC #153 Minutes
12.0	U+10FE0..10FF6	23		N5020 (pdf, doc)	Umamaheswaran, V. S. (2019-01-11), "7.4.3", Unconfirmed minutes of WG 2 meeting 67
