= Palmyrene (Unicode block) =

- Range: U+10860..U+1087F (32 code points)
- Plane: SMP
- Scripts: Palmyrene
- Major alphabets: Palmyrene
- Assigned: 32 code points
- Unused: 0 reserved code points

Unicode version history
- 7.0 (2014): 32 (+32)

Unicode documentation
- Code chart ∣ Web page

Palmyrene is a Unicode block containing characters for the historical Palmyrene alphabet used to write the local Palmyrene dialect of Aramaic.

Palmyrene^{[1]} Official Unicode Consortium code chart (PDF)
	0	1	2	3	4	5	6	7	8	9	A	B	C	D	E	F
U+1086x	𐡠	𐡡	𐡢	𐡣	𐡤	𐡥	𐡦	𐡧	𐡨	𐡩	𐡪	𐡫	𐡬	𐡭	𐡮	𐡯
U+1087x	𐡰	𐡱	𐡲	𐡳	𐡴	𐡵	𐡶	𐡷	𐡸	𐡹	𐡺	𐡻	𐡼	𐡽	𐡾	𐡿
Notes: 1. As of Unicode version 16.0

== History ==
The following Unicode-related documents record the purpose and process of defining specific characters in the Palmyrene block:

Version	Final code points (Note: Proposed code points and characters names may differ from final code points and names)	Count	L2 ID	WG2 ID	Document
7.0	U+10860..1087F	32	L2/10-003	N3749	Everson, Michael (2010-01-21), Preliminary proposal for encoding the Palmyrene script in the SMP of the UCS
7.0	U+10860..1087F	32	L2/10-255R2	N3867R2	Everson, Michael (2010-07-29), Proposal for encoding the Palmyrene script in the SMP of the UCS
7.0	U+10860..1087F	32	L2/10-221		Moore, Lisa (2010-08-23), "C.16", UTC #124 / L2 #221 Minutes
7.0	U+10860..1087F	32		N3903 (pdf, doc)	"M57.18", Unconfirmed minutes of WG2 meeting 57, 2011-03-31
