= Imperial Aramaic (Unicode block) =

- Range: U+10840..U+1085F (32 code points)
- Plane: SMP
- Scripts: Imperial Aramaic
- Major alphabets: Aramaic
- Assigned: 31 code points
- Unused: 1 reserved code points

Unicode version history
- 5.2 (2009): 31 (+31)

Unicode documentation
- Code chart ∣ Web page

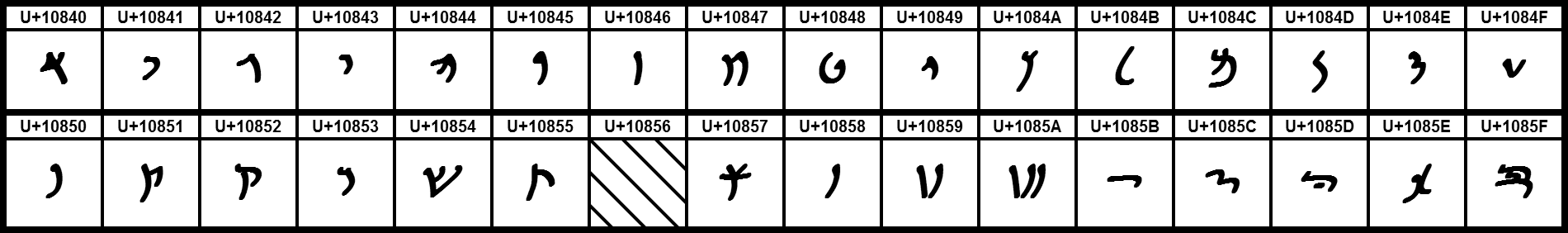
Graphical representation of the Imperial Aramaic Unicode block. Hatched boxes indicate non-assigned code points.

Imperial Aramaic is a Unicode block containing characters for writing Aramaic during the Neo-Assyrian and Achaemenid Empires.

Imperial Aramaic^{[1]}^{[2]} Official Unicode Consortium code chart (PDF)
	0	1	2	3	4	5	6	7	8	9	A	B	C	D	E	F
U+1084x	𐡀	𐡁	𐡂	𐡃	𐡄	𐡅	𐡆	𐡇	𐡈	𐡉	𐡊	𐡋	𐡌	𐡍	𐡎	𐡏
U+1085x	𐡐	𐡑	𐡒	𐡓	𐡔	𐡕		𐡗	𐡘	𐡙	𐡚	𐡛	𐡜	𐡝	𐡞	𐡟
Notes: 1. As of Unicode version 17.0; 2. Grey area indicates non-assigned code point

== History ==
The following Unicode-related documents record the purpose and process of defining specific characters in the Imperial Aramaic block:

Version	Final code points (Note: Proposed code points and characters names may differ from final code points and names)	Count	L2 ID	WG2 ID	Document
5.2	U+10840..10855, 10857..1085F	31	L2/03-455		Kirk, Peter (2003-12-22), Error Report
5.2	U+10840..10855, 10857..1085F	31		N3353 (pdf, doc)	Umamaheswaran, V. S. (2007-10-10), "M51.13", Unconfirmed minutes of WG 2 meeting 51 Hanzhou, China; 2007-04-24/27
5.2	U+10840..10855, 10857..1085F	31	L2/07-197R2	N3273R2	Everson, Michael (2007-07-25), Preliminary proposal for encoding the Imperial Aramaic script in the SMP of the UCS
5.2	U+10840..10855, 10857..1085F	31	L2/07-236		Anderson, Deborah (2007-07-29), Comments in support of encoding Imperial Aramaic (proposal L2/07-197R2)
5.2	U+10840..10855, 10857..1085F	31	L2/07-225		Moore, Lisa (2007-08-21), "Imperial Aramaic Script", UTC #112 Minutes
5.2	U+10840..10855, 10857..1085F	31	L2/07-288	N3339	Everson, Michael (2007-08-25), Proposal for encoding the Imperial Aramaic script in the SMP of the UCS
5.2	U+10840..10855, 10857..1085F	31	L2/09-066R		Anderson, Deborah (2009-01-29), 10857 Imperial Aramaic Section Sign
5.2	U+10840..10855, 10857..1085F	31	L2/09-003R		Moore, Lisa (2009-02-12), "B.15.2", UTC #118 / L2 #215 Minutes
