= Damascene =

Damascene may refer to:

- Topics directly associated with the city of Damascus in Syria:
  - A native or inhabitant of Damascus
  - Damascena, the territory around Damascus in Roman and Byzantine Syria
  - Damascus Arabic, the local dialect of Damascus
  - Damascus steel, developed for swordmaking
  - "Damascene moment", the religious conversion of Paul
- Animal breeds:
  - Damascene (pigeon)
  - Damascus goat
- John of Damascus (c. 676-749), Syrian Christian monk and priest
- Materials technologies evoking the visual texture of Damascus steel:
  - Damascening, of inlaying different metals into one another
  - Damask, a reversible figured fabric
  - Damascene patterning, a manufacturing process used to pattern copper into microchips
