= Palmyrene alphabet =

Historical Middle Eastern alphabet

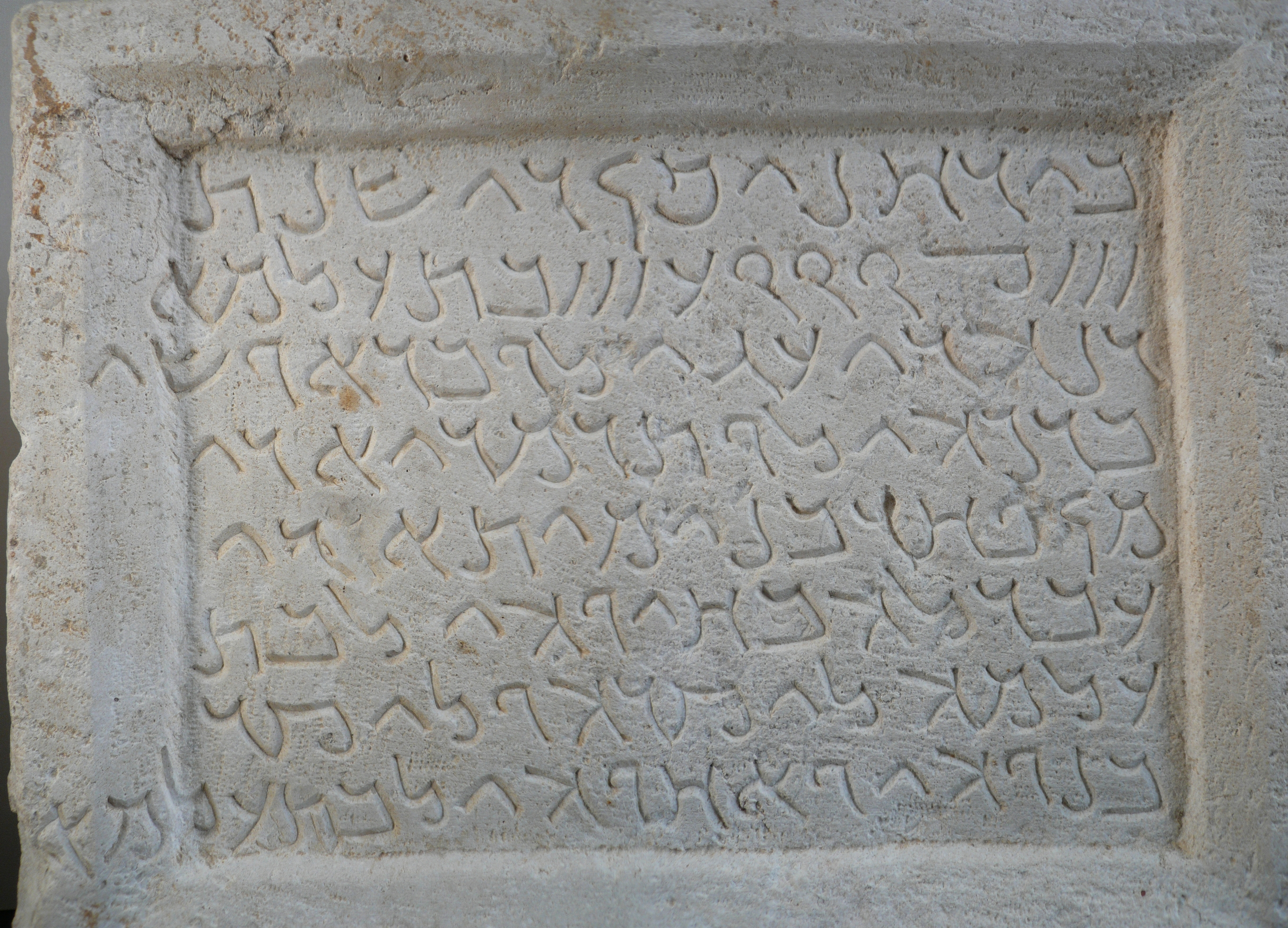
- Palmyrene inscription in the Louvre
- Script type: Abjad
- Period: 100 BCE to 300 CE
- Direction: Right-to-left script
- Languages: Palmyrene Aramaic

Related scripts
- Parent systems: Proto-Sinaitic alphabet: Phoenician alphabet; Aramaic alphabet; Palmyrene alphabet
- Child systems: Syriac; Manichaean
- Sister systems: Ammonite; Brāhmī; Hatran; Elymaic; Hebrew; Mandaic; Nabataean; Pahlavi; Parthian

ISO 15924
- ISO 15924: Palm (126), Palmyrene

Unicode
- Unicode alias: Palmyrene
- Unicode range: U+10860–U+1087F; Final Accepted Script Proposal

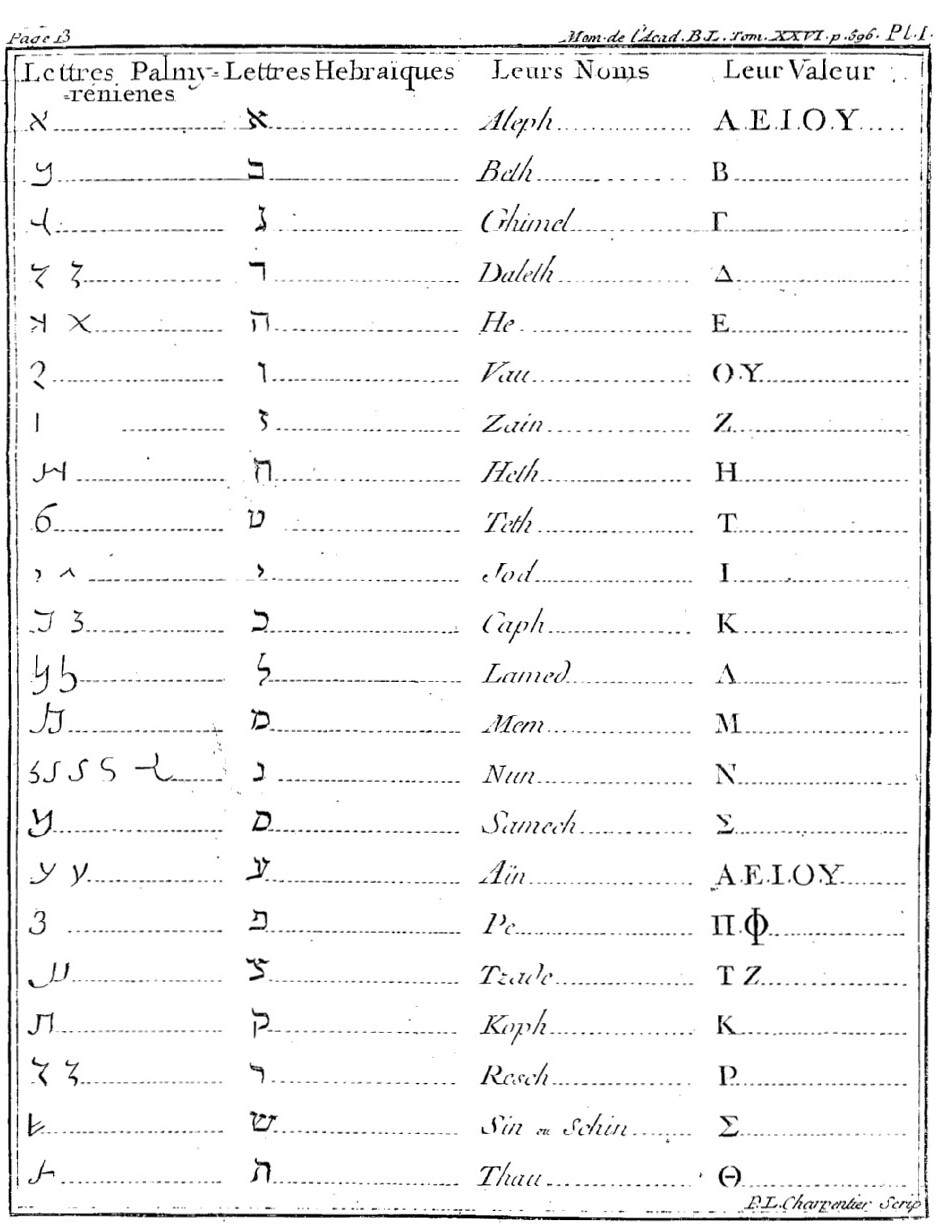
Palmyrene alphabet by Jean-Jacques Barthélemy, 1754

The Palmyrene alphabet was a historical Semitic alphabet used to write Palmyrene Aramaic. It was used between 100 BCE and 300 CE in Palmyra in the Syrian desert. It is known from the over 3,000 Palmyrene inscriptions discovered in modern times. The oldest surviving Palmyrene inscription dates to 44 BCE. The last surviving inscription dates to 274 CE, two years after Palmyra was sacked by Roman Emperor Aurelian, ending the Palmyrene Empire. Use of the Palmyrene language and script declined, being replaced with Greek and Latin.

The Palmyrene alphabet was derived from cursive versions of the Aramaic alphabet and shares many of its characteristics:

- Twenty-two letters with only consonants represented
- Written horizontally from right-to-left
- Numbers written right-to-left using a non-decimal system

Palmyrene was normally written without spaces or punctuation between words and sentences (scriptio continua style).

Two forms of the Palmyrene alphabet were developed: The rounded, cursive form derived from the Aramaic alphabet and later a decorative, monumental form developed from the cursive Palmyrene. Both the cursive and monumental forms commonly used orthographic ligatures.

== Characters ==
=== Numbers ===
Palmyrene used a non-positional system which built up numbers using combinations of their symbols for 1, 2, 3, 4, 5, 10, and 20. It is similar to the system used for Aramaic which built numbers using their symbols for 1, 2, 3, 10, 20, 100, 1000, and 10000.

=== Letters ===
There are some styles in which the 'r'-letter (resh) is the same as the 'd'-letter (dalesh) with a dot on top, but there are styles in which the two letters are visually distinct. Ligation, after b, ḥ, m, n, and q before some other consonants was common in some inscriptions but was not obligatory. There are also two fleurons (left-sided and right-sided) that tend to appear near numbers.

Name	Letter		Sound Value		Imperial Aramaic Equivalent	Syriac Equivalent	Manichaean Equivalent				Phoenician Equivalent	Hebrew Equivalent	Arabic Equivalent
Name	Inscription Form		Transliteration	IPA	Imperial Aramaic Equivalent	Syriac Equivalent	Manichaean Equivalent				Phoenician Equivalent	Hebrew Equivalent	Arabic Equivalent
ʾĀlap̄*	𐡠		ʾ or nothing	[ʔ] or silent	𐡀	ܐ	𐫀				𐤀	א	ا
Bēṯ	𐡡		hard: b soft: ḇ (also bh, v, β)	hard: [b] soft: [v] or [w]	𐡁	ܒ	𐫁		𐫂		𐤁	ב	ب
Gāmal	𐡢		hard: g soft: ḡ (also g̱, gh, ġ, γ)	hard: [ɡ] soft: [ɣ]	𐡂	ܓ	𐫃		𐫄		𐤂	ג	ج
Dālaṯ*	𐡣		hard: d soft: ḏ (also dh, ð, δ)	hard: [d] soft: [ð]	𐡃	ܕ	𐫅				𐤃	ד	د, ذ
Hē*	𐡤		h	[h]	𐡄	ܗ	𐫆				𐤄	ה	ه
Waw*	𐡥		consonant: w mater lectionis: ū or ō (also u or o)	consonant: [w] mater lectionis: [u] or [o]	𐡅	ܘ	𐫇		𐫈		𐤅	ו	و
Zayn*	𐡦		z	[z]	𐡆	ܙ	𐫉	𐫊	𐫋	𐫌	𐤆	ז	ز
Ḥēṯ	𐡧		ḥ	[ħ], [x], or [χ]	𐡇	ܚ	𐫍				𐤇	ח	ح, خ
Ṭēṯ	𐡨		ṭ	[tˤ]	𐡈	ܛ	𐫎				𐤈	ט	ط, ظ
Yōḏ	𐡩		consonant: y mater lectionis: ī (also i)	consonant: [j] mater lectionis: [i] or [e]	𐡉	ܝ	𐫏				𐤉	י	ي
Kāp̄	𐡪		hard: k soft: ḵ (also kh, x)	hard: [k] soft: [x]	𐡊	ܟ	𐫐		𐫑	𐫒	𐤊	כ, ך	ك
Lāmaḏ	𐡫		l	[l]	𐡋	ܠ	𐫓		𐫔	𐫕	𐤋	ל	ل
Mīm	𐡬		m	[m]	𐡌	ܡ	𐫖				𐤌	מ, ם	م
Nūn	𐡭 (final)	𐡮	n	[n]	𐡍	ܢ	𐫗				𐤍	נ, ן	ن
Semkaṯ	𐡯		s	[s]	𐡎	ܣ	𐫘				𐤎	ס	
ʿĒ	𐡰		ʿ	[ʕ]	𐡏	ܥ	𐫙		𐫚		𐤏	ע	ع, غ
Pē	𐡱		hard: p soft: p̄ (also p̱, ᵽ, ph, f)	hard: [p] soft: [f]	𐡐	ܦ	𐫛		𐫜		𐤐	פ, ף	ف
Ṣāḏē*	𐡲		ṣ	[sˤ]	𐡑	ܨ	𐫝				𐤑	צ, ץ	ص, ض
Qōp̄	𐡳		q	[q]	𐡒	ܩ	𐫞		𐫟	𐫠	𐤒	ק	ق
Rēš*	𐡴		r	[r]	𐡓	ܪ	𐫡				𐤓	ר	ر
Šīn	𐡵		š (also sh)	[ʃ]	𐡔	ܫ	𐫢		𐫣		𐤔	ש	س, ش
Taw*	𐡶		hard: t soft: ṯ (also th, θ)	hard: [t] soft: [θ]	𐡕	ܬ	𐫤				𐤕	ת	ت, ث

== Decipherment ==
Examples of Palmyrene inscriptions were printed as far back as 1616, but accurate copies of Palmyrene/Greek bilingual inscriptions were not available until 1753. The Palmyrene alphabet was deciphered in 1754, literally overnight, by Abbé Jean-Jacques Barthélemy using these new, accurate copies of bilingual inscriptions.

== Unicode ==
Palmyrene was added to the Unicode Standard in June, 2014 with the release of version 7.0.

The Unicode block for Palmyrene is U+10860–U+1087F:

Palmyrene^{[1]} Official Unicode Consortium code chart (PDF)
	0	1	2	3	4	5	6	7	8	9	A	B	C	D	E	F
U+1086x	𐡠	𐡡	𐡢	𐡣	𐡤	𐡥	𐡦	𐡧	𐡨	𐡩	𐡪	𐡫	𐡬	𐡭	𐡮	𐡯
U+1087x	𐡰	𐡱	𐡲	𐡳	𐡴	𐡵	𐡶	𐡷	𐡸	𐡹	𐡺	𐡻	𐡼	𐡽	𐡾	𐡿
Notes 1.As of Unicode version 17.0

== Gallery ==
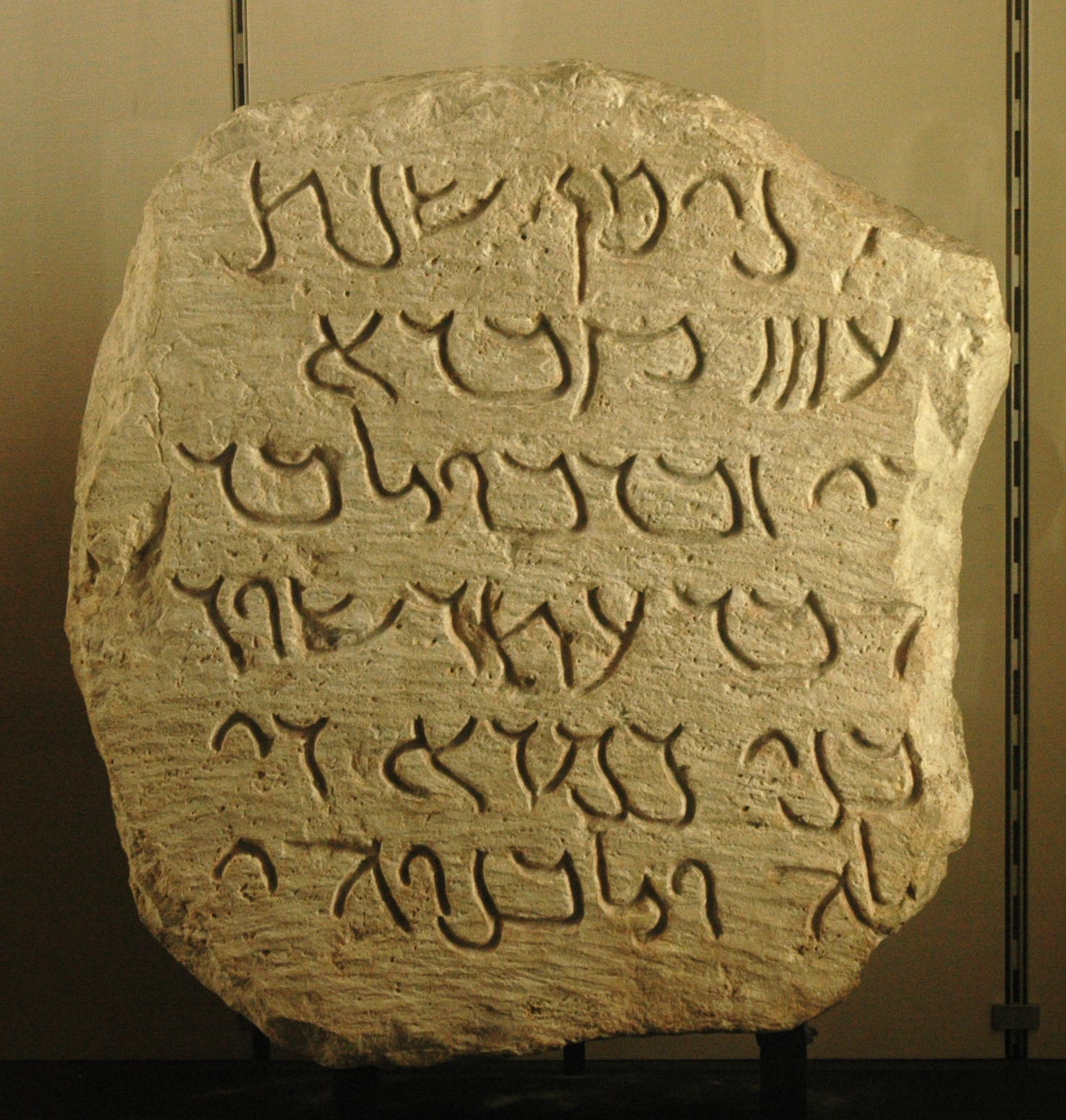
Funerary slabstone bearing a Palmyrene inscription (Musée du Louvre)

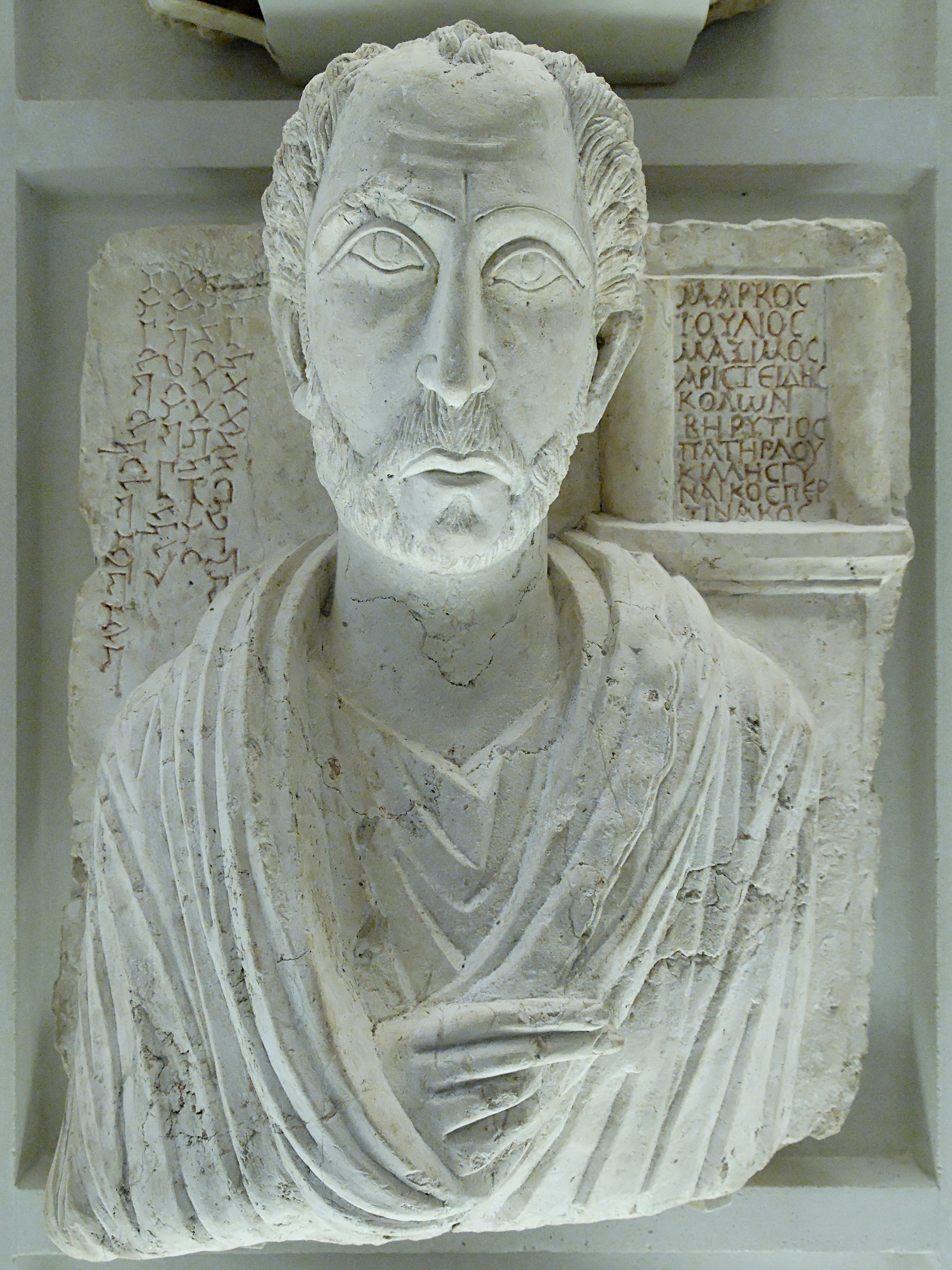
Relief with Palmyrene/Greek bilingual inscription (Musée du Louvre)

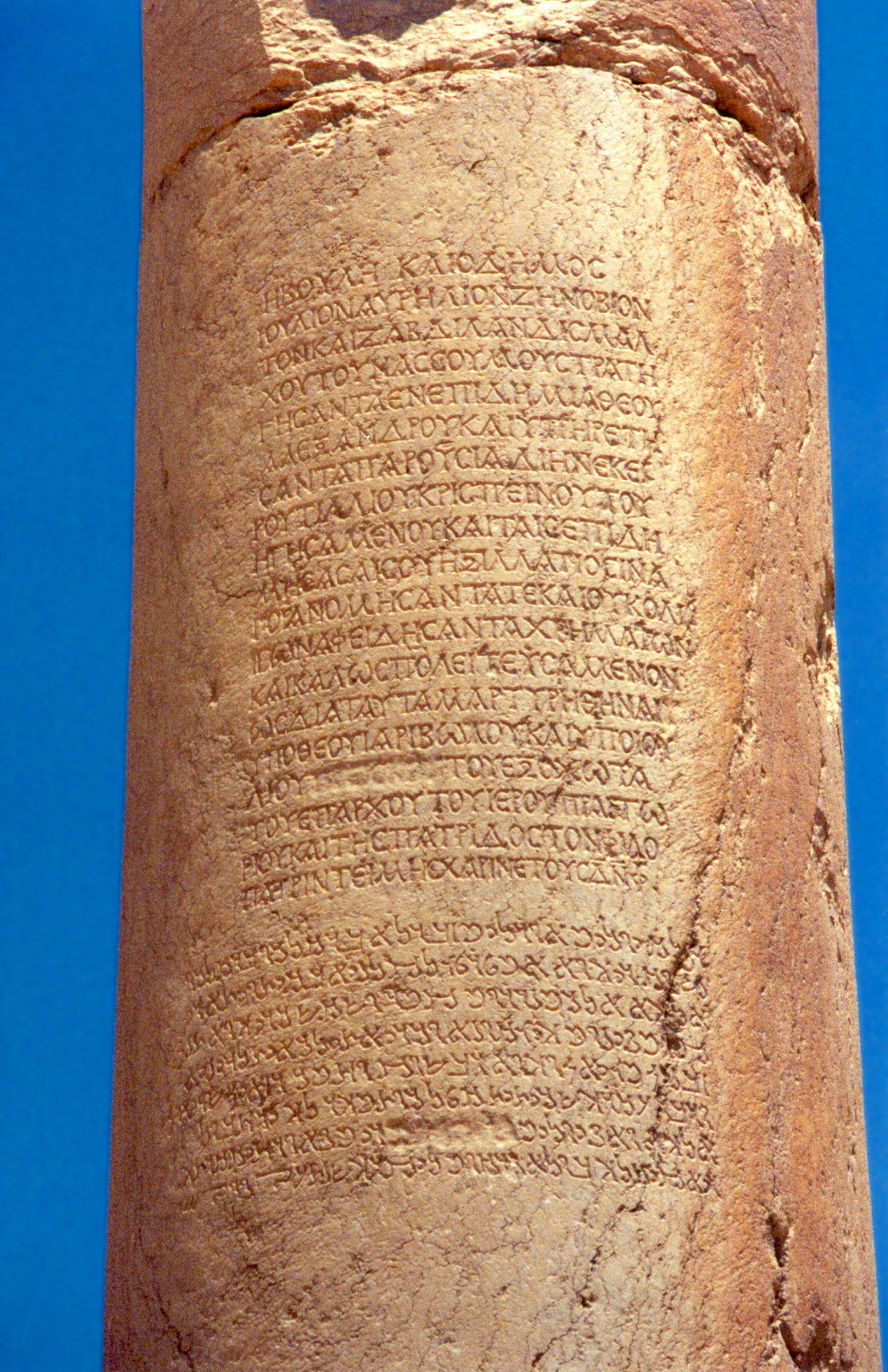
Column at Palmyra with Palmyrene/Greek bilingual inscription in honor of Julius Aurelius Zenobius

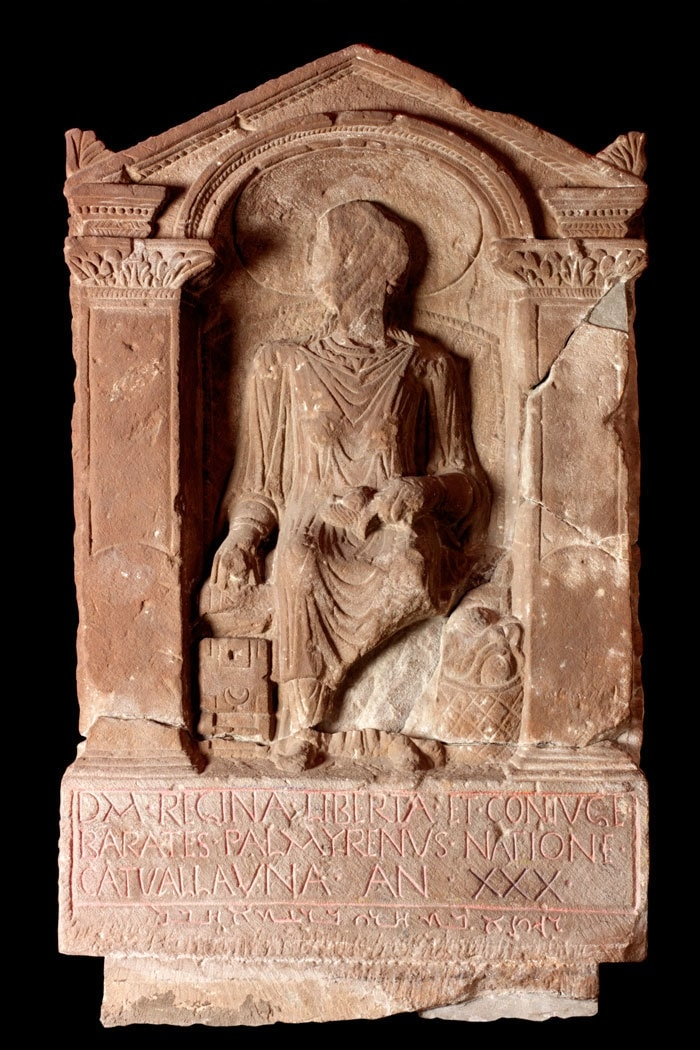
Tombstone from Arbeia with a bilingual epitaph.
