= Florian Coulmas =

German linguist and author (born 1949)

- Born: 5 June 1949 (age 77)
- Education: Freie Universität Berlin; Sorbonne; Düsseldorf University
- Occupations: Linguist and author
- Employer: University of Duisburg-Essen
- Awards: Meyer-Struckmann-Prize

Florian Coulmas (born 5 June 1949 in Hamburg) is a German linguist and author. He is Senior Professor for Japanese Society and Sociolinguistics at the University of Duisburg-Essen.

From 1968 to 1975, Florian Coulmas studied Sociology, Philosophy, and German Studies at Freie Universität Berlin and at Paris Sorbonne (1969–1970). He completed his PhD at Bielefeld University in 1977. In 1980, he finished his habilitation at Düsseldorf University, where he worked as a privatdozent thereafter. In 1987, he became Professor of Sociolinguistics at Chūō University.

Currently, Coulmas is Professor of Language and Culture of Modern Japan at the University of Duisburg-Essen. From October 2004 until September 2014, he was the Director of the German Institute for Japanese Studies in Tokyo. Coulmas lived in Japan for many years. He has published on Grapholinguistics, Sociology of language, and Japanology. He regularly writes for the Japan Times, the Frankfurter Allgemeine Zeitung, and the Neue Zürcher Zeitung.

In 2016, Coulmas was awarded the Meyer-Struckmann-Prize for Research in Arts and Social Sciences.

== Select bibliography ==
- Florian Coulmas (1986). Direct and Indirect Speech. Walter de Gruyter. ISBN 978-3-11-010599-5.
- Florian Coulmas (2003). Writing Systems: An Introduction to Their Linguistic Analysis. Cambridge University Press. ISBN 978-0-521-78737-6.
- Florian Coulmas (2007). Population Decline and Ageing in Japan - The Social Consequences. Routledge. ISBN 978-1-134-14501-0.
- Florian Coulmas (2013). Sociolinguistics: The Study of Speakers' Choices. Cambridge University Press. ISBN 978-1-107-03764-9.
