= Elymaic =

Writing system

Elymaic alphabet
- Script type: Abjad
- Period: 2nd century BCE — early 3rd century CE
- Direction: Right-to-left script
- Languages: Achaemenid Aramaic

Related scripts
- Parent systems: Egyptian hieroglyphs: Proto-Sinaitic script; Phoenician alphabet; Aramaic alphabet; Elymaic alphabet

ISO 15924
- ISO 15924: Elym (128), Elymaic

Unicode
- Unicode alias: Elymaic
- Unicode range: U+10FE0–U+10FFF

The Elymaic alphabet is a right-to-left, non-joining abjad. It is derived from the Aramaic alphabet. Elymaic was used in the ancient state of Elymais, which was a semi-independent state of the 2nd century BCE to the early 3rd century CE, frequently a vassal under Parthian control, in the present-day region of Khuzestan, Iran (Susiana).

== Unicode ==
The Elymaic alphabet was added to the Unicode Standard in March, 2019 with the release of version 12.0.

The Unicode block for Elymaic is U+10FE0–U+10FFF:

Elymaic^{[1]}^{[2]} Official Unicode Consortium code chart (PDF)
	0	1	2	3	4	5	6	7	8	9	A	B	C	D	E	F
U+10FEx	𐿠	𐿡	𐿢	𐿣	𐿤	𐿥	𐿦	𐿧	𐿨	𐿩	𐿪	𐿫	𐿬	𐿭	𐿮	𐿯
U+10FFx	𐿰	𐿱	𐿲	𐿳	𐿴	𐿵	𐿶									
Notes: 1. As of Unicode version 17.0; 2. Grey areas indicate non-assigned code points
