= Damascene pigeon =

Breed of pigeon

Damascene
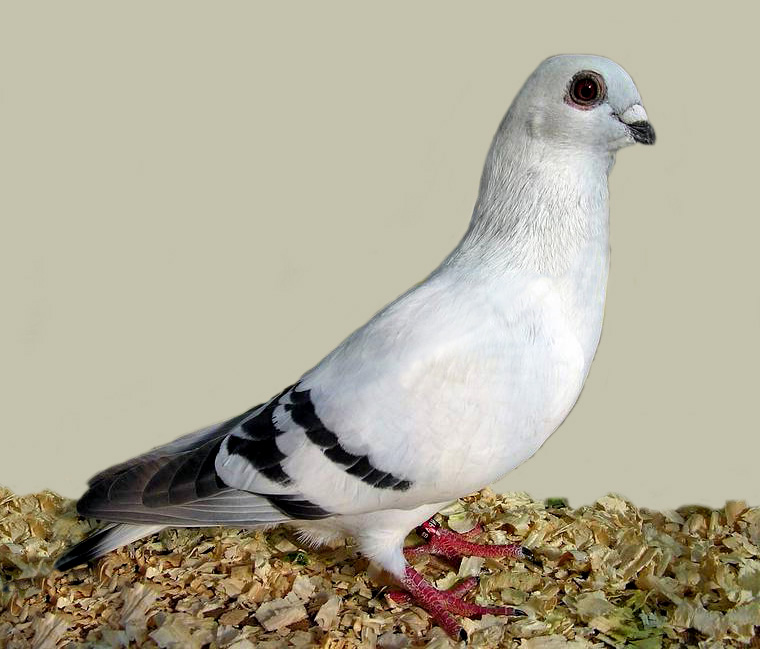
- Barred Damascene
- Conservation status: Common
- Country of origin: Middle East

Classification
- Australian Breed Group: Group 4
- US Breed Group: Syrian
- EE Breed Group: Formentauben

Notes
- An old breed mentioned in some of the oldest literature regarding domesticated pigeons.

The Damascene, also known as the Istanbullu pigeon, is a breed of fancy pigeon developed over many years of selective breeding. Damascenes, along with other varieties of domesticated pigeons, are all descendants of the rock dove (also called rock pigeon) (Columba livia). The breed is thought to have originated in Damascus, Syria and hence its name. The American Pigeon Standard, notes that it may well have come from Turkey, particularly Smyrna.

== Appearance ==
The Damascene is entirely white or silver-grey, with a black tail tip and wing bars. The under feathers of the neck are dark grey, and so is the skin. The primary flight feathers grow darker towards the tips. The head and breast should have no markings.

Damascenes may also be grouse-legged, with a short layer of feathers covering the legs, but clean legs are preferred by breeders.

== Gallery ==
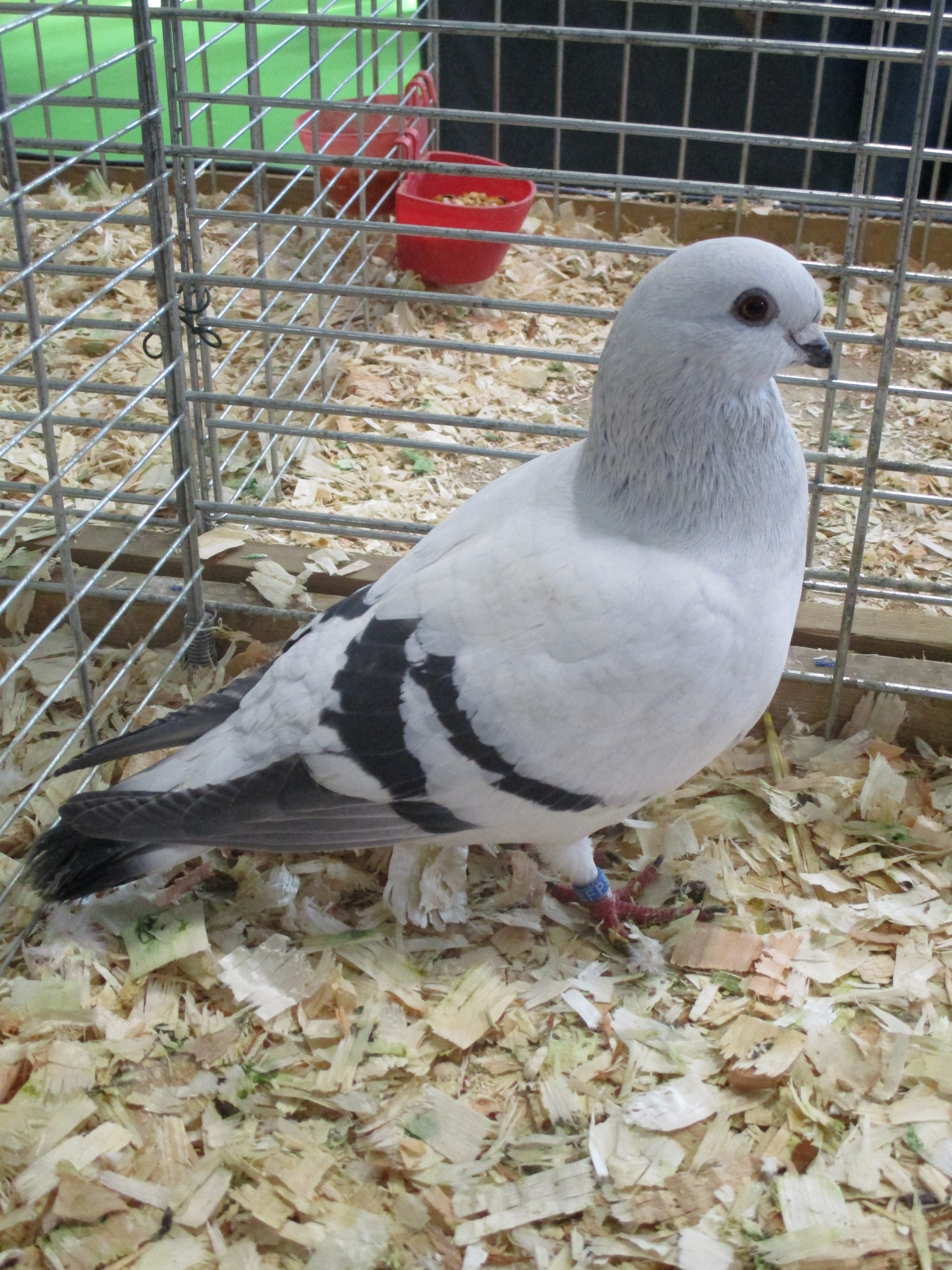

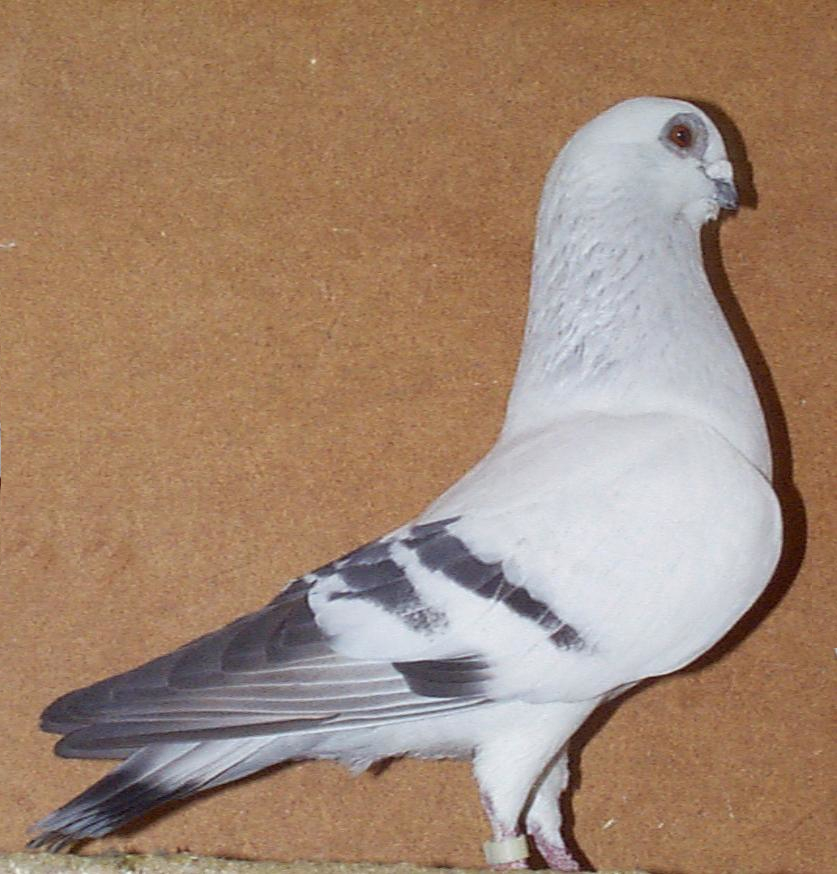

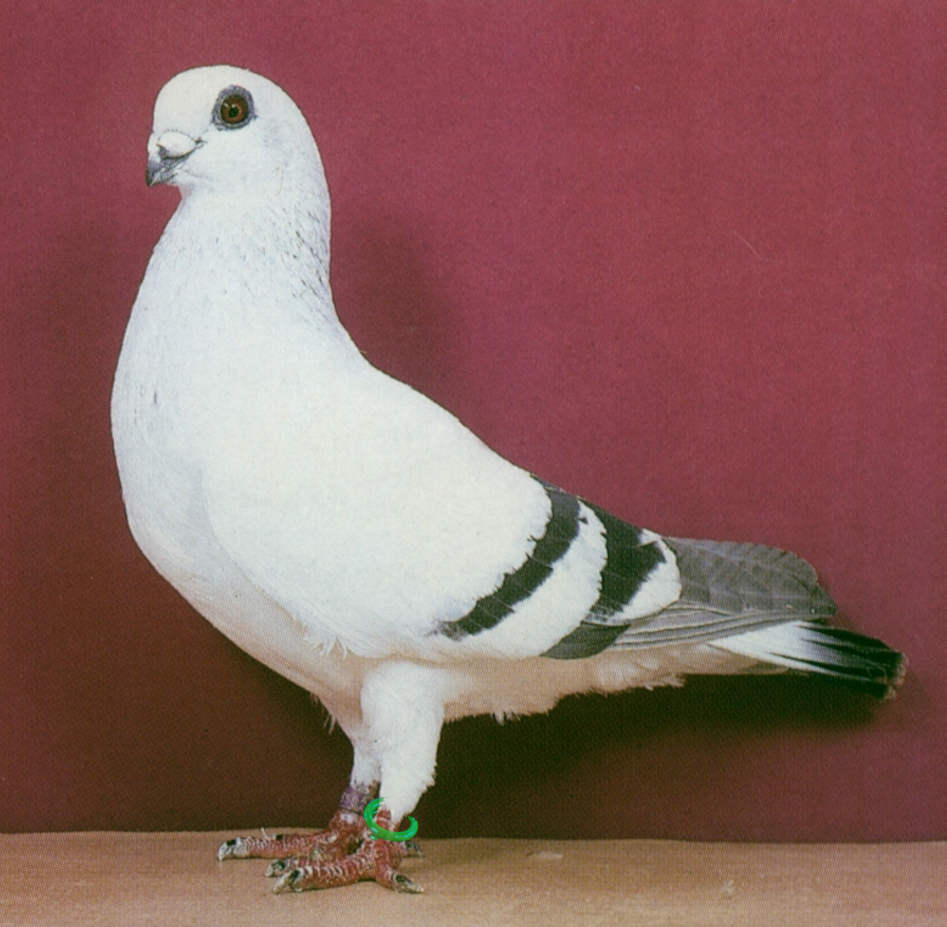

== See also ==
- Media related to Damascene (pigeon) at Wikimedia Commons
- List of pigeon breeds
- Pigeon keeping
  - Pigeon Diet
  - Pigeon Housing
