= Palmyrena =

Ancient region containing Palmyra, Syria

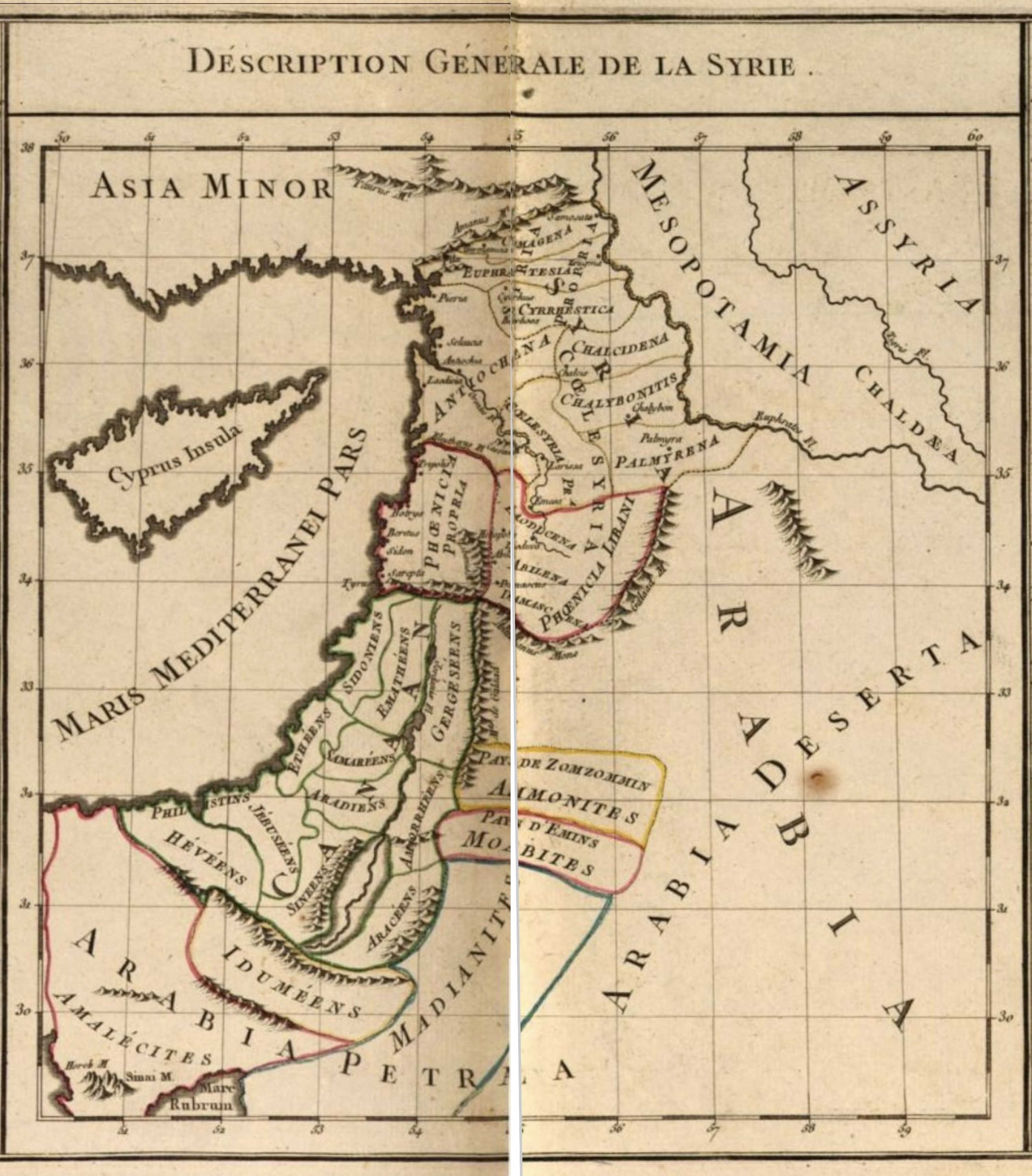
A 1772 map of the ancient Levant showing Palmyrena

Palmyrena or Palmyrene (from Ancient Greek Παλμυρηνή Palmurēnḗ; Latin: Palmyrena, short for Syria Palmyrena, lit. 'Palmyrene Syria' or regio Palmyrena, lit. 'the Palmyrene region'), also referred to as Solitudines Palmyrenae (lit. 'the Palmyrene solitudes') in Latin sources, was the vast region surrounding and controlled from the ancient city of Palmyra, in Syria. Archeological research dedicated to Palmyrena (and not just Palmyra) truly began in the first half of the 20th century, conducted by Alois Musil, Antoine Poidebard and Daniel Schlumberger.

== History ==
Originally inhabited by Arameans who spoke Aramaic, Palmyrena, like all of Aram, was later conquered by the neighboring Neo-Assyrian Empire and afterwards ruled by the Achaemenid Empire. By the 1st century BCE, Palmyra became a client city of the Roman Empire and became part of the Roman province of Syria. In 194 CE, Palmyra became part of Syria Phoenice as a result of the division of Syria by Septimius Severus. In the 3rd century CE, under Queen Zenobia, the city led a short-lived breakaway state known as the Palmyrene Empire, controlling much of the Eastern Mediterranean before being reconquered by Rome.

== Geography ==
Palmyrena encompassed the oasis city of Palmyra and its surrounding desert hinterlands, forming a key stop along trade routes connecting the Mediterranean world with Mesopotamia and the Iranian plateau to the east, and with the Arabian Peninsula to the south. Its location made it an important center of commerce and cultural exchange. Quoting Richard Stoneman,

There is little doubt that Palmyrena was more fertile in classical times that it is now. In the early second century Appian refers to the sand “stretching from Palmyra to the Euphrates,” but the remains of ancient habitations in now barren spots suggest a greater plenitude of water, though there is little evidence of irrigation.

== Boundary markers ==
In 1939, Daniel Schlumberger identified three boundary markers of Palmyrena: two were discovered during excavations at Jabal al-Bilas, marking the northern boundary of Palmyra, although the identity of the neighboring region remains uncertain; the third marker was discovered in 1936 at Qasr al-Hayr al-Gharbi, marking the western boundary, which bordered Emesena.

== Settlements ==
According to Ptolemy (2nd century CE), Palmyrena included the following settlements:

- Resapha
- Cholle
- Oriza
- Putea
- Adada
- Palmyra
- Adacha
- Danaba
- Goaria
- Aueria
- Casama
- Admana
- Atera
- Alalis (on the Euphrates)
- Sura (on the Euphrates)
- Alamantha (on the Euphrates)

== Interaction with Palmyra ==
In his 1951 thesis La Palmyrène du Nord-Ouest, Daniel Schlumberger analyzed the remains of villages in Northwest Palmyrena, shedding light on the interaction between Palmyra and its hinterland. He showed that the image of Palmyra as an isolated city in the middle of the steppe had to be reconsidered. These villages, located in an arid region where only cisterns made habitation possible, could only have come into existence with financial support from Palmyra, and were created to meet the needs of the great metropolis through a specialization complementary to the agricultural oases of the rest of the steppe. Schlumberger hypothesized that some of the archaeological sites he studied were the stables or ranches essential to the famous Palmyrene cavalry. According to Stoneman, “Palmyra needed to control a sizeable hinterland simply to feed itself if it was not to import basic foodstuffs”.

== Language and culture ==
The population of Palmyrena originally spoke Palmyrene Aramaic, a dialect of Aramaic written in its own alphabet.

However, at some point the countryside began to be increasingly influenced by Arab culture, in terms of both religion and language, with archeological traces of the worship of Arabian deities and Safaitic inscriptions marking this cultural shift, whereas Palmyra was becoming more and more westernized as Greek and Roman influences increasingly pervaded the city.

Jean-Baptiste Yon adds to this discussion by suggesting that these Safaitic inscriptions found in the countryside may have originated during Palmyra’s height, not necessarily after its fall, suggesting that Arabization of the countryside may have been present even at the peak of Palmyra’s power. Regardless of when it occurred, this Arabization of the countryside ultimately left Palmyra standing, in the words of Schlumberger, as “an Aramean island in a world overwhelmed by the Arab ethnic tide, relatively unaffected by this vast movement of cultural penetration”.

== See also ==
- Damascena

== Sources ==
- Bruzen de La Martinière, M. (1736). Le grand dictionnaire géographique et critique (in French). Vol. 6, part 1.
- De Havilland, Mrs. Charles (1840). An Outline of the History of Ancient and Modern Rome (2nd ed.). London: Houlston & Stoneman.
- Gatier, Pierre-Louis (2001). "« Grande » ou « petite Syrie Seconde » ? Pour une géographie historique de la Syrie intérieure protobyzantine". Conquête de la steppe et appropriation des terres sur les marges arides du Croissant fertile (in French). Lyon: Maison de l'Orient et de la Méditerranée Jean Pouilloux.
- Gzella, Holger (2015). A Cultural History of Aramaic: From the Beginnings to the Advent of Islam.
- Lewis, Norman (2000). "The Syrian steppe during the last century of Ottoman rule: Hawran and the Palmyrena". The Transformation of Nomadic Society in the Arab East.
- Meyer, Jørgen Christian (2017). Palmyrena: Palmyra and the Surrounding Territory from the Roman to the Early Islamic period. Oxford: Archaeopress.
- Musil, Alois (1928). Palmyrena: A Topographical Itinerary. New York.
- Phelps Harris, Christina (2003). The Syrian Desert: Caravans, Travel and Exploration.
- Sartre-Fauriat, Annie (2019). "Jørgen Christian Meyer, Palmyrena. Palmyra and the Surrounding Territory from the Roman Period to the Early Islamic Period". Syria (in French). doi:10.4000/syria.8899.
- Schlumberger, Daniel (1939). "Bornes frontières de la Palmyrène". Syria (in French). 20 (1). doi:10.3406/syria.1939.4166.
- Schlumberger, Daniel (2010). Gelin, Mathilde (ed.). Daniel Schlumberger: L’Occident à la rencontre de l’Orient (in French).
- Stoneman, Richard (1992). Palmyra and Its Empire: Zenobia’s Revolt Against Rome.
- Will, Ernest (1953). "Daniel Schlumberger, La Palmyrène du Nord-Ouest. Villages et lieux de culte de l'époque impériale. Recherches archéologiques sur la mise en valeur d'une région du désert par les Palmyréniens. Suivi du recueil des inscriptions sémitiques de cette région par J. Ingholt et J. Starcky, avec une contribution de G. Ryckmans (Bibliothèque archéologique et historique de l'Institut français d'archéologie de Beyrouth, t. XLIX), 1951". Revue des études anciennes (in French). 55 (3–4): 478–479.
- Yon, Jean-Baptiste (2013). Les notables de Palmyre (in French).
