= Damascena =

Ancient region containing Damascus, Syria

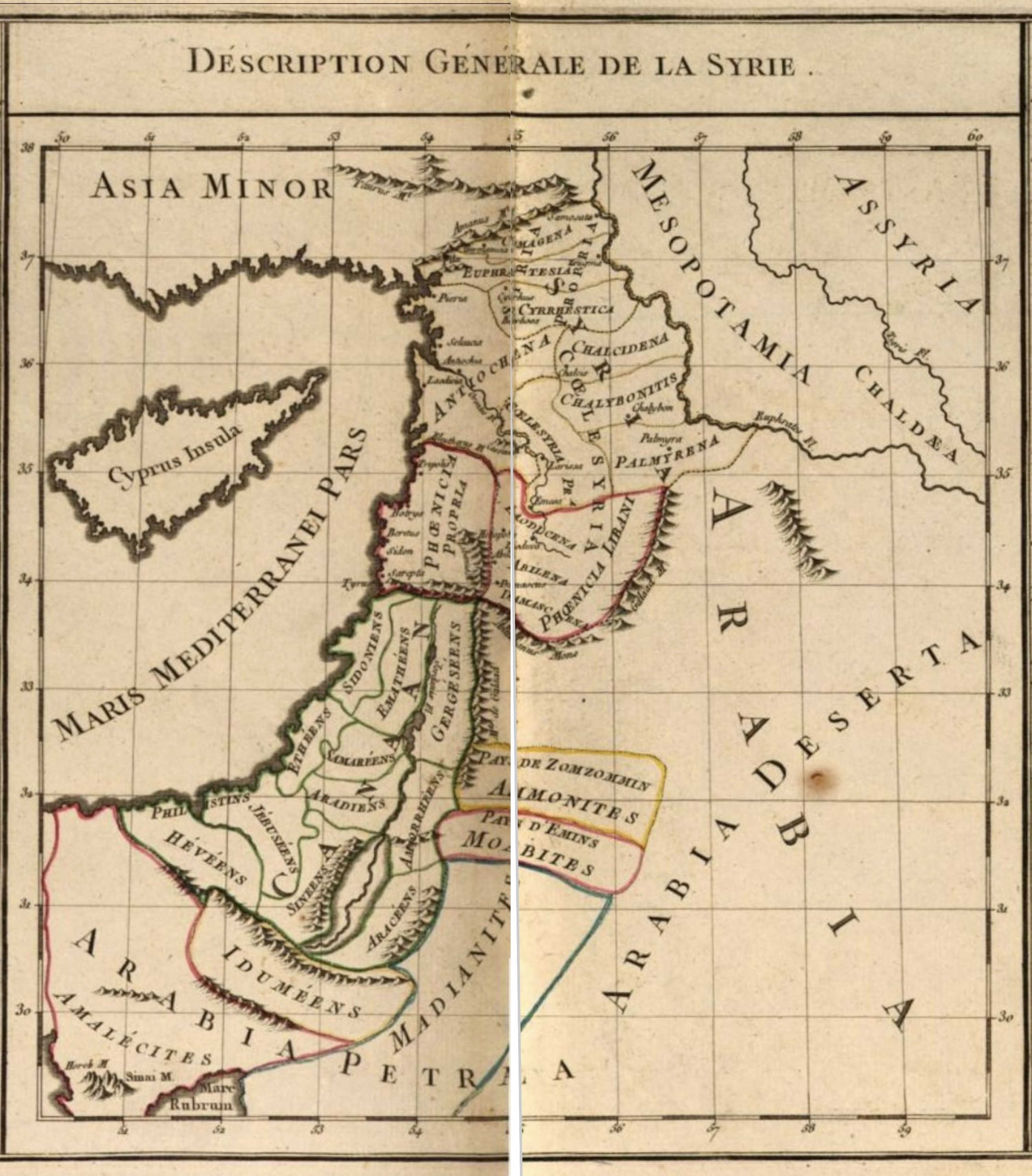
A 1772 map of the ancient Levant showing Damascena

Damascena or Damascene (from Ancient Greek Δαμασκηνή Damaskēnḗ, short for ἡ Δαμασκηνή χώρα hē Damaskēnḗ khṓra, lit. 'the Damascene region'; Latin: Damascena, short for Syria Damascena, lit. 'Damascene Syria' or regio Damascena, lit. 'the Damascene region') was the ancient term for the territory surrounding the city of Damascus in Hellenistic, Roman and Byzantine Syria. Although never a formal province, Damascena was frequently mentioned in Greek and Latin sources. The territory corresponds roughly to the modern Rif Dimashq Governorate of Syria (excluding the city proper, which forms its own administrative unit).

== History ==
Before the Hellenistic period, the region was part of the kingdom of Aram-Damascus (10th–8th centuries BCE), an independent Aramean state centered on Damascus. This kingdom represents the earliest known political entity corresponding to the territory later called Damascena.

The kingdom of Aram-Damascus was conquered by the Assyrian king Tiglath-Pileser III in 732 BCE, bringing the region under the control of the Neo-Assyrian Empire. Much of the population of Aram-Damascus was deported, marking the end of the independent Aramean kingdom.

After the fall of the Assyrian Empire in the late 7th century BCE, the area passed successively under the control of the Neo-Babylonian Empire and then the Achaemenid Empire (from c. 539 BCE). Under Achaemenid rule, Damascus formed part of the vast province of Eber-Nari (“Across-the-River”), administered alongside Phoenicia and Coele Syria.

Under the Seleucid Empire, Damascus served as an important administrative and commercial hub. After Pompey’s annexation of Syria in 64 BCE, the city and its surrounding territory came under Roman rule, incorporated into the province of Syria. The surrounding countryside was not an official province but a territory centered on the city, comparable to Emesena (around Emesa) or Palmyrena (around Palmyra). In 194 CE, Damascus became part of Syria Phoenice as a result of the division of Syria by Septimius Severus.

In late antiquity, Damascus became the seat of a bishopric and a prominent urban center. After the Arab conquest in the 7th century CE, Damascus became the capital of the Umayyad Caliphate (661–750), and the name Damascena for the surrounding territory fell out of use, as the jund Dimashq was created.

== Geography ==
Damascena occupied the southern part of inland Syria, extending from the oasis of Damascus (the Ghūṭa) into the Anti-Lebanon mountains to the west and the Syrian Desert to the east. To its north lay Emesena (the territory of Emesa, modern Homs), to the east Palmyrena (around Palmyra), and to the south the Decapolis cities and the Hauran region. The Ghūṭa, watered by the Barada River, sustained intensive agriculture. Damascus was a key urban center between the Eastern Mediterranean and Mesopotamia.

== Culture ==
At the end of antiquity, the inhabitants of Damascena were ethnically and linguistically diverse, including the Aramaic-speaking natives, Greek-speaking settlers, and later Arab populations.

== See also ==
- Aram-Damascus
- Palmyrena

== Sources ==
- Beeton, Samuel Orchart (1871). Beeton's Classical Dictionary.
- Gaffiot, Félix (1934). Dictionnaire latin-français. Paris: Hachette.
- Gatier, Pierre-Louis (2001). "« Grande » ou « petite Syrie Seconde » ? Pour une géographie historique de la Syrie intérieure protobyzantine". Conquête de la steppe et appropriation des terres sur les marges arides du Croissant fertile. Lyon: Maison de l'Orient et de la Méditerranée Jean Pouilloux.
- McClintock, John; Strong, James (1891). Cyclopædia of Biblical, Theological and Ecclesiastical Literature. Vol. 2. New York: Harper & Brothers.
- Raleigh, Walter (1614). The Historie of the World.
