= Palmyrene Aramaic =

Western Aramaic dialect spoken in the city of Palmyra in the early centuries AD

- Palmyrean
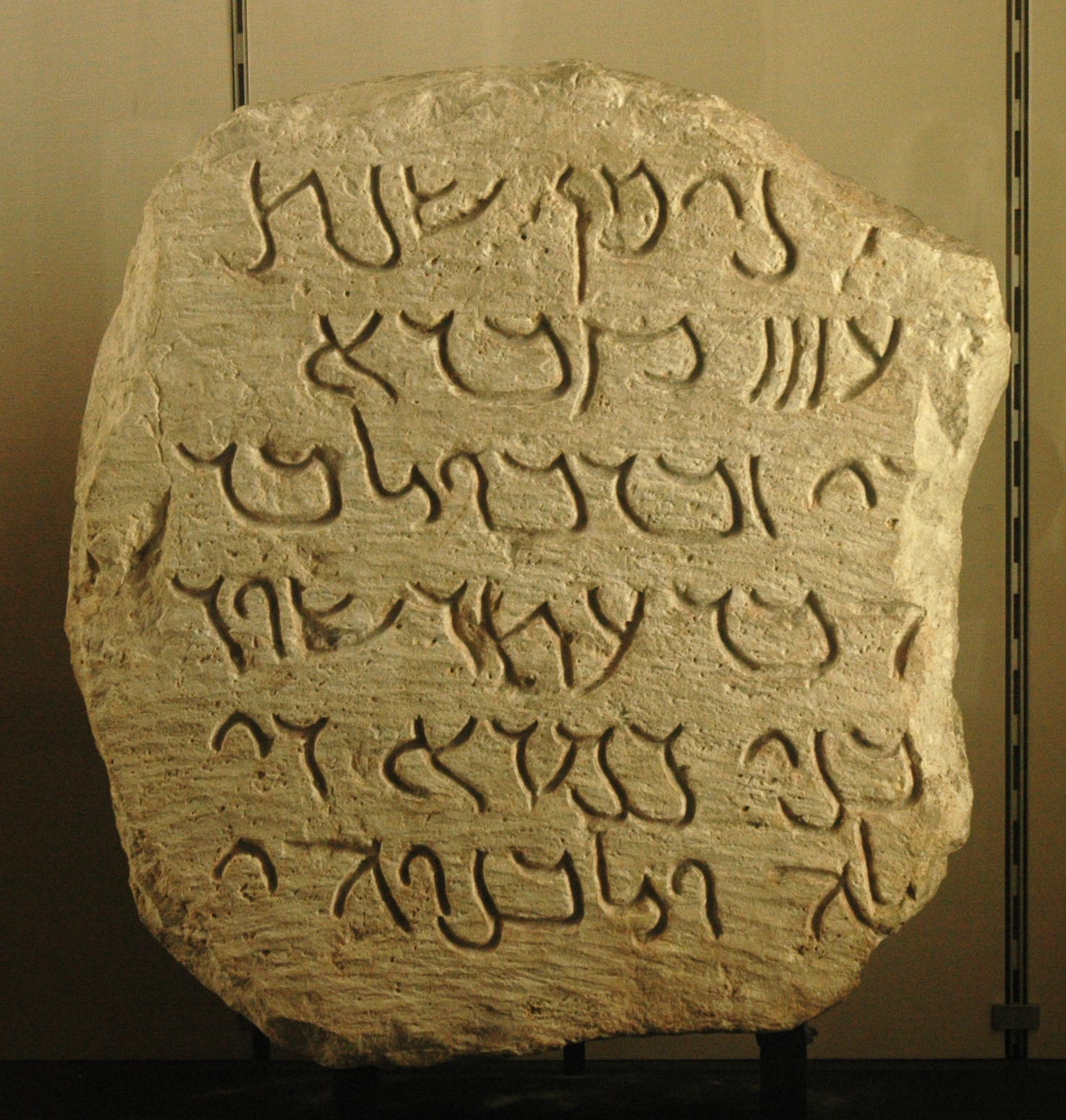
- Palmyrene inscription on a limestone funerary slab
- Region: Syrian Desert
- Extinct: 1st millennium
- Language family: Afro-Asiatic: Semitic; West Semitic; Central Semitic; Northwest Semitic; Aramaic; Palmyrene Aramaic
- Early forms: Proto-Afroasiatic: Proto-Semitic; Old Aramaic; Middle Aramaic
- Writing system: Palmyrene alphabet

Language codes
- ISO 639-3: –
- Glottolog: palm1242

Palmyrene Aramaic was a Middle Aramaic dialect, exhibiting both Eastern and Western Aramaic grammatical features, and is therefore often regarded as a dialect continuum between the two branches. (Note: The Palmyrene dialect has a dual affiliation because it combines features of both Western and Eastern Aramaic, but it is somewhat closer to the Eastern branch.) It is primarily documented in over 3,000 Palmyrene inscriptions dated between 44 BCE to 274 CE, mostly from Palmyra itself, but also found in the western parts of the Roman Empire, extending as far as Britannia.

The dialect still retains echoes of earlier Imperial Aramaic. The lexicon bears influences from both Koine Greek and, to some extent, Arabic.

The dual had disappeared from it.

The written Palmyrene language was composed in a rounded Palmyrene alphabet script that later exhibited resemblances to the Syriac Estrangela script.

== See also ==
- Middle Aramaic dialects
- Palmyrena
- Palmyrene Empire
