= Al-Lat =

Pre-Islamic Arabian goddess

al-Lat
- Goddess of war, peace, combat, and prosperity
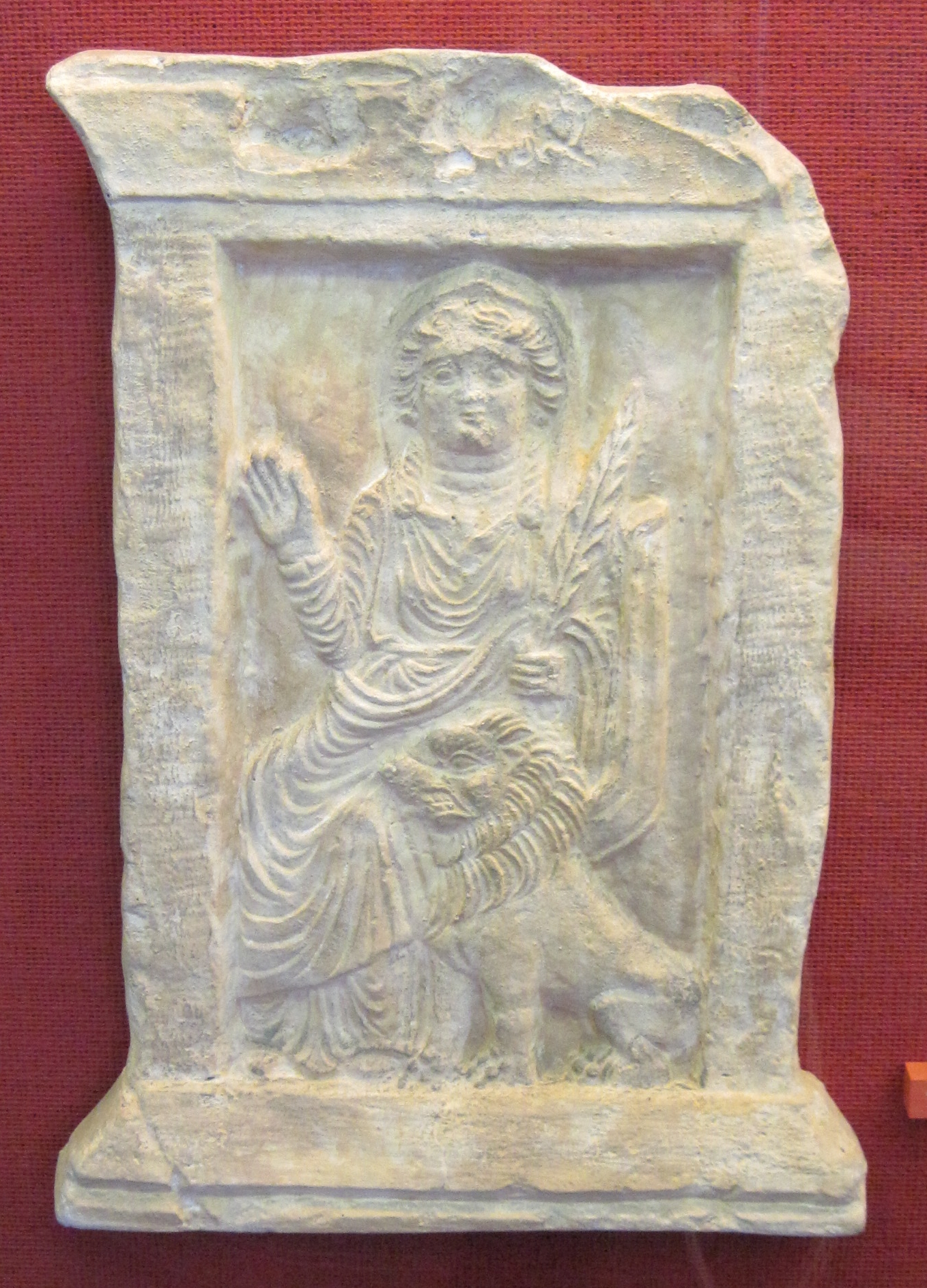
- Al-Lāt with a palm branch and her lion from the Temple of Baalshamin in Palmyra, first century AD, Damascus, Syria
- Major cult center: Palmyra, Iram, Ta'if (according to Islamic sources)
- Symbol: Lion, gazelle, crescent, cubic rock
- Region: Arabia

Genealogy
- Parents: Ruḍaw (Nomadic tradition) (father)
- Siblings: Al-Uzza, Manat
- Consort: Lion of Al-lat (Palmyrene tradition); Dushara (Nabataean tradition)
- Children: Dushara (Nabataean tradition)

Equivalents
- Greek: Aphrodite Urania, Athena
- Roman: Minerva
- Canaanite: Astarte, Atargatis
- Carthaginian: Allatu

Al-Lat (Arabic: اللات, romanized: al-Lāt, pronounced [alːaːt]), also spelled Allat, Allatu, and Alilat, is a pre-Islamic Arabian goddess, at one time worshipped under various associations throughout the Levant and the entire Arabian Peninsula, including Mecca, where she was worshipped alongside Al-Uzza and Manat. She was depicted as the feminine counterpart, consort, or daughter of Allah. The word Allat or Elat has been used to refer to various goddesses in the ancient Near East, including the goddess Asherah-Athirat. She also is associated with the Great Goddess.

The worship of al-Lat is attested in South Arabian inscriptions as Lat and Latan, but she had more prominence in north Arabia and the Hejaz, and her cult reached as far as Syria. The writers of the Safaitic script frequently invoked al-Lat in their inscriptions. She was also worshipped by the Nabataeans and was associated with al-'Uzza. The presence of her cult was attested in both Palmyra and Hatra. Under Greco-Roman influence, her iconography began to show the attributes of Athena, the Greek goddess of war, as well as Athena's Roman equivalent Minerva. According to Islamic sources, the tribe of Banu Thaqif in Ta'if especially held reverence to her.

In Islamic tradition, her worship ended in the seventh century when her temple in Ta'if was demolished on the orders of Muhammad.

== Etymology ==
The etymology of "al-Lat" is ultimately uncertain, with two sometimes competing theories, one based on Arabic traditions, the other on similarities with other Semitic religions. In the first, "al-Lat" is derived from a word meaning "to knead"; in the second, her name is akin to the feminine form of "Allah". Due to the association between the two names, debate over these derivations have been influenced by the belief among some Muslims that the word "Allah", referred to as Lafẓ al-Jalālah (The Word of Majesty), is a proper name, one that God chose for Himself, and not a title or derived from a title. Consequently, by making the word "Allat" a feminine form of "Allah" and a name itself derived from a title, is in conflict with such a non-derivation belief about the word "Allah".

Medieval Arab lexicographers derived the name from the verb latta (to mix or knead barley-meal). It has also been associated with the "idol of jealousy" erected in the temple of Jerusalem according to the Book of Ezekiel, which was offered an oblation of barley-meal by the husband who suspected his wife of infidelity. It can be inferred from al-Kalbi's Book of Idols that a similar ritual was practiced in the vicinity of the image of al-Lat.. This suggests potentially a proto-Semitic or later developed Pan-Semitic longstanding association with barley-meal.

In a euhemeristic retelling attributed to Ibn Abbas, Mujahid, and Ar-Rabi bin Anas: Al-Lat was a man who used to mix Sawiq (a kind of barley mash) with water for the pilgrims during the time of Jahiliyyah. When he died, the people remained next to his grave and worshiped him.

The second etymology takes al-Lat to be a feminine form akin to the name Allah. This is potentially supported by a form given by Herodotus, who identifies Ancient Greek: Ἀλιλᾱ́τ, romanized: Alilā́t (which would correspond to Arabic: *اَلْإِلَات, romanized: *alˀilāt) with Aphrodite Urania (one of only two deities Herodotus claims the Arabians worshiped). The ending "-āt" is explained as the same as an ossified vocative form like أَخَات (ˀaḫāt, 'O sister') for أُخْت (ˀuḫt, 'sister').. A similar theory is held for the ending of "ˀil+āh" to "ˀil" which is elsewhere only sporadically attested in Arabic but has left its trace in the -ā vocatives of أَب (ˁab, 'father'), أَخ (ˀaḫ, 'brother'), حَم (ḥam, 'father-in-law'). It should be noted, many gods and goddesses were referred to by the titles "al-ˀilāh" and "al-ˀilāt", and so it is not certain that the goddess referenced by Herodotus is one and the same.

More recent to both these theories, epigraphic evidence has revealed Old North Arabian languages (such as Safaitic and Hismaic), with forms lacking any definite article, leaving the form lt attested. al-Jallad (often considered the expert on these specific languages) groups the names ˀlh, lh, ˀlt, and lt together as variations, as Safaitic proper nouns lack definite articles (while Hismaic has suffixed definite articles instead of prefixed). MacDonald his mentor and leader of the OCIANA (Online Corpus of the Inscriptions of North Arabia) on the other hand considers this mistaken. He views that references to ˀlt and lt are different with ˀlt being a generic term for goddess and lt being a proper name. This does not however tell us much about the history of the word prior to becoming a proper name, only however potentially explains the wider conflation with the word and the Arabic root ل ت ت (L-T-T to bruise or bray, esp. barely wheat; grind, crumble, or making of flour and by ext. bread).

The goddess Asherah or Athirat was sometimes titled ˀlt "Elat" a word akin to the feminine equivalent/consort of the deity El. The Chaldean "Allat" is seen as a title for the Mesopotamian goddess Ereshkigal, the goddess of death (although the title is more likely to be derived from Hurrian: 𒀭𒊩𒌆𒆠𒃲, romanized: Allani instead of Semitic, but perhaps influenced by phono-semantic matching). A western Semitic goddess modeled on the Mesopotamian goddess was known accordingly as Allatum, and she was recognized in Carthage as Allatu.. Despite having been examined by some scholars, the connections however to the Arabian goddess 'Al-Lat' has not yet been established and the issue remains unsettled.

The goddess Allat's name is recorded as:

- 𐡄𐡍𐡀𐡋𐡕 (han-ʾIlat) in Imperial Aramaic;
- 𐢀𐢑𐢞 (Allāt) in Nabataean Arabic;
- 𐡠𐡫𐡶 (Allāt) in Palmyrene Aramaic;
- ʾlt (ʾIlāt), h-lt (ha-Lāt), and lt (Lāt) in Safaitic;
- 𐪁𐪉 (Lāt) in Dadanitic;
- 𐪁𐪉 (Lāt) in Thamudic;
- Ἀλιλάτ (Alilát) in Ancient Greek;
- 𐩡𐩩 (Lāt) and 𐩡𐩩𐩬 (Lātān) in Sabaean;
- أللاَّت ʾal-Lāt in Classical Arabic.

== Attestations ==
=== Pre-Islamic era ===
Al-Lat was mentioned as Alilat by the Greek historian Herodotus in his fifth-century BC work Histories, and she was considered the equivalent of Aphrodite (Aphrodite Urania):

The Assyrians call Aphrodite Mylitta, the Arabians Alilat [Greek spelling: Ἀλιλάτ], and the Persians Mithra.

According to Herodotus, the ancient Arabians believed in only two deities:

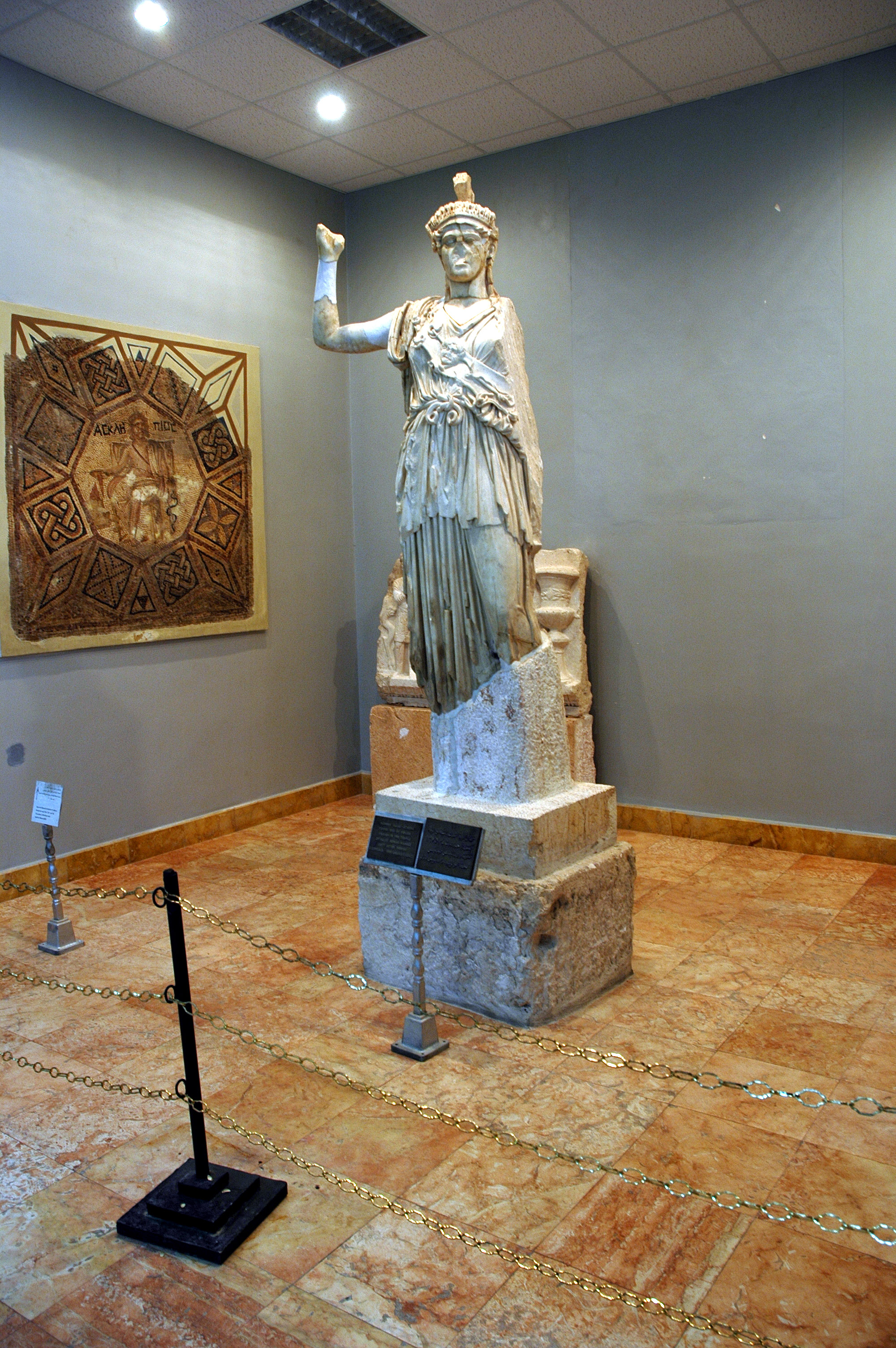
Statue of al-Lat-Athena found in the temple of Al-Lat, Palmyra. Palmyra Archaeological Museum

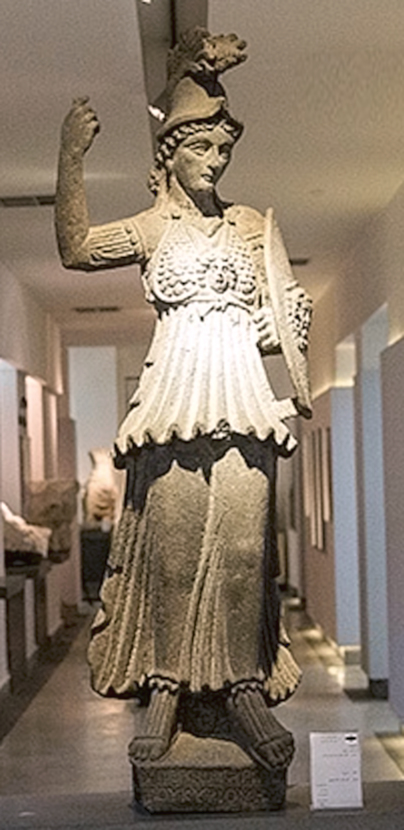
2nd-century AD statue of al-Lat-Minerva from As-Suwayda, Syria. National Museum of Damascus

They believe in no other gods except Dionysus and the Heavenly Aphrodite; and they say that they wear their hair as Dionysus does his, cutting it round the head and shaving the temples. They call Dionysus, Orotalt; and Aphrodite, Alilat.

Al-Lat was widely worshipped in north Arabia, but in South Arabia she was not popular and was not the object of an organized cult, with two amulets (inscribed "Lat" on one, "Latan" on the other) being the only indication that this goddess received worship in the area. However, she seems to have been popular among the Arab tribes bordering Yemen. She was also attested in eastern Arabia; the name Taymallat (a theophoric name invoking the goddess) was attested as the name of a man from Gerrha, a city located in the region.

From Safaitic and Hismaic inscriptions, it is probable that she was worshipped as Lat (lt). In Safaitic inscriptions, al-Lat was invoked for solitude and mercy, as well as to provide well-being, ease and prosperity. Travelers would invoke her for good weather and protection. She was also invoked for vengeance, booty from raids, and infliction of blindness, and lameness to anyone who defaces their inscriptions.

The Qedarites, a northern Arabian tribal confederation, seemed to have also worshipped al-Lat, as evidenced by a silver bowl dedicated by a Qedarite king, with the goddess' name inscribed on it.

The Nabataeans and the people of Hatra also worshipped al-Lat, equating her with the Greek goddesses Athena and Tyche and the Roman goddess Minerva. She is frequently called "the Great Goddess" in Greek in multilingual inscriptions. The Nabataeans regarded al-Lat as the mother of the deities, and her family relations vary; sometimes she is regarded as the consort of Dushara and at other times as the mother of Dushara. Nabataean inscriptions call her and al-'Uzza the "brides of Dushara".

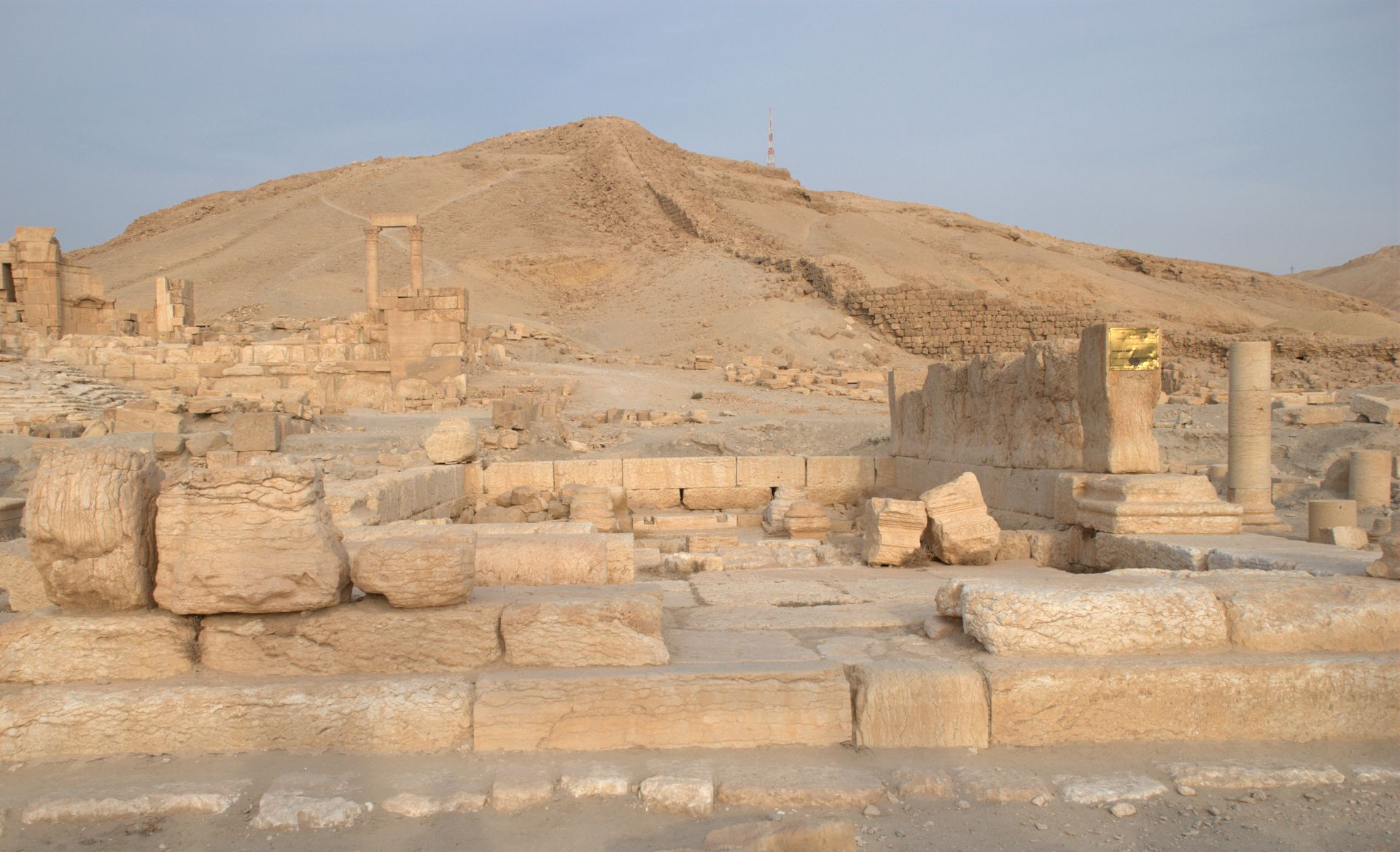
Remains of the temple of al-Lat, Palmyra, Syria

A temple was built for al-Lat in Iram of the Pillars, by the tribe of ʿĀd. Al-Lat was referred to as "the goddess who is in Iram" in a Nabataean inscription. She was also referred to as "the goddess who is in Bosra". Perhaps a local Hijazi form of her attested in Hegra alongside Dushara and Manat was "Allat of 'Amnad".

Al-Lat was closely related to al-'Uzza, and in some regions of the Nabataean kingdom, both al-Lat and al-'Uzza were said to be the same goddess. John F. Healey believes that al-Lat and al-'Uzza originated as a single goddess, which parted ways in the pre-Islamic Meccan tradition. Susan Krone suggests that both al-Lat and al-'Uzza were uniquely fused in central Arabia.

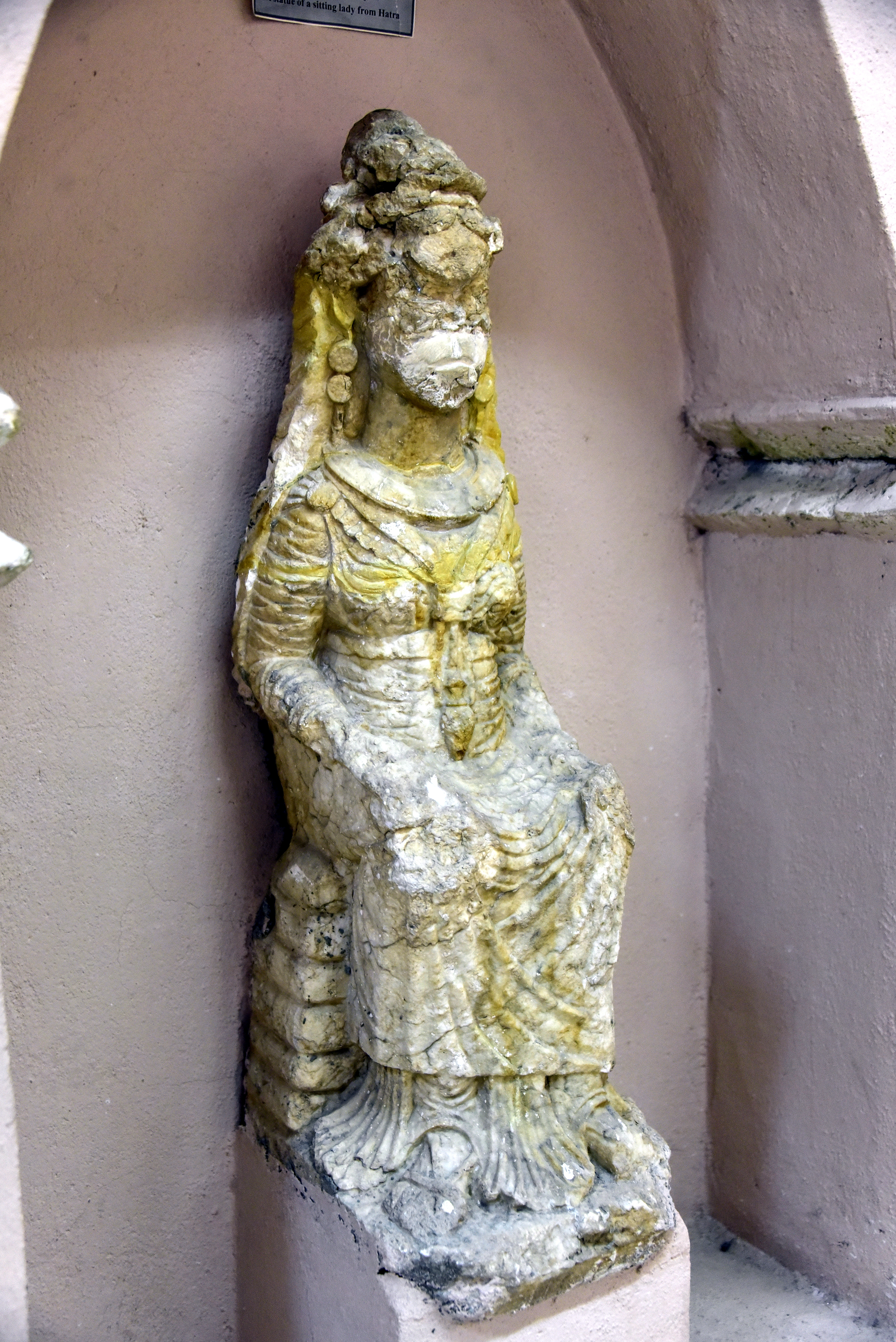
Statue of an enthroned Arabian goddess or idol, probably Al-Lat, from Hatra, Iraq. second to third century CE. Sulaymaniyah Museum, Iraq

Al-Lat was also venerated in Palmyra, where she was known as the "Lady of the temple". According to an inscription, she was brought into the Arab quarter of the city by a member of the Bene Ma'zin tribe, who were probably an Arab tribe. (Note: Ma'zin is an Arabic word meaning "goat herders". While Teixidor described the tribe as Arab, Michał Gawlikowski, head of the Polish archaeological expedition in Palmyra between 1980 and 2011, stated that the tribe is best understood as an alliance of pastoralists from different origins who settled in the city.) She had a temple in the city, which Teixidor believed to be the cultic center of Palmyrene Arab tribes. The practice of casting divination arrows, a common divination method in Arabia, was attested in her temple; an honorific inscription mentioning "a basin of silver for [casting] lots (lḥlq)".

By the second-century AD, al-Lat in Palmyra began to be portrayed in the style of Athena, and was referred to as "Athena-Allāt", but this assimilation does not extend beyond her iconography. The Palmyrene emperor Vaballathus, whose name is the Latinized form of the theophoric name Wahballāt ("Gift of al-Lat"), began to use Athenodorus as the Greek form of his name.

=== Islamic tradition ===
In Islamic sources discussing pre-Islamic Arabia, al-Lat is attested as the chief goddess of the Banu Thaqif tribe. She was said to be venerated in Ta'if, where she was called ar-Rabba ("The Lady"), and she reportedly had a shrine there that was decorated with ornaments and treasure of gold and onyx. There, the goddess was venerated in the form of a cubic granite rock. The area around the shrine was considered sacred; no trees could be felled, no animal could be hunted, and no human blood could be shed.

According to al-Kalbi's Book of Idols, her shrine was under the guardianship of the Banū Attāb ibn Mālik of the Banu Thaqif. She was also venerated by other Arab tribes, including the Quraysh, and their children would be named after the goddess, such as Zayd al-Lat and Taym al-Lat.

Al-Lat is also mentioned in pre-Islamic Arab poetry, such as in al-Mutalammis' satire of Amr ibn Hind:

Thou hast banished me for fear of lampoon and satire.
No! By Allat and all the sacred baetyls (ansab)
thou shalt not escape.

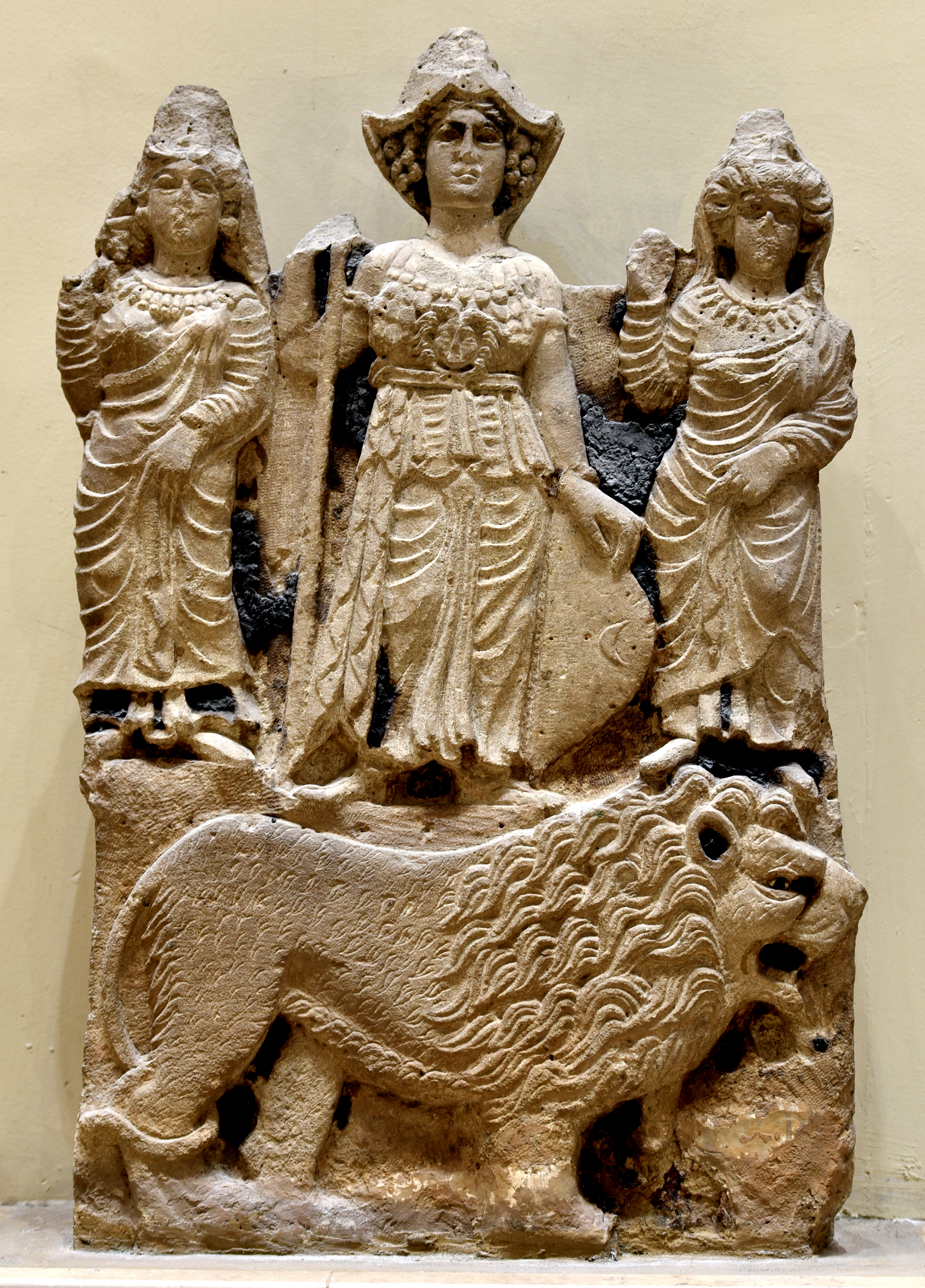
Relief of the Arabian goddesses Al-Lat, Manat, and al-Uzza from Hatra, second century AD. Iraq Museum

A poem by the pre-Islamic monotheist Zayd ibn Amr mentions al-Lat, along with al-'Uzza and Hubal:

Am I to worship one lord or a thousand?
If there are as many as you claim,
I renounce al-Lat and al-Uzza, both of them,
as any strong-minded person would.
I will not worship al-Uzza and her two daughters…
I will not worship Hubal, though he was our lord
in the days when I had little sense.

Al-Lat was also called as a daughter of Allah along with the other two chief goddesses al-'Uzza and Manat. According to the Book of Idols, the Quraysh were to chant the following verses as they circumambulated the Kaaba:

By al-Lat and al-'Uzza,
And Manat, the third idol besides.
Verily they are the gharaniq
Whose intercession is to be sought.

The word gharaniq was translated as "most exalted females" by Faris in his English translation of the Book of Idols, but he annotates this term in a footnote as "lit. Numidean cranes".

According to Islamic tradition, the shrine dedicated to al-Lat in Ta'if was demolished on the orders of Muhammad, during the Expedition of Abu Sufyan ibn Harb, in the same year as the Battle of Tabuk (which occurred in October 630 AD). The destruction of the cult image was a demand by Muhammad before he would allow any reconciliation to take place with the tribes of Ta'if, who were under his siege. According to the Book of Idols, this occurred after the Banu Thaqif converted to Islam, and that her temple was "burnt to the ground".

In the al-Tabari's history the name of the Goodess is used by Abu Bakr. When Urwah ibn Masʽud indirectly insulted him by saying that Mohammeds Companions might desert him in the face of danger, he in turn to insulted him by saying "Go suck the clitoris of al-Lat! Would we flee and leave him?", with clitoris sometimes translated as nipples. It is based on the proverb to suck someones mothers clitoris, also found in other sources of the time.

==== Quran and Satanic Verses incident ====
In the Quran, she is mentioned along with al-‘Uzza and Manat in Quran 53:19–22, which became the subject of the alleged Satanic Verses incident, an occasion on which the Islamic prophet Muhammad had mistaken the words of "satanic suggestion" for divine revelation. Many different versions of the story existed (all traceable to one single narrator Muhammad ibn Ka'b, who was two generations removed from biographer Ibn Ishaq). In its essential form, the story reports that during Muhammad's recitation of Surat An-Najm, when he reached the following verses:

Have you thought of al-Lāt and al-‘Uzzá
and Manāt, the third, the other?

— Quran 53:19–20

Satan tempted him to utter the following line:

These are the exalted gharāniq, whose intercession is hoped for. (In Arabic تلك الغرانيق العلى وإن شفاعتهن لترتجى.)

Following this, the angel Gabriel chastised Muhammad for uttering that line, and the verses were abrogated with a new revelation:

Are yours the males and His the females? That were indeed an unfair division!

— Quran 53:21–22

The majority of Muslim scholars have rejected the historicity of the incident on the basis of the theological doctrine of 'isma (prophetic infallibility i.e., divine protection of Muhammad from mistakes) and their weak isnads (chains of transmission). Due to its defective chain of narration, the tradition of the Satanic Verses never made it into any of the canonical hadith compilations, though reference and exegesis about the Verses appear in early histories, such as al-Tabari's Tārīkh ar-Rusul wal-Mulūk and Ibn Ishaq's Sīrat Rasūl Allāh (as reconstructed by Alfred Guillaume).

==== The "Grinder" legend ====
Various legends about her origins were known in medieval Islamic tradition, including one that linked al-Lat's stone with a man who grinds cereal (al-latt, "the grinder"). The stone was used as a base for the man (a Jew) to grind cereal for the pilgrims of Mecca. While most versions of this legend place the man at Ta'if, other versions place him at either Mecca or 'Ukaz. After the man's death, the stone, or the man in the form of a stone, was deified, according to some legends after the Khuza'a drove the Jurhum out of Mecca, while other legends report it was Amr ibn Luhayy who deified the grinder.

Michael Cook noticed the oddity of this story, as it would make al-Lat masculine. Gerald Hawting believes the various legends that link al-Lat with that of al-latt, "the grinder", was an attempt to relate al-Lat with Mecca. He also compared the legends to Isaf and Na'ila, who according to legend were a man and a woman who fornicated inside the Kaaba and were petrified. These two stones representing the primordial couple (sic Adam & Eve the so called ancestors of the human race) most likely pre-existed this cautionary tale promulgated by Islam. Furthermore, Isaf and Na'ila played a central role in the Quraish and al-Khuza'a's ritual practice of hierogamy or 'sacred marriage' culminating in a communal wedding feast 'walima'. This joyful event took place every year during the mid-winter month of Dhu'l Hijjah on and around Mt. Arafat until the pair of baetyls were finally removed and placed at Jabal as-Safa'a and Jabal al-Marwah in Mecca.

== Mythological role ==
F. V. Winnet saw al-Lat as a lunar deity due to association of a crescent with her in 'Ayn esh-Shallāleh and a Lihyanite inscription mentioning the name of Wadd over the title of 'fkl lt. René Dussaud and Gonzague Ryckmans linked her with Venus, while others have thought her to be a solar deity. John F. Healey considers al-Uzza might have been an epithet of al-Lat before becoming a separate deity in the Meccan pantheon. Redefining Dionysos considers she might have been a deity of vegetation or a celestial deity of atmospheric phenomena and a sky deity. According to Wellhausen, the Nabataeans believed al-Lat was the mother of Hubal (and hence the mother-in-law of Manāt).

It has been hypothesized that Allah was the consort of al-Lat, given that it is typical of deities in that area of the world to have consorts.

== Iconography ==
In Ta'if, al-Lat's primary cult image was a cubic stone, sometimes described as white in color. Waqidi's mention of the 'head' (ra's) of ar-Rabba may imply that the image was perceived in human or animal form, although Julius Wellhausen resisted this implication.

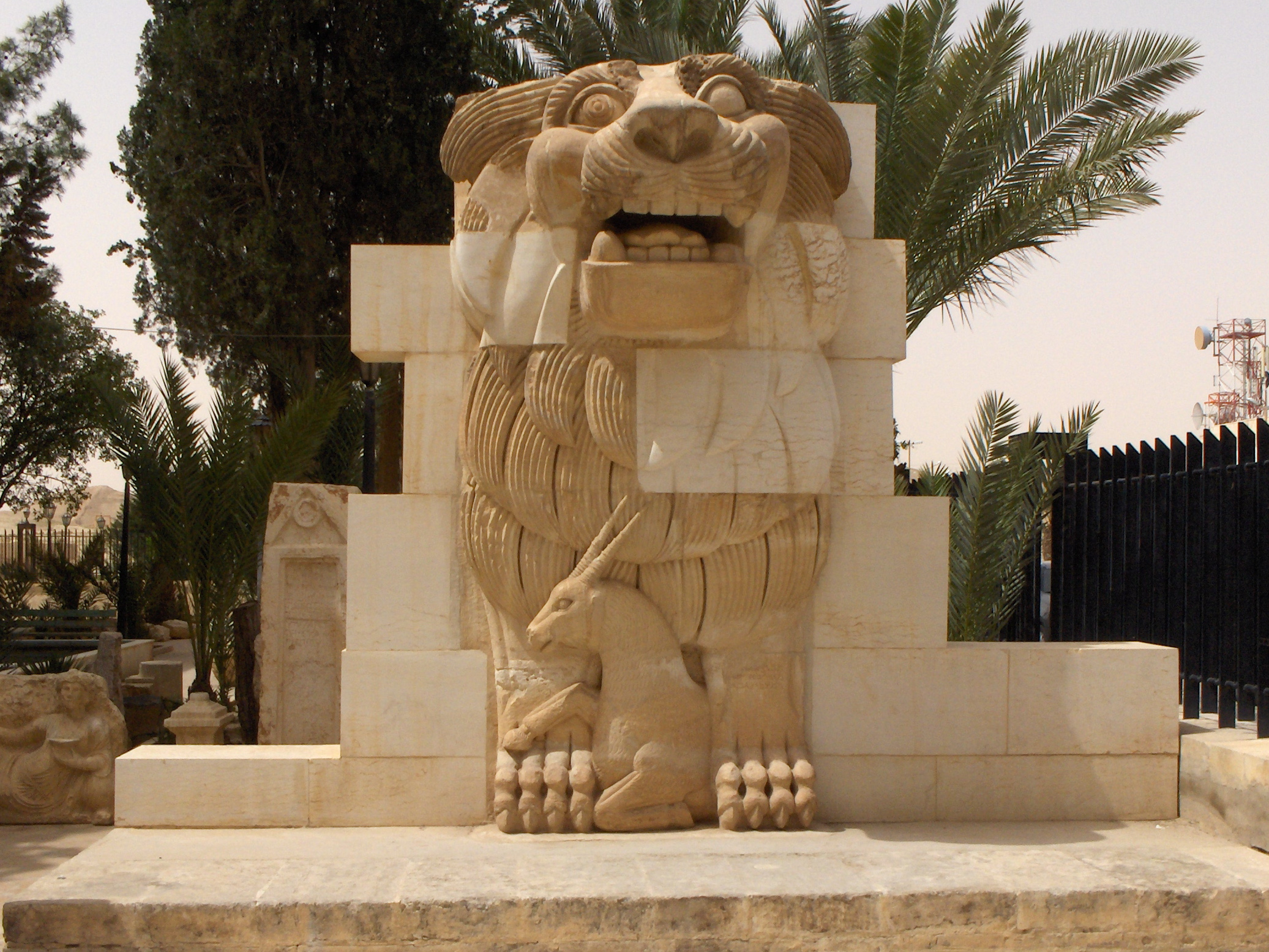
The Lion of Al-Lat, representing the goddess and her consort.

Early Palmyrene depictions of al-Lat share iconographical traits with Atargatis (when seated) and Astarte (when standing). The Lion of Al-Lat that once adorned her temple depicts a lion and a gazelle, the lion representing her consort, and the gazelle representing al-Lat's tender and loving traits, as bloodshed was not permitted under penalty of al-Lat's retaliation.

Al-Lat was associated with the Greek goddess Athena (and by extension, the Roman Minerva) in Nabataea, Hatra, and Palmyra. It seems that her identification with Athena was only a mere change in iconography, and al-Lat's character noticeably softened the warlike Athena in places where she was equated with al-Lat. One Nabataean relief of Athena-al-Lat depicts the goddess bearing both Athena and al-Lat's attributes. The relief depicts the goddess in the style of Athena, but having a Nabataean religion stylized eye-betyl in place of the Gorgoneion.

Al-Lat can also be identified with the Babylonian goddess Ishtar, with both of the deities taking part in prosperity, warfare, and later being linked to Aphrodite and Athena. The two's similarities also appeared in their symbols, as both were associated with lions, morning star, and crescents. Like Al-Lat, Ishtar's origin was of Semitic roots.

== Modern relevance ==
The Lion of Al-Lat statue that adorned her temple in Palmyra was damaged by the Islamic State of Iraq and the Levant (ISIL) in 2015 but has been since restored. It now stands in the National Museum of Damascus, but it may be returned to Palmyra in the future.

In the science-fiction Dune novels by Frank Herbert, "al-Lat" is the spiritual name used by the post-Islamic Fremen to describe the sun or primary star of an inhabited planet, most notably that of their homeworld, Arrakis.

== See also ==
- Asherah
- Banu Thaqif
- Hubal
- List of pre-Islamic Arabian deities
- Manāt
- Satanic Verses
