= Laïla Nehmé =

Lebanese-French archaeologist

Laïla Nehmé (born 1966) is a Lebanese-French archaeologist. A specialist in the archaeology and epigraphy of the ancient Near East, she is known for her research on Nabataean writings, the evolution of the Nabataean script into the Arabic, and archaeological excavations at Petra and Mada'in Saleh.

== Early life ==
Laïla Nehmé was born in Beirut, Lebanon, where she attended high school. A meeting with a restorer of ceramics from a dig in northern Lebanon prompted her to seek higher studies in archaeology.

Nehmé attended the Pantheon-Sorbonne University, where Jean-Marie Dentzer guided her research between 1991 and 1994. She wrote her doctoral thesis on Petra in 1994. She began to conduct excavations in Syria and Jordan, and to specialise in the epigraphy of northern Arabic.

== Career ==
Nehmé has been directing excavations at Mada'in Saleh, an ancient Nabataean centre. Her team has discovered several tomb sites, a walled city, comprising mud-brick structures, as well as oases where the granaries and wells supported the local agriculture.

She has studied the transition of scripts from the Nabataean Aramaic to the Nabataean Arabic form that was in use between the third and fifth centuries AD. Nehmé has been credited with categorizing and coining the name of this transitional script.

== Awards ==
- 2010 – Chevalier of the National Order of Merit (France)
- 2007 – Prix Clio for Archaeological Research.

== Selected works ==
=== Articles ===
- Nehmé, L. (2016). "Nabataean Kingdom". In MacKenzie, J.M. (ed.). The Encyclopedia of Empire. pp. 1–3. doi:10.1002/9781118455074.wbeoe031. ISBN 9781118455074.
- Nehmé, L. (2015). "Strategoi in the Nabataean Kingdom : a reflection of Central Places?". Arabian Epigraphic Notes. 1.
- Nehmé, L. (2010). "Hegra of Arabia Felix". In al-Ghabban, A (ed.). Roads of Arabia: Archaeology and History of the Kingdom of Saudi Arabia. Somology Art Publishers.
- Nehmé, L. (2010b). Macdonald, M.C.A. (ed.). "A glimpse of the development of the Nabataean script into Arabic based on old and new epigraphic material". Proceedings of the Seminar for Arabian Studies. 40: 47–88. JSTOR 41224043.
- Nehmé, L. (2003). "Les inscriptions des chambres funéraires nabatéennes et la question de l'anonymat des tombes". Arabian Archaeology and Epigraphy. 14 (2): 203–258. doi:10.1034/j.1600-0471.2003.00017.x.
- Nehmé, L. (2001). "Langue et écriture nabatéennes". Clio.
- Nehmé, L. (1997). "L'espace cultuel de Pétra à l'époque nabatéenne". Topoi. 7 (2).
- Macdonald, M.; Al-Mu'azzin, M.; Nehmé, L. (1996). "Les inscriptions safaïtiques de Syrie, cent quarante ans après leur découverte". Comptes Rendus des Séances de l'Académie des Inscriptions et Belles-Lettres. 140 (1).

=== Books ===
- Nehmé, L.; Abu-Azizeh, W.; Bauzou, T.; et al. (2015). Report on the Fifth Season (2014) of the Madâ'in Sâlih Archaeological Project.
- Nehmé, L.; Villeneuve, F. (1999). Pétra: Métropole de l'Arabie antique. Seuil. ISBN 978-2702837689.
- Nehmé, L. (1994). L'espace urbain de Pétra (Jordanie) de l'époque nabatéenne à l'époque byzantine à travers les sources archéologiques et épigraphiques (Ph.D.). Pantheon-Sorbonne University.

== See also ==
- Ahmad Al-Jallad
- Michael C. A. Macdonald

== Additional sources ==
- Alhatlani, Abdullah Saad; Al-Manaser, Ali (2024). "From Nabataeo-Arabic to Palaeo-Arabic: Two new pre-Islamic graffiti from the Jordanian Ḥarrah". Palestinian Exploration Quarterly: 1–10. doi:10.1080/00310328.2024.2363676.
