= Nabataean (Unicode block) =

- Range: U+10880..U+108AF (48 code points)
- Plane: SMP
- Scripts: Nabataean
- Major alphabets: Nabataean alphabet
- Assigned: 40 code points
- Unused: 8 reserved code points

Unicode version history
- 7.0 (2014): 40 (+40)

Unicode documentation
- Code chart ∣ Web page

Nabataean is a Unicode block containing characters for writing the ancient Nabataean language.

Nabataean^{[1]}^{[2]} Official Unicode Consortium code chart (PDF)
	0	1	2	3	4	5	6	7	8	9	A	B	C	D	E	F
U+1088x	𐢀	𐢁	𐢂	𐢃	𐢄	𐢅	𐢆	𐢇	𐢈	𐢉	𐢊	𐢋	𐢌	𐢍	𐢎	𐢏
U+1089x	𐢐	𐢑	𐢒	𐢓	𐢔	𐢕	𐢖	𐢗	𐢘	𐢙	𐢚	𐢛	𐢜	𐢝	𐢞	
U+108Ax								𐢧	𐢨	𐢩	𐢪	𐢫	𐢬	𐢭	𐢮	𐢯
Notes: 1. As of Unicode version 16.0; 2. Grey areas indicate non-assigned code points

== History ==
The following Unicode-related documents record the purpose and process of defining specific characters in the Nabataean block:

Version	Final code points (Note: Proposed code points and characters names may differ from final code points and names)	Count	L2 ID	WG2 ID	Document
7.0	U+10880..1089E, 108A7..108AF	40	L2/10-294	N3875	Everson, Michael (2010-07-25), Preliminary proposal for encoding the Nabataean script in the SMP of the UCS
7.0	U+10880..1089E, 108A7..108AF	40	L2/10-473	N3969	Everson, Michael (2010-12-09), Proposal for encoding the Nabataean script in the SMP of the UCS
7.0	U+10880..1089E, 108A7..108AF	40	L2/11-016		Moore, Lisa (2011-02-15), "C.8", UTC #126 / L2 #223 Minutes
7.0	U+10880..1089E, 108A7..108AF	40		N4103	"11.2.10 Nabataean script", Unconfirmed minutes of WG 2 meeting 58, 2012-01-03
