= Expedition of Abu Sufyan ibn Harb =

Campaigns ordered by Muhammad

Date	October 630 CE
Location	Ta'if, Arabia
Result	Successful Muslim expedition

Belligerents
Muslims	Citizens of Ta'if

Commanders and leaders
Abu Sufyan	Malik ibn Awf

Strength
Unknown	Unknown

Casualties and losses
0	Unknown

Expedition of Abu Sufyan ibn Harb or the Demolition of al-Lat, occurred in the same year as the Battle of Tabuk (which occurred in October 630 AD ). Muhammad sent Abu Sufyan with a group armed men to destroy the Idol Allāt (also referred to as al-Tagiyyah) that was worshipped by the citizens of Taif. The destruction of the idol was a demand by Muhammad before any reconciliation could take place with the citizens of Taif.The event is also mentioned in the Quran verse 17:73.

== Quran 17:73 ==
According to the Muslim scholar Al-Suyuti, the Quran verse 17:73 was revealed about this event, after the tribe asked Muhammad to be excused from the daily prayers

== Islamic primary sources ==
=== Quran ===
The event is mentioned in the Quran (according to al-Suyuti):

And their purpose was to tempt thee away from that which We had revealed unto thee, to substitute in our name something quite different; (in that case), behold! they would certainly have made thee (their) friend! ^{[Quran 17:73]}

Al Suyuti's commentary on the verse is as follows:

The following was revealed regarding the [tribe of] Thaqīf, for they had asked him [the Prophet] (s) to declare their valley inviolable and implored him [to grant them this request]: And indeed (wa-in, [the particle in is] softened) they were about to, they nearly did, beguile you away from that which We revealed to you, so that you might invent against Us [something] other than that; and then, had you done that, they would have taken you as a friend. [Tafsir al Jalayn on 17:73]

=== Early Muslim sources ===
The event is mentioned by the Muslim jurist Tabari (he refers to al-Lat as Tagiyyah, which is an alternate name). He wrote:

When they left the messenger of God turned down their homeland, the Messenger of God dispatched Abu Sufyan b. Harb and al- Mughirah b. Shu'bah to demolish al-Taghiyyah. The two traveled with the deputation until they approached al-Ta'if, at which point al-Mughirah asked Abu Sufyan to precede him. Abu Sufyan refused, saying "Go to your kinsfolk yourself," and stayed at his estate in Dhu al-Harm. When al-Mughirah b. Shubah entered [al Taif] he mounted the idol and struck it with a pickaxe while his folk, the Banu Mu'attib stood by him, fearing that he might be shot at or struck as 'Urwah had been. The women of Thaqif came out with their heads uncovered and said, lamenting the [loss of the] idol [ie, the goddess]

"Oh, shed tears for the protector! Ignoble ones have forsaken her, those not competent in wielding swords"

He said: While al-Mughirah was striking the idol with the axe, Abu Sufyan was saying, "Alas for you, alas! " When al- Mughirah had demolished it, he took its treasure and ornamentation and sent [it] to Abu Sufyan. Its ornamentation was made up of various items, while its treasure consisted of gold and onyx.

The Messenger of God had previously instructed Abu Sufyan to pay the debts of 'Urwah and al-Aswad, the sons of Mas'ud, from the property of al-Lat, so he discharged their debts.

[Tabari, Volume 9, The last Years of the Prophet 45-46]

== See also ==
- Military career of Muhammad
- List of expeditions of Muhammad
