= Temple of Al-Lat =

- معبد اللات (Arabic)
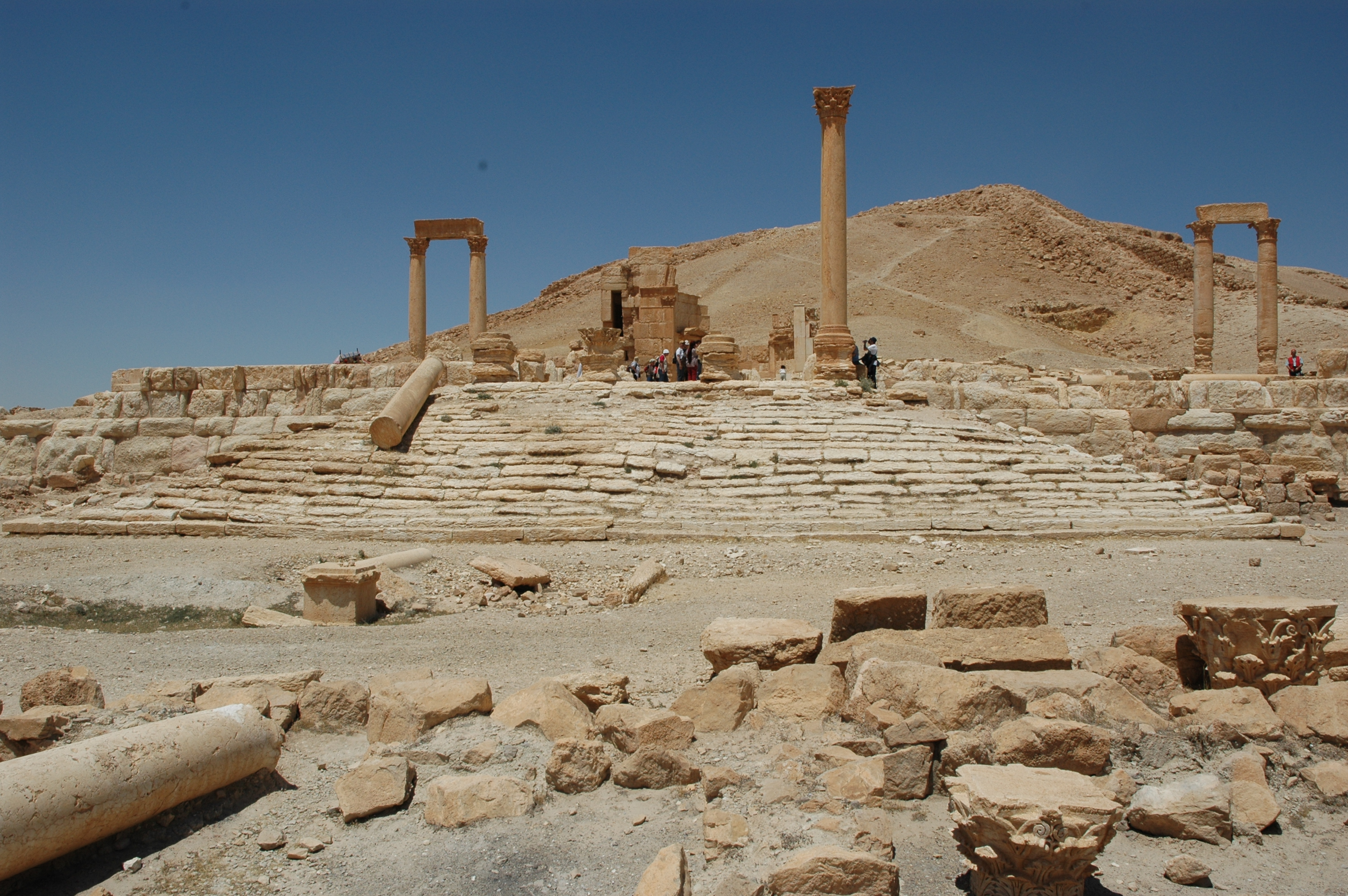
- The Temple of Al-Lat in 2004

- Location within Syria
- 34.553401°N 38.269941°E
- Type: Temple
- Cultures: Palmyrene
- Location: Palmyra, Syria

History
- Built: 123 AD

Site notes
- Material: Stone
- Owner: Public

UNESCO World Heritage Site
- Type: Cultural
- Criteria: i, ii, iv
- Designated: 1980 (4th session)
- Part of: Site of Palmyra
- Reference no.: 23
- Region: Arab States
- Endangered: 2013–present

The Temple of Al-Lat (Arabic: معبد اللات), was an ancient temple located in Palmyra, Syria dedicated to the goddess Al-Lat.

The temple was dedicated by the citizen Taimarsu of Palmyra in c. 123–164 A.D. The cult statue was made with an appearance similar to statues of the Greek goddess Athena in Athens. This would be in line with the fact that the Arabian goddess Al-Lat, in the interpretatio graeca customary at the time, was identified with the Hellenistic goddess Athena.

The temple was closed during the persecution of pagans in the late Roman Empire in a campaign made by Maternus Cynegius, Praetorian prefect of the East, between 25 May 385 to 19 March 388, when the altar of the temple was destroyed and the cult statue of Allat-Athena was decapitated and had the center of its face crushed. Votive gifts of Roman Bronze coins from c. 364–375 and 376–386 illustrate that the sanctuary was still in use at the time of its destruction. In contrast to other temples in Palmyra, the temple of Al-Lat was not converted to a church, but left to decay.

Only a podium, a few columns, and the door frame remain. Inside the compound, a giant lion relief –(Lion of Al-lāt) was excavated and, in its original form, was a relief protruding from the temple compound's wall.

== Gallery ==
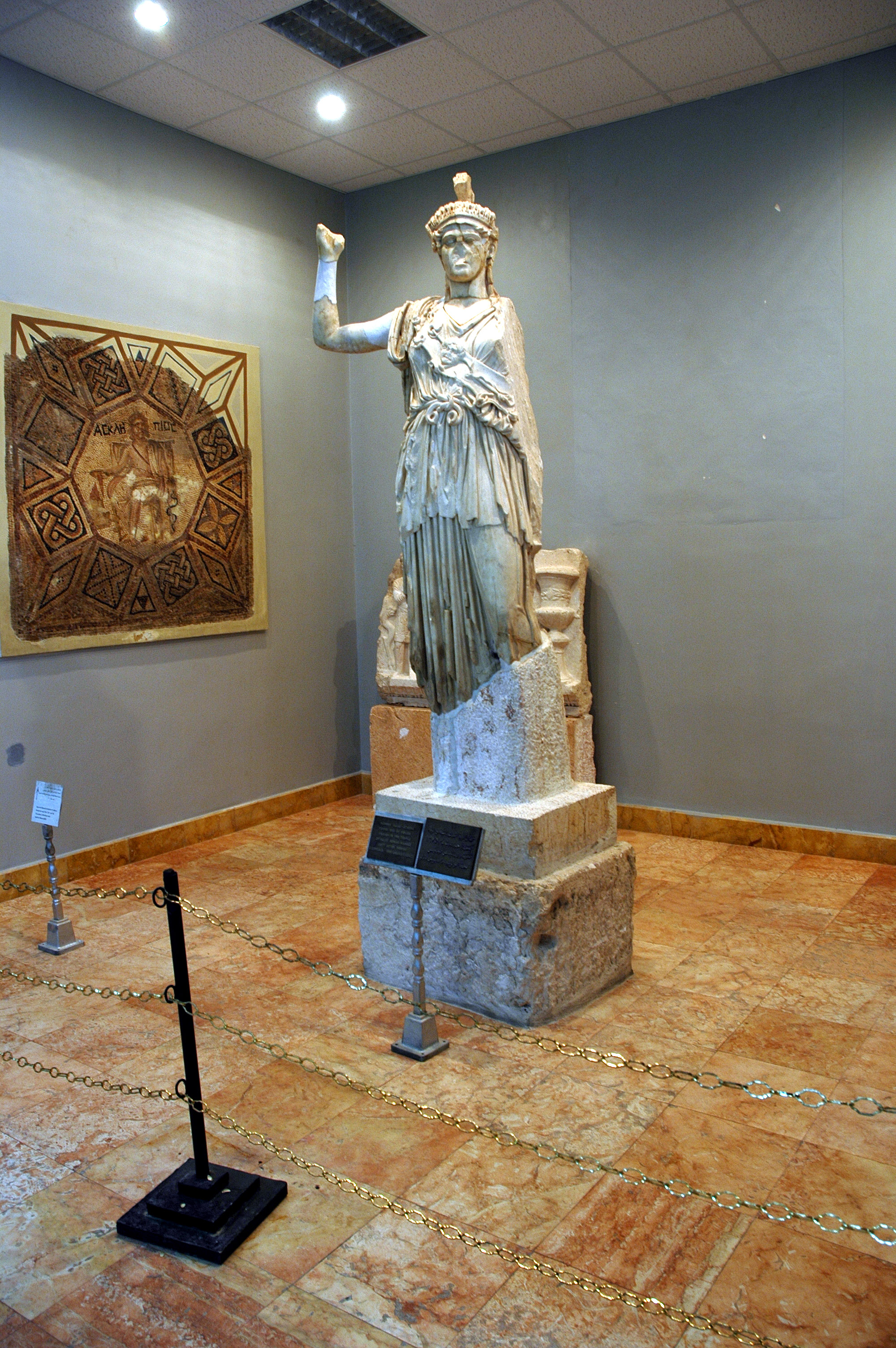
Statue of the goddess of Allat Athena from the temple.
