= JSNab 17 =

Third-century funerary inscription in the Nabataean script

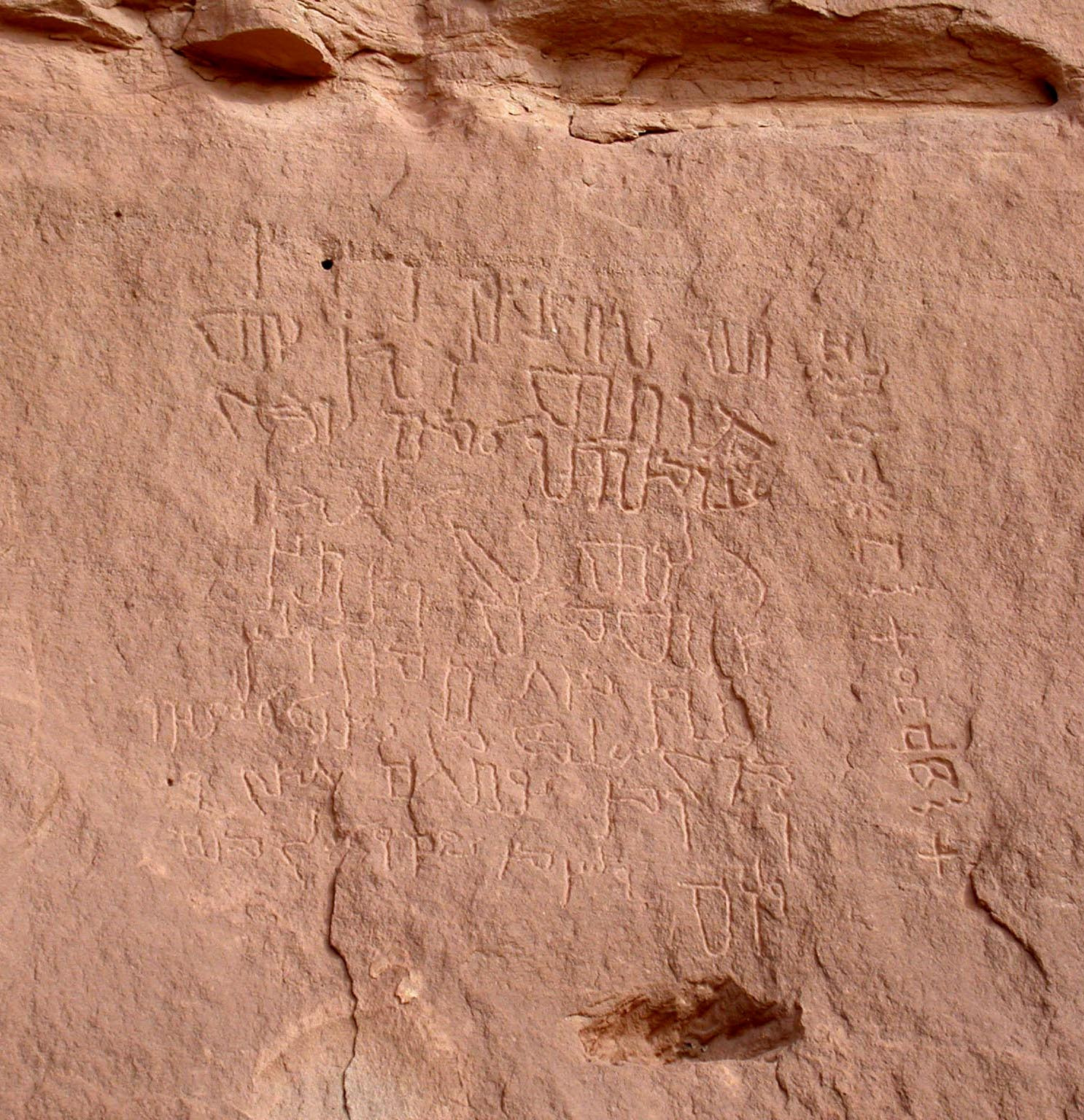
Epitaph of Raqosh (Nabataean and Thamudic D inscriptions)

JSNab 17 or the epitaph of Raqosh is a funerary inscription from Mada'in Salih, Saudi Arabia. It is dated to 267 AD and written in a mix of Nabataean Aramaic and Arabic. Besides the language, it is notable for the use of the possibly monotheistic epithet mry ʕlmʔ 'the Lord of the World'. The Nabataean inscription is accompanied by a shorter one in Thamudic D.

== Text and translation ==
The inscription can be read as follows:

1. dnh qbrw ṣnʕh kʕbw br
2. ḥdtt lrqwš brt
3. ʕbdmnrtw ʔmh why
4. hlkt py ʔlḥgrw
5. šnt mʔh wštyn
6. wtnyn byrḥ tmwz wlʕn
7. mry ʕlmʔ mn yšnʔ ʔlqbrw
8. dʔ wmn yptḥh ḥšy w
9. wldh wlʕn mn ybrw yʕly mnh

The following translation can be presented (from Cantineau translated here from French):

1. This is a tomb which Kaʿabô, son
2. of Aretas made for Raqôš daughter of
3. ʿAbdmanôtô, his mother. She
4. died in Hegra,
5. in the year one-hundred-and-sixty-
6. two, in the month of Tammuz. And may
7. the Lord of the World curse whoever alters this tomb,
8. and whoever opens it, other than
9. her offspring, and may He curse whoever alters what is on it.

O'Connor reads dnh instead of th (1), dy instead of w (8), and yqbr wʔʕly instead of yʕyr dʔ ʕly (9). This yields:

1. As for this grave/This is a grave, which Kaʿb
2. bar Haritat made for Raqāsh berat
3. ʿAbd-Manāt, his mother. And she
4. died in al-Hijr
5. (in the) year one-hundred-sixty-
6. two in the month of Tammuz. And may
7. Marē ʿAlma curse him who alters this tomb
8. or open it, save for
9. him whom he (Kaʿb) has begotten/his progeny. And may he curse anyone who buries (anyone else in it) or exhumes (anyone) from it."

== Language ==
Referring to the mixing of Aramaic and Arabic, O'Connor states that "the Raqāsh Epitaph is closer to being a polyglot puzzle than Nabatean plain text".
