= Nabataean Aramaic =

Western dialect of Aramaic used by the Nabateans

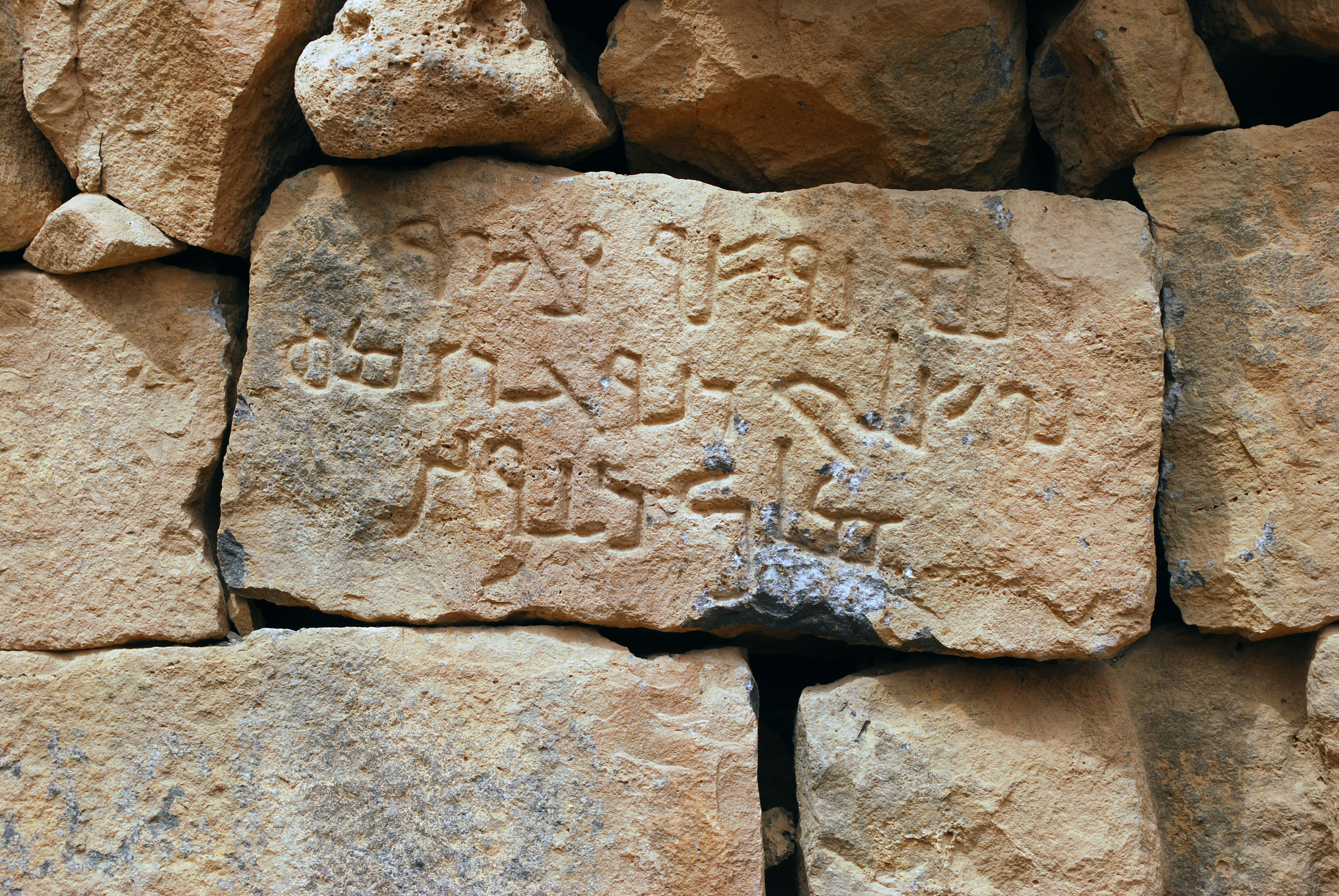
- A third-century AD funerary inscription from Umm al-Jimal, Jordan
- Region: Arabia Petraea
- Extinct: Written form merged with Arabic during the early Islamic era c. AD 650.
- Language family: Afro-Asiatic: Semitic; West Semitic; Central Semitic; Northwest Semitic; Aramaic; Western; Nabataean Aramaic
- Early forms: Proto-Afroasiatic: Proto-Semitic; Old Aramaic; Middle Aramaic; Western Middle Aramaic
- Writing system: Nabataean script

Language codes
- ISO 639-3: None (mis)
- Glottolog: naba1259

Nabataean Aramaic is the extinct Aramaic variety used in inscriptions by the Nabataean Arabs of Transjordan, Northwestern Arabia, the Negev, and the Sinai Peninsula. Compared with other varieties of Aramaic, it is notable for the occurrence of a number of loanwords and grammatical borrowings from Arabic or other North Arabian languages.

Attested from the 2nd century BC onwards in several dozen longer dedicatory and funerary inscriptions and a few legal documents from the period of the Nabataean Kingdom, Nabataean Aramaic remained in use for several centuries after the kingdom's annexation by the Roman Empire in 106 AD. Over time, the distinctive Nabataean script was increasingly used to write texts in the Arabic language. As a result, its latest stage gave rise to the earliest form of the Arabic script, known as Nabataeo-Arabic.

The phonology of Nabataean Aramaic can only be reconstructed in part, based on the mostly consonantal Nabataean script and comparison with other kinds of Aramaic. Similarly, its morphology and syntax are incompletely attested, but are mostly comparable to other varieties of Aramaic from this period. The Nabataean lexicon is also largely Aramaic in origin, with notable borrowings from Arabic, Greek, and other languages.

== History ==
=== Origin and linguistic classification ===
With the collapse of the Achaemenid Empire (330s BC), Aramaic lost importance as the lingua franca of the Near East. Koine Greek now appeared beside it. The formerly unified written culture fell apart into local schools and the old vernaculars now also increased in importance as written languages.

Nabataean Aramaic was one of these local varieties. The language of the Nabataean inscriptions, attested from the second century BCE, is close to the Imperial Aramaic of the Achaemenid Empire but with local developments. Of the few innovations compared to Imperial Aramaic, the use of the object marker yt is a Western Aramaic feature, although the older form ʔyt already occurs in Old Aramaic. Since Nabataean Aramaic also does not participate in innovations typical of Eastern Aramaic, it is commonly assigned to Western Aramaic.

=== Attestation ===
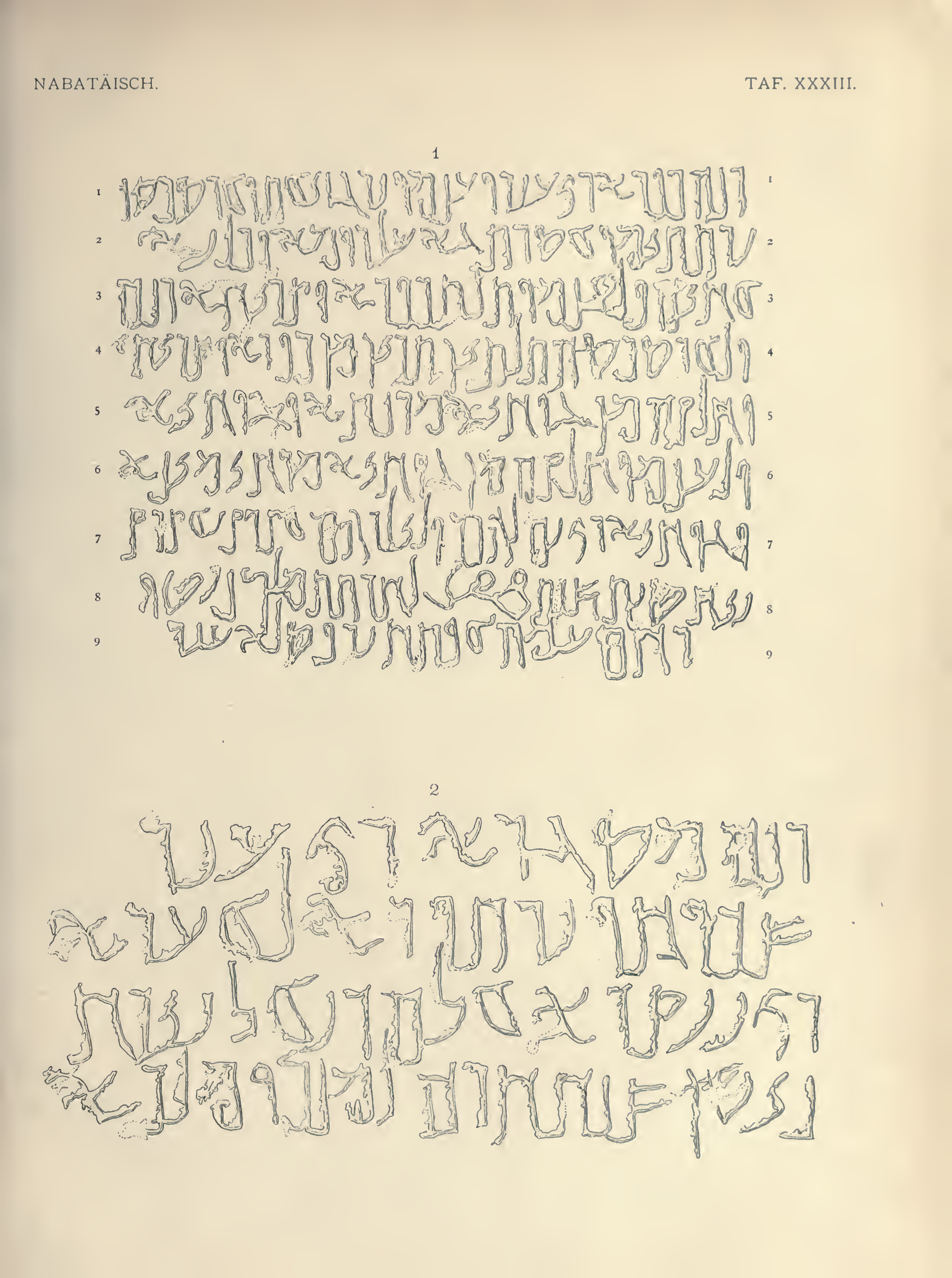
Tracings of Nabataean Aramaic inscriptions marking a tomb (kpr, top) and a sacred site (msgd, bottom) dated to the reigns of ḥrtt rḥm ʕmh (Aretas IV Philopatris) and mlkw (Malichus), respectively

Evidence of Nabataean writings can be found in the burial and dedicatory inscriptions of the cities of Petra, Bosra and Hegra (Mada'in Salih). Many shorter inscriptions have been found in the southern Sinai Peninsula as well as other areas that were at one point ruled by the Nabataean kings. Several Nabataean texts written on papyrus were found at Nahal Hever.

The oldest Nabataean inscription was found in Elusa, in the Negev. The inscription mentions "Aretas, king of the Nabataeans", interpreted by Joseph Naveh as Aretas I, an Arab ruler with whom the Jewish high priest Jason reputedly sought refuge in Petra in 169 BC. This inscription lacks some of the Nabataean features and resembles uniform Imperial Aramaic and Jewish script. Therefore, some scholars propose that the earliest Nabataean inscription is one found in Petra, Jordan, which can be dated back to the late Hellenistic era in the years 96 or 95 BC.

Over 4,000 inscriptions have been confirmed to be written in Nabataean Aramaic. The vast majority are engraved on stone, like the Aslah Triclinium inscription from Petra (95 BC), the dedication to the goddess al-Kutbay from Wadi Tumilat (77 BC) and the inscription of Rabbel I from Petra (66 BC). The earliest inscription found to be written in a cursive Nabataean script was unearthed in Horvat Raqiq, close to the city of Beersheba, Israel. This inscription is unique not only because of its age, but also because it was written using ink applied on a large rock. Similarly cursive texts written with ink on papyrus were found as part of the Babatha archive. Some excavations have unearthed inscriptions on metallic objects. Most of such inscriptions were inscribed on metallic coins. Excavations in Wadi Musa in southern Jordan unearthed dozens of bronze fragments with Nabataean inscriptions on them, including a bronze oil burner which attests a well-preserved dedication by a priest and his son to Obodas. This dates to the reign of the Nabataean king Rabbel II Soter, who ruled between the years 70 and 106 AD.

=== Decline ===
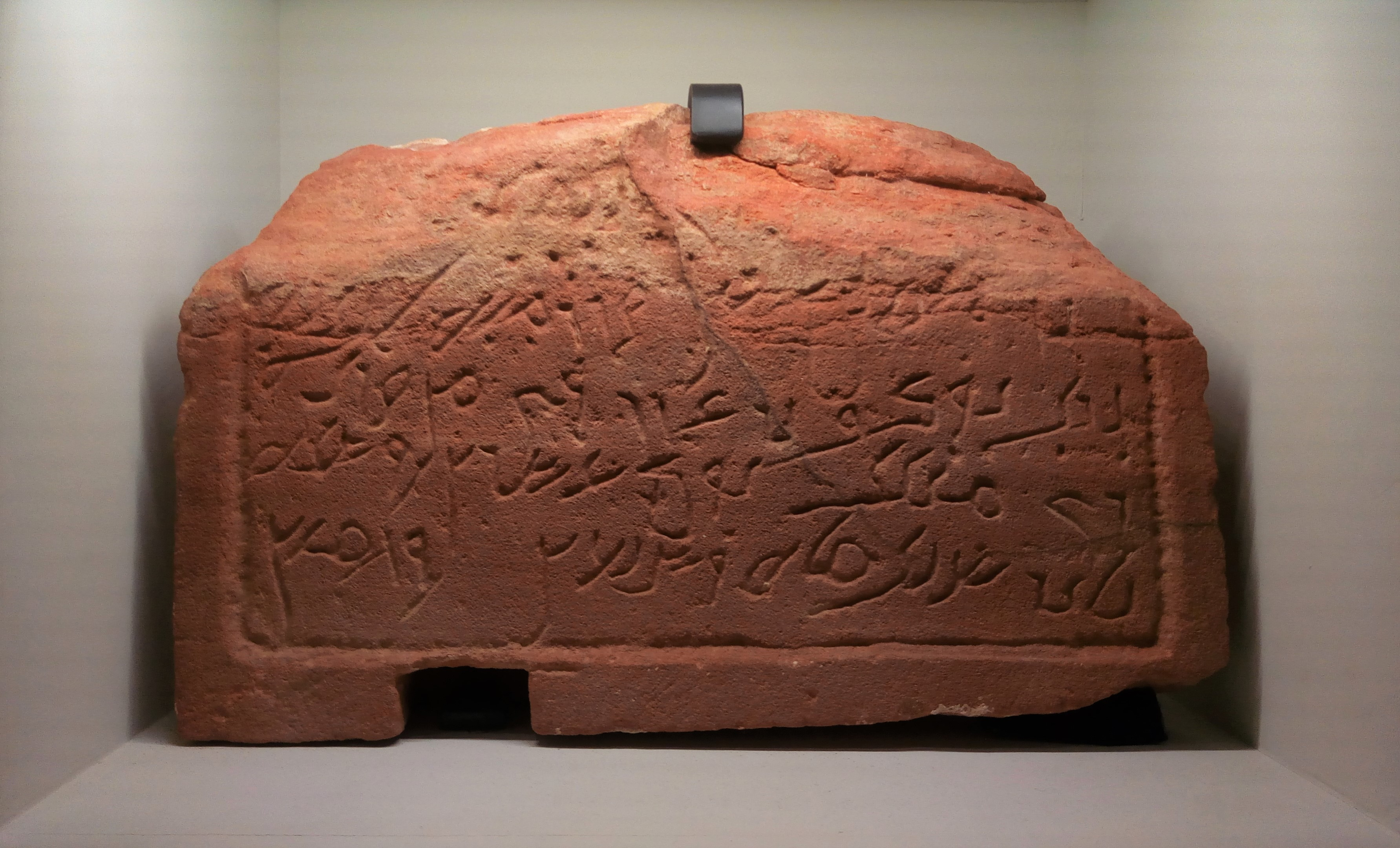
Funerary inscription in Nabataeo-Arabic characters from Al-Ula, 280 AD

From the period of its earliest attestation, Nabataean Aramaic is notable for the use of Arabic or Ancient North Arabian loanwords and grammar, reflecting strong contact with these languages. A first- or second-century AD Nabataean inscription from Ein Avdat even contains three lines of Arabic poetry, of debated meaning. From the third century onwards, the Nabataean script was increasingly used to write the Arabic language. Prominent examples include the mixed Aramaic-Arabic epitaph of RQWŠ daughter of ʕBDMWNTW (JSNab 17) and the entirely Arabic Namara inscription.

According to Jean Cantineau, this marked the beginning of the end of the widespread use of Nabataean Aramaic, which came to be replaced by Arabic. During this process, "Nabataean seems to have emptied itself little by little of the Aramaic elements it had and to have successively replaced them with Arabic loans". This theory, while widely acknowledged, is contested. Michael Patrick O'Connor has questioned alleged Arabic loanwords identified by Cantineau, stating that loanwords are largely restricted to technical terms. More recently, Aaron Butts has argued that the use of Aramaic in the tomb inscriptions of Hegra in the north of Saudi Arabia reflects imperfect learning by native speakers of a North Arabian language.

Nabataean Aramaic continued to be written for several centuries during this rise of Arabic written in the Nabataean script. The longer texts from this period mainly concern a few funerary inscriptions from North Arabian oasis towns. Based on the high number of Hebrew-derived names these contain, they may have been commissioned by members of local Jewish communities. The latest Nabataean inscription found dates back to 356 AD. This was found in Hegra. An even later graffito, dated to 455/6 AD and written in Nabataeo-Arabic characters, was discovered in 2004 at Jabal Umm Jadhayidh in north-western Saudi Arabia, but its Aramaic content is limited to stock formulas, the non-formulaic text being entirely Arabic.

=== Decipherment, documentation and description ===
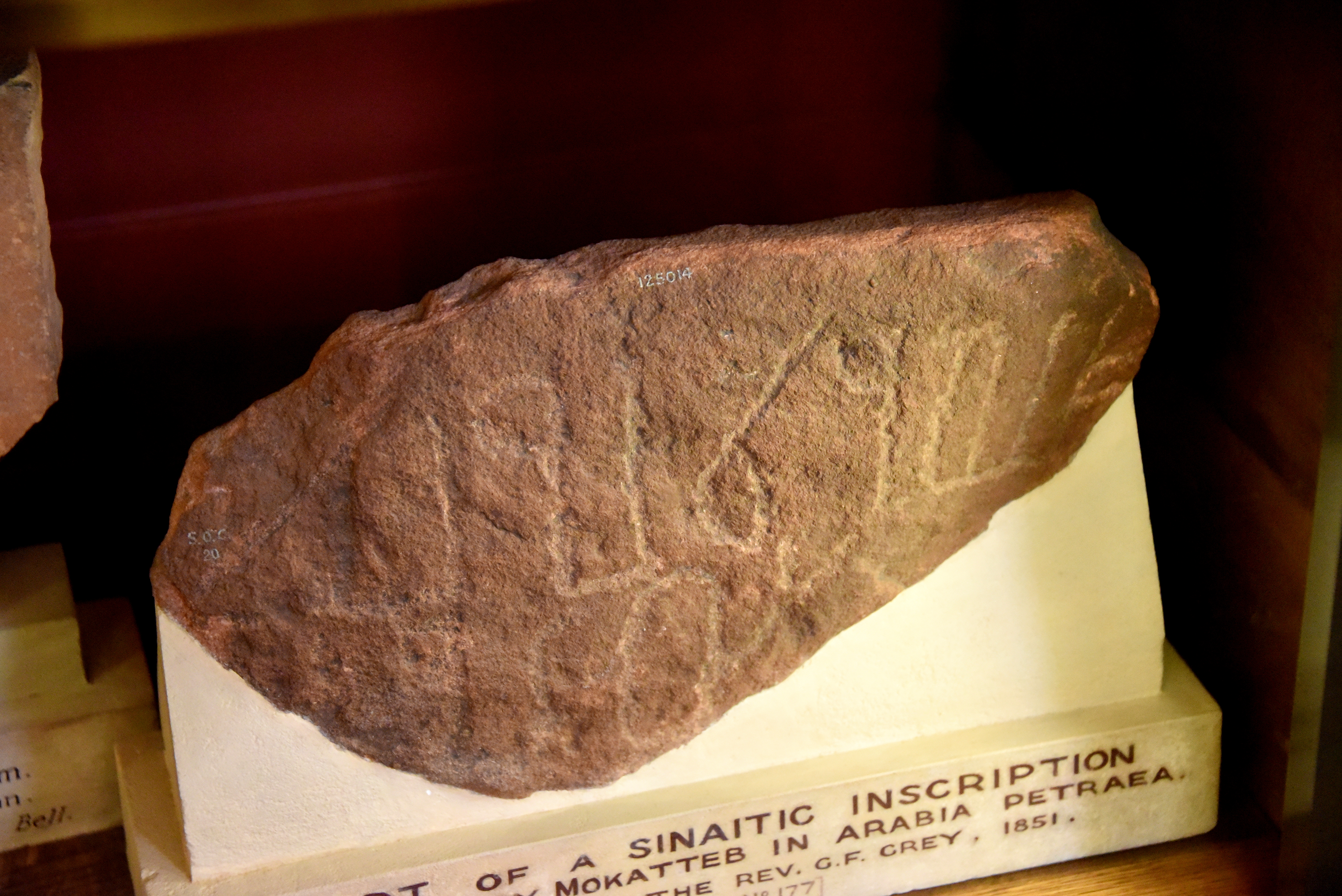
Museum exhibit of a "Sinaitic" graffito from Wadi Mukattab, Egypt

The existence of thousands of Nabataean graffiti in the Sinai desert, originally referred to as "Sinaitic", had long been known. Based on Jean-Jacques Barthélemy's earlier decipherment of the related scripts of Palmyrene, Phoenician, and Imperial Aramaic as represented on the Carpentras Stele, Eduard Friedrich Ferdinand Beer published his reading of the Nabataean script in 1840.

Texts of various length continued to be discovered and published by European scholars during the 19th and 20th century. This period also saw the publication of Cantineau's grammar of Nabataean Aramaic and lexicon with sample texts. Important finds after this publication include the legal documents written on papyrus discovered in the Nahal Hever Cave of Letters in the 1960s. Other publications containing a significant number of texts are the 1993 edition of the tomb inscriptions of Mada'in Saleh by J. Healey and the collection of Nabatean Aramaic–Greek bilingual texts published by G. Petrantoni in 2021. Newly discovered inscriptions continue to be published with great frequency.

== Script ==
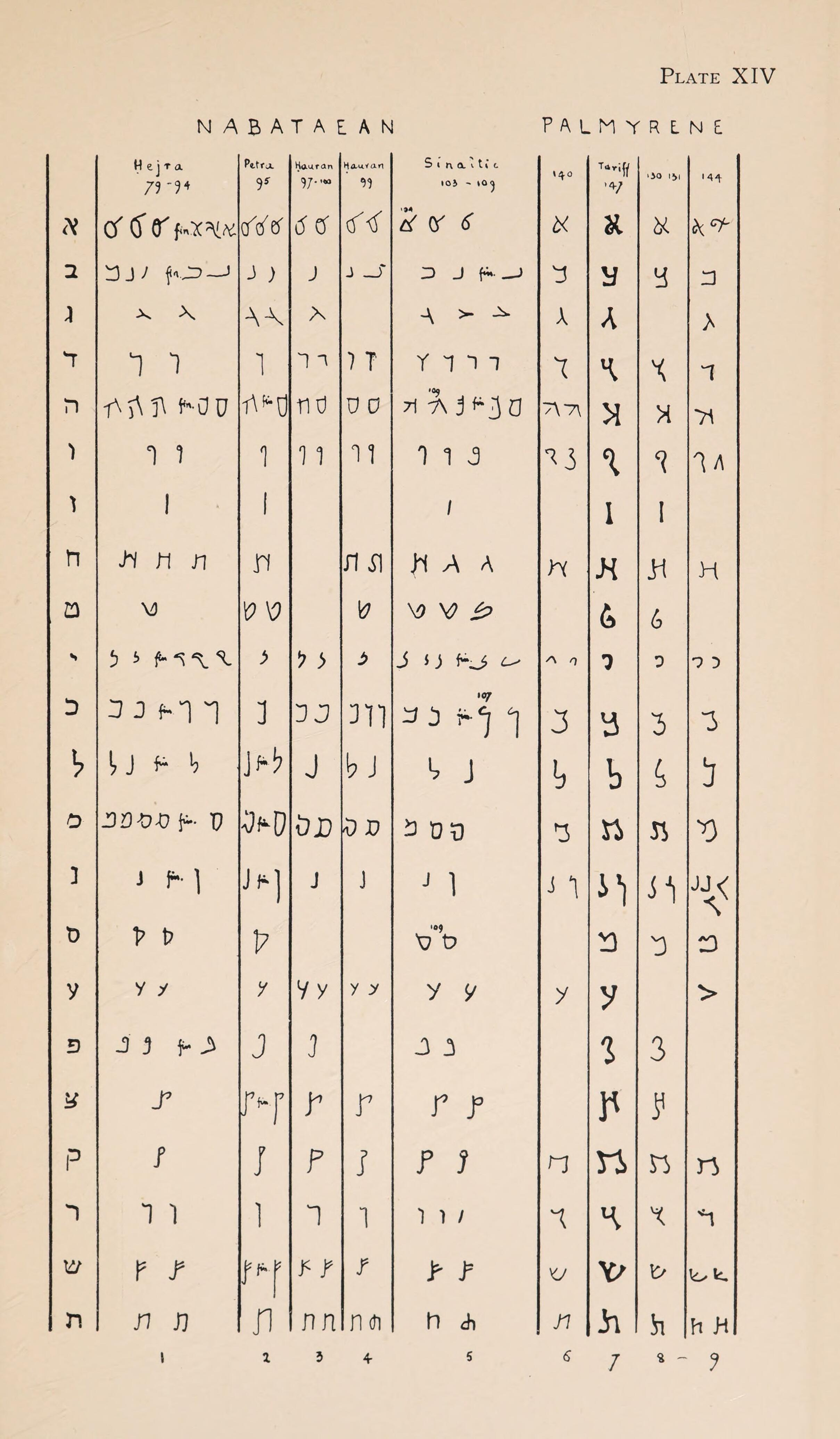
Table showing different versions of the Nabataean script in comparison to Hebrew (leftmost column) and Palmyrene

Nabataean handwriting is characterized by a cursive style. This is even more true for the few known texts that were written with ink, which use a more advanced form of the script. The Nabataean alphabet itself developed out of the Imperial Aramaic alphabet. It became the precursor of the Arabic alphabet, which developed out of cursive variants of the Nabataean script in the 5th century.

Scholars used to be divided over the origins of Arabic script. One (now marginal) school of thought derives the Arabic script from the Syriac script, which also originated in Imperial Aramaic. The second school of thought, led by Theodor Nöldeke, traces Arabic script to Nabataean. This thesis was confirmed by John Healey in his work on the Syriac and the Arabic alphabet.

== Phonology ==
According to Cantineau, Nabataean Aramaic had the following consonantal sounds:

		Labial	Interdental	Alveolar		Lateral	Palatal	Velar	Uvular	Pharyngeal	Glottal
		Labial	Interdental	plain	emp.	Lateral	Palatal	Velar	Uvular	Pharyngeal	Glottal
Nasal		m		n							
Stop	voiceless	p		t	tˤ			k	q		ʔ
Stop	voiced	b		d				ɡ			
Fricative	voiceless	f	θ	s	sˤ	ɬ	ʃ	x	χ?	ħ	h
Fricative	voiced	v	ð	z				ɣ	ʁ?	ʕ	
Approximant						l	j	w			
Trill				r							

In other contemporary dialects of Aramaic, [f], [θ], [x], [v], [ð], and [ɣ] are postvocalic allophones of /p/, /t/, /k/, /b/, /d/, and /g/, respectively, but according to Cantineau, it cannot be established whether this also holds for Nabataean. The voiceless sibilants /s/ and /ʃ/ are sometimes confused in writing. /s/ also interchanges with /ɬ/, which was written with the same sign as /ʃ/ (a practice dating back to the Ancient Aramaic period). Cantineau states that the phonetic value of this sound is uncertain and suggests it may have been palatalized; the realization as a lateral fricative is argued in later scholarship. The evidence for the preservation of the uvular fricatives /χ/ and /ʁ/ or their merger with pharyngeal /ħ/ and /ʕ/ as in later Aramaic is inconclusive.

As the Nabataean script does not indicate short vowels, the only information on vocalic phonemes comes from names in foreign transcription. But these are normally of Arabic origin and do not tell us anything about Nabataean Aramaic. Proto-Aramaic long *ā is sometimes spelled with a mater lectionis w, as in *ʔināš > ʔnwš 'human', *θamānā > tmwnʔ 'eight (m.)'. This may indicate a shift in pronunciation to a rounded ō.

== Morphology ==
=== Pronouns ===
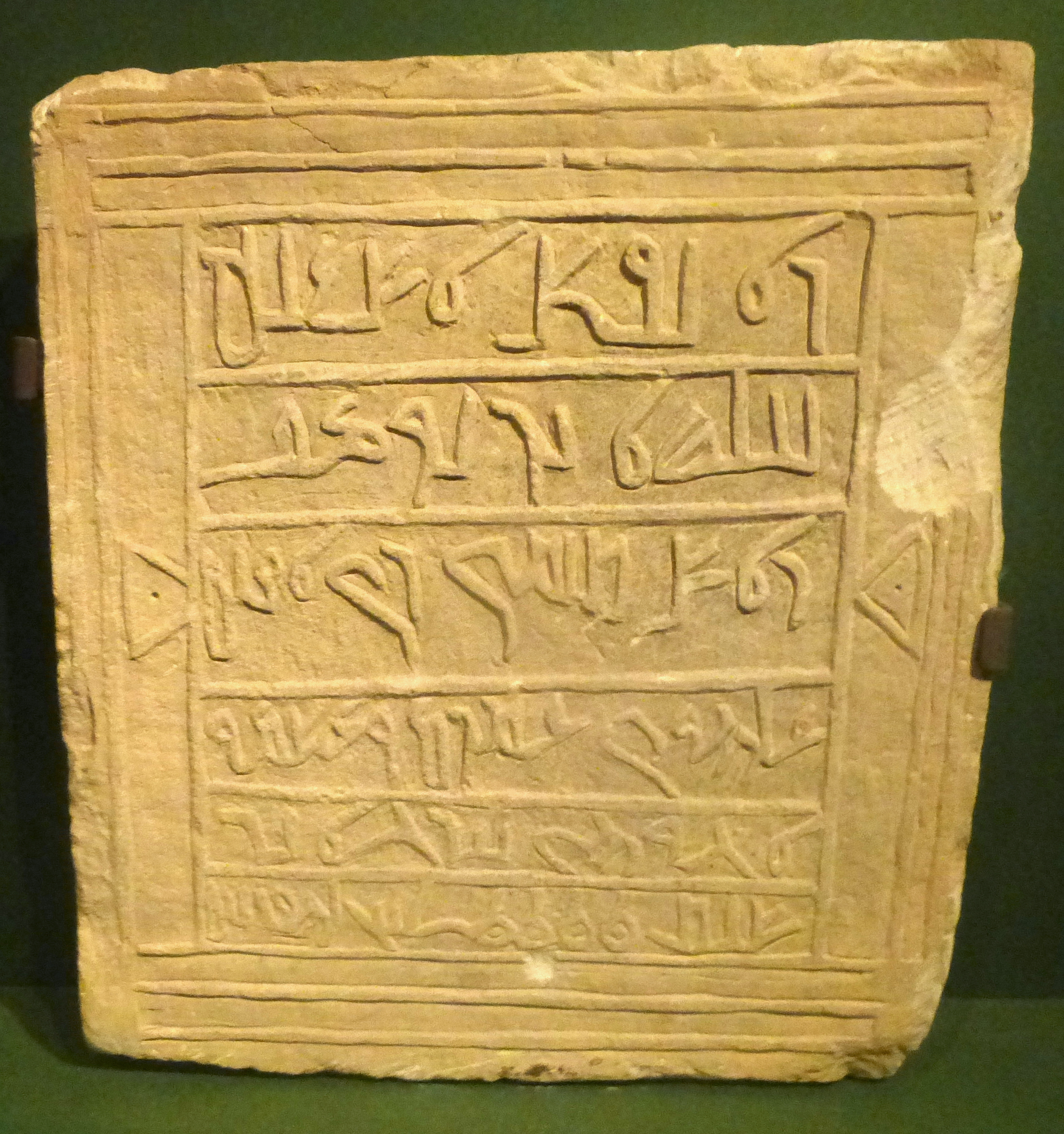
Funerary inscription from Tayma, 203 AD. The inscription features the demonstrative dʔ (first word, top right), the relative particle dy (third line, middle left), and the pronominal suffixes (ʕl)hwy '(over) him' (fourth line, far right) and (ʔḥ)why 'his (brothers)' (fifth line, far right).

The attested third person independent personal pronouns are masculine singular hw (rarely hwʔ), feminine singular hy, and masculine plural hm. These also function as demonstrative pronouns. The legal documents found in the Dead Sea region also attest the first person singular ʔnh and second person masculine singular ʔnt.

The first person plural suffixed pronoun is -nʔ. Unlike many other dialects of Aramaic which simply have -(a)n, Nabataean preserves the final vowel *-ā here, as indicated by the mater lectionis ʔ. The third person masculine singular suffixed pronoun is normally -h. After long vowels and diphthongs (both marked by matres lectionis), -hy is used instead, as in ʔbwhy 'his father', ywmwhy 'his days'. In later graffiti, this distribution breaks down and other suffixes, -hw and -w, also appear. The third person feminine singular suffixed pronoun is always -h and the third person plural (used both for masculine and feminine) is -hm.

The most common demonstrative pronouns besides hw, hy, and hm are masculine singular dnh (rarely znh), feminine singular dʔ, and plural ʔlh. Other, rarely attested, plural forms are ʔlk and ʔnw. In the later period, the gender distinction in the singular breaks down and both forms occur with both masculine and feminine antecedents. The relative particle is zy in the oldest inscriptions and dy elsewhere; it does not inflect. The relative particle introduces relative clauses, as in dʔ msgdʔ dy ʕbd ʕbydw 'this is the sacred stone which ʕBYDW made', and can express a genitive relation, as in dnʔ ṣlmʔ dy ʕbdt ʔlhʔ 'this is the statue of Obodas the god'. Finally, the attested interrogative and indefinite pronouns are mn 'who' and mh 'what'.

=== Verbs ===
Like other Semitic languages, Nabataean Aramaic attests various (basic and derived) verb stems. Based on comparison with other varieties of Aramaic, it is likely that active verbs could occur as G-stems (basic stem), D-stems (intensive stem, characterized by different vowels and gemination of the second radical), or C-stems (causative stem, characterized by different vowels and a prefix). Due to the limitations of the Nabataean alphabet, the G- and D-stem are not distinguished in writing: cf. ʕbd 'he made' (G-stem), qrb 'he approached' (D-stem). The suffix conjugation (see below) of the C-stem is marked by a prefixed h-, as in hqym 'he erected', or ʔ-, as in ʔqymw 'they erected'; the prefix conjugation cannot be distinguished in writing from the G- or D-stem.

Mediopassive stems are derived from the G- and D-stems. These are marked by a prefixed -t-; all the examples Cantineau mentions are prefix conjugation forms (see below), such as ytptḥ 'it will be opened' (tG-stem), ytʔlp 'he will compose for himself' (tD-stem). Unlike in some other kinds of Aramaic, verbs with a sibilant first radical prefix the -t- or infix it without voicing or emphatic assimilation: ytzbn and yztbn 'it will be sold'; these kinds of forms also occur in contemporary texts from the Dead Sea region, however. The late form mqtry (for earlier mtqrʔ) 'called (m.sg.)' shows Arabic-like infixation of -t- after a non-sibilant first radical, although the form cannot have been borrowed from Arabic in its entirety. A purely passive form is marked by a mater lectionis -y- between the second and third radical, as in dkyr 'remembered (be) (m.sg.)'. This is sometimes inflected as an adjective, as in dkyryn 'remembered (m.pl.)' but can also be inflected according to the suffix conjugation, as in ʕbydt 'it (f.) was made'.

Two finite conjugations can be distinguished: the suffix conjugation, which exclusively marks its subject agreement through suffixation, and the prefix conjugation, which uses both suffixes and prefixes. Attested suffix conjugation endings include -t (third person feminine singular and second person masculine singular) and -w (third person plural for both genders); the third person masculine singular is unmarked. Examples include ʕbd 'he made', ʕbdt 'she made', ʕbdw 'they made', and qrʔt 'you (m.sg.) called'. The subject markers for the third person prefix conjugation are y- (third person masculine singular), t- (third person feminine singular), and y-...-wn (third person (masculine?) plural), as in yʕbd 'he will make', tʕbd 'she will make', and yktbwn 'they will write'. Besides these finite conjugations, Nabataean Aramaic verbs form an infinitive. The G-stem infinitive is formed with a prefixed m-, as in mktb 'to write'. The G-stem active participle does not have any special affixes and has a stem like rḥm 'loving (m.sg.)'. As noted above, the G-stem passive participle is formed like dkyr 'remembered (m.sg.)'. In late graffiti, the form mdk(w)r 'remembered (m.sg.)' also occurs, a pattern which is borrowed from Arabic. The participles (both active and passive) of the derived stems are formed by prefixing an m-, but examples are scarce.

=== Nouns and prepositions ===
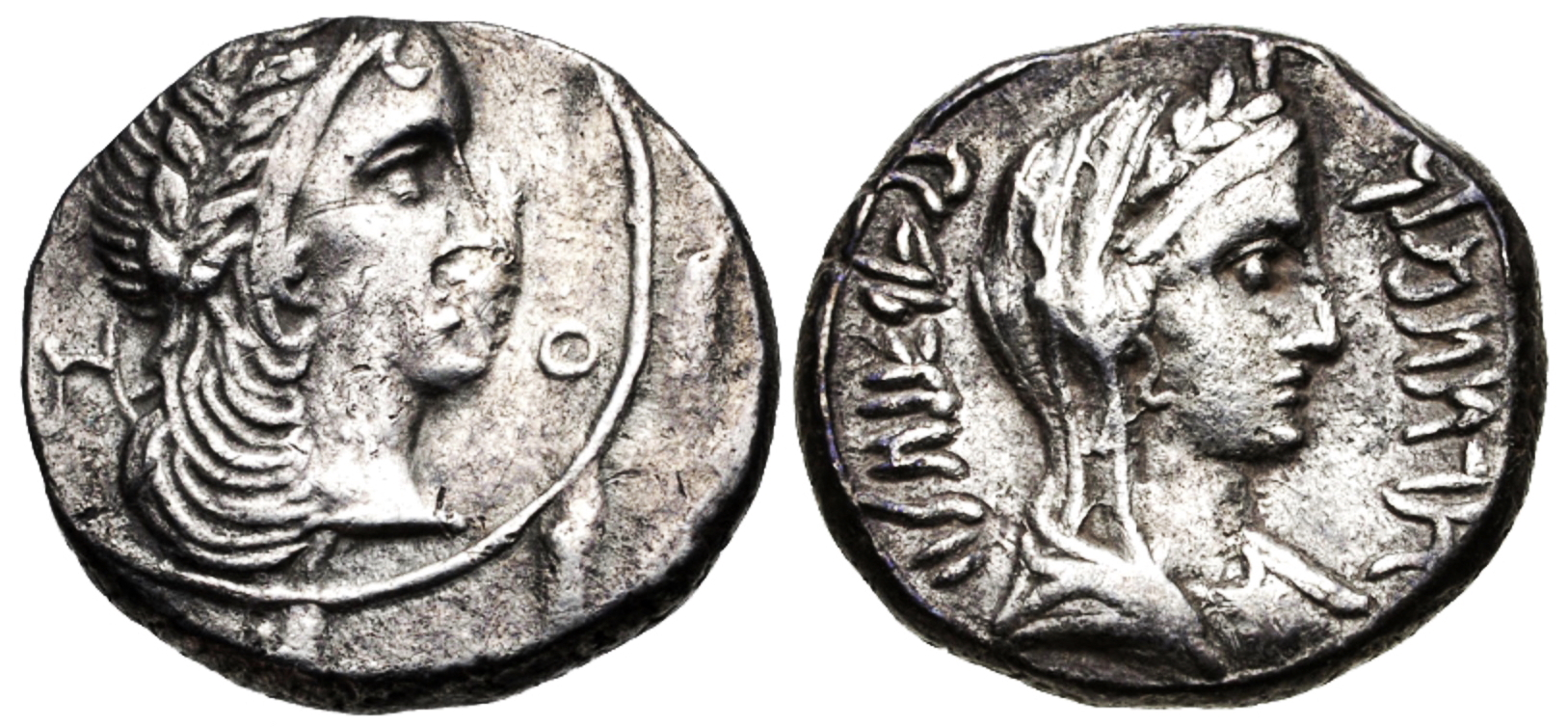
A Nabataean coin of Aretas IV Philopatris from c. 2 BC. The inscription reads ḥrtt mlk nbṭw šnt 5+1+1 'Aretas, king of Nabataea, Year 7'. The nouns mlk 'king of' and šnt 'year (of)' are in the construct state.

Nouns distinguish two genders, masculine and feminine; two numbers, singular and plural; and three states, absolute, construct, and emphatic. Feminine nouns may be marked by a feminine suffix (-h, -w, -y) or unmarked. The masculine is always unmarked.

Various endings express the combination of number and state. The feminine suffix -h is replaced by -t in the construct state, which expresses possession by a following noun or suffixed pronoun. -t is also added in the construct state after the feminine suffixes -w and -y. In other words, the construct is identical to the absolute state in the singular. One set of plural endings consists of absolute -yn (rarely -n), construct -y (which changes to -w- before the suffix -hy), used for masculine and some feminine nouns. For other feminine nouns, the construct plural form is written the same as the construct singular form (although the plural was probably marked by a long ā vowel, as in -āt-, that was absent in the singular; this is not expressed in the writing); based on other varieties of Aramaic, the expected absolute suffix for these nouns is -n, but this is unattested. Finally, the emphatic state, expressing definiteness, is formed by adding the suffix -ʔ to the construct state. The full paradigm is thus (example forms are of mlk 'king' and mlkh 'queen'; not all forms are actually attested):

Gender/number	Absolute	Construct	Emphatic
Masculine singular	mlk	mlk	mlkʔ
Masculine plural	mlkyn	mlky	mlkyʔ
Feminine singular	mlkh	mlkt	mlktʔ
Feminine plural	*mlkn	mlkt	mlktʔ

Frequent prepositions include b- 'in', l- 'to, for, of', k- 'according to', mn 'from', and ʕl 'on, about'. These can take pronominal suffixes, as in bh 'in it', lhm 'to them'. ʕl is inflected as a plural before suffixes, as in ʕlwhy over him, ʕlyhm 'over them'.

== Syntax ==
Of the two finite verb conjugations, the suffix conjugation can express the past tense, as in dnh kprʔ dy ʕbd ... 'this is the grave which ... made', and the optative, as in wlʕnw dwšrʔ wmnwtw wqyšh ... 'and may Dushara and Manat and Qayshah curse ...'. The prefix conjugation expresses the future tense, as in wmn ybʕʔ ... 'and whoever shall want ...' and can be used modally as a subjunctive, as in ... dy tʕbd bh ... '... so that she make of it ...', conditional, as in hn yhwʔ ... bḥgrʔ 'if ... be in Hegra', or optative, like the suffix conjugation, as in wylʕn dwšrʔ wmnwtw ... 'and may Dushara and Manat curse ...'. While the pronominal direct object of a verb is rarely expressed by a suffixed pronoun attached to the verb, normally it is attached to the following object marker yt.

If a sentence includes a verb, the normal word order is verb—subject—object(s), as in lʕnw (V) dwšrʔ wmnwtw wqyšh (S) kl mn dy ... (O) 'may Dushara and Manat and Qayshah curse anyone who ...'. If a sentence does not include a verb, the sentence is copular. It then consists of two noun phrases which make up the subject and predicate, as in dnh (S) kprʔ ... (P) 'this is the grave ...'. Clauses can be coordinated by the conjunction w- 'and, but'. Most forms of subordinate clauses are introduced by the particle dy. Conditional clauses are introduced by hn 'if'.

== Lexicon ==
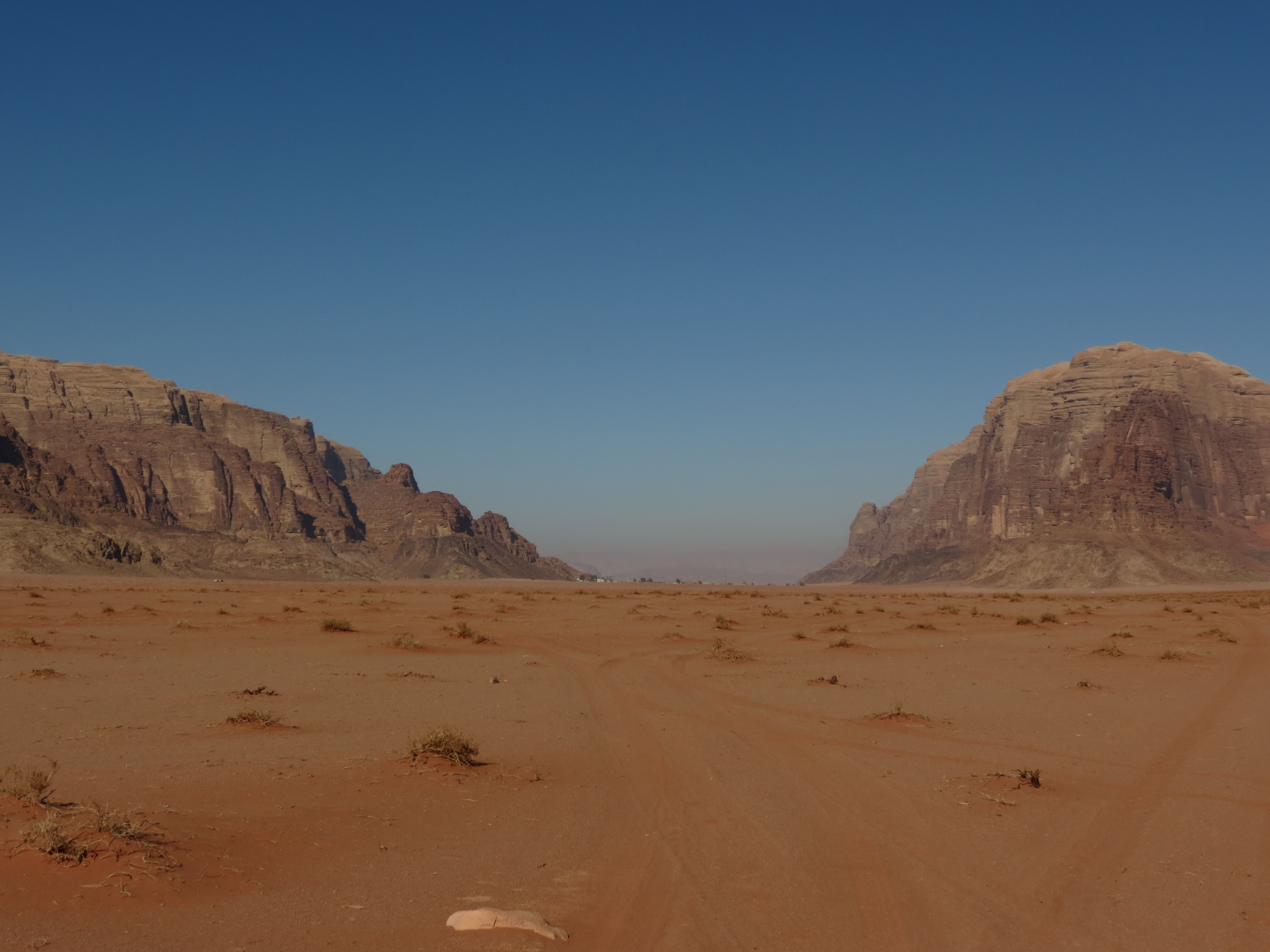
Among other loanwords from Arabic, the Nabataean papyri attest the term wdyʔ 'the wadi'

Most of the Nabataean basic vocabulary was inherited from older Aramaic. Examples of these inherited words include ʔb 'father', ʔm 'mother', br 'son', brt 'daughter', dkr 'male', and nqbh 'female'. Loanwords, however, are also common. Arabic and Ancient North Arabian loanwords have received special attention. Words like ʔṣdq 'heir' and kpr 'tomb' may have been borrowed from Dadanitic. Words thought to have been borrowed from Arabic include ḥlyqh 'custom' (Arabic ḫalīqah), lʕn 'to curse' (Arabic laʕana), and ʕyr 'other than' (Arabic ġayr). The Nabataean kingdom's contacts with Hellenistic states and Rome also led to the borrowing of certain Greek words, such as ʔsrtg 'general' (Greek stratēgós). Some of these ultimately come from Latin, like qysr 'Caesar'. From earlier stages of Aramaic, Nabataean inherited a few loanwords from Akkadian: the attested borrowings are ʔpkl (a kind of priest; Akkadian apkallu, ultimately from Sumerian abgal) and šyzb 'to save' (Akkadian šūzubu).

== Sample texts ==
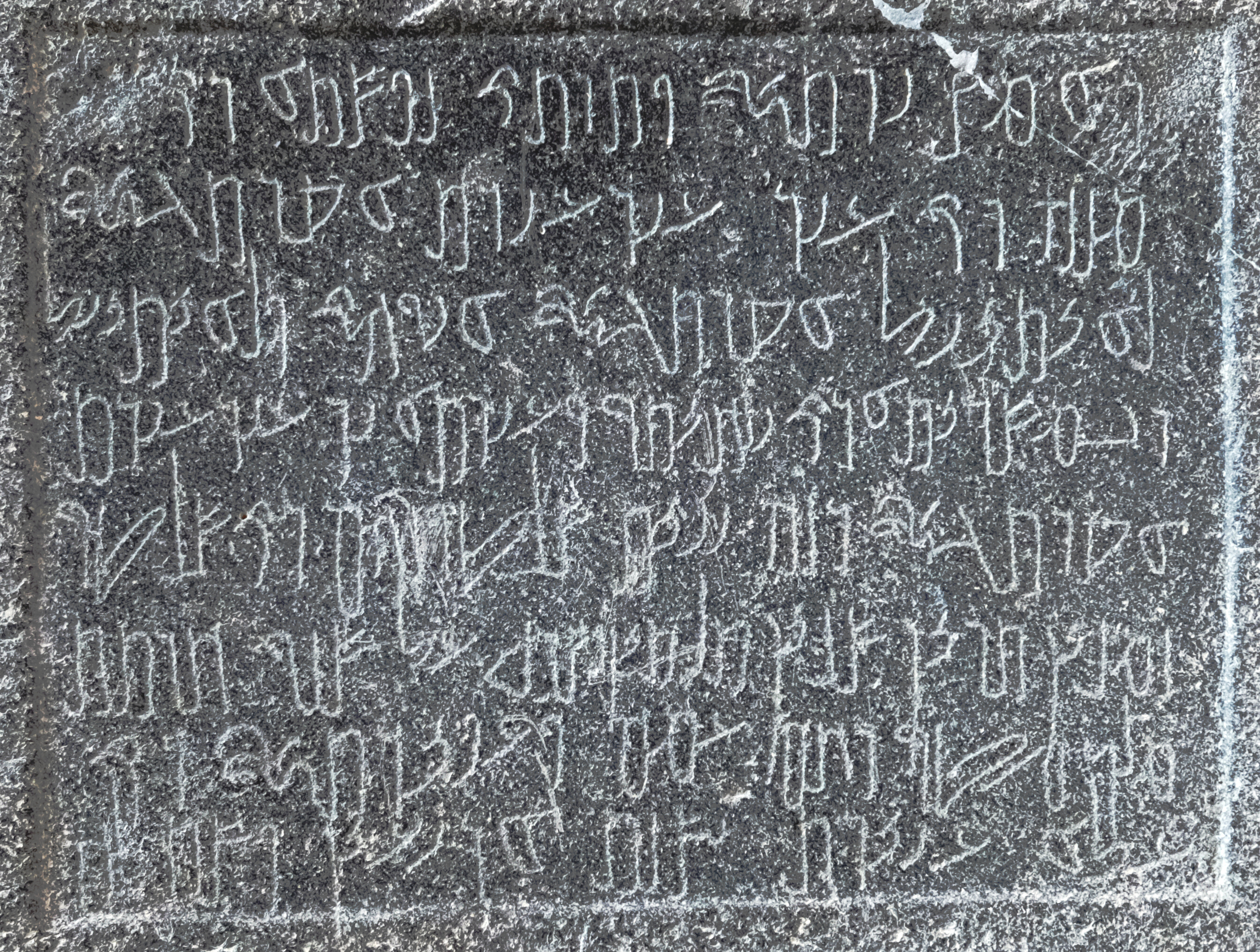
Funerary inscription from Madaba, Jordan, 37 AD

Itaybel tomb inscription, Madaba, 37 AD (pictured):
1	dʔ mqbrtʔ wtrty npštʔ dy	'This is the tomb and the two funerary monuments which
2	ʕlʔ mnh dy ʕbd ʕbdʕbdt ʔsrtgʔ	are above it which Abdobodat the general made
3	lʔytybl ʔsrtgʔ ʔbwhy wlʔytybl	for Itaybel the general, his father, and for Itaybel
4	rb mšrytʔ dy blḥytw wʕbdtʔ br ʕbdʕbdt	the chief of the camp which is in LḤYTW and ʕBDTʔ, son of (5) the aforementioned (4) Abdobodat
5	ʔsrtgʔ dnh bbyt šlṭwnhm dy šlṭw	the general in the seat of their authority, which they held
6	zmnyn tryn šnyn tltyn wšt ʕl šny ḥrtt	two times for thirty-six years during the years of Harethat,
7	mlk nbṭw rḥm ʕmh wʕbydtʔ dy	King of Nabataea, Lover of his People. And the work which
8	ʕlʔ ʕbydt bšnt ʔrbʕyn wšt lh	is above was done in his forty-sixth year.'

Mawiyyah tomb inscription, Mada'in Salih, 356 AD:
1	dnh ...š...brtʔ dy ...	'This is ... which ...
2	ʕdy... br ḥny br šmwʔl ryš	ʕDY[WN] son of ḤNY son of ŠMWʔL {chief citizen} of
3	ḥgrʔ ʕl mwyh ʔtth brt	Hegra for [lit. over] Mawiyyah his wife, daughter of
4	ʕmrw br ʕdywn br šmwʔl	ʕMRW son of ʕDYWN son of ŠMWʔL
5	ryš tymʔ dy mytt byrḥ	chief citizen of Tayma, who died in the month of
6	ʔb šnt mʔtyn wḥmšyn	Ab in the year two hundred and fifty-
7	wʔḥdy brt šnyn tltyn	one [AD 356] at the age of thirty-
8	wtmny	eight.'

== See also ==
- Palmyrene Aramaic
- Old Arabic

== Sources ==
- Al-Najem, Mohammed; Macdonald, M.C.A. (2009). "A New Nabataean Inscription from Taymā'". Arabian Archaeology and Epigraphy. 20 (2): 208–217. doi:10.1111/j.1600-0471.2009.00316.x.
- Barkay, Rachel (2015). "Nabataean Queens as Reflected on Coins" (PDF). Israel Numismatic Journal. 19: 13–32. Archived from the original (PDF) on 2023-06-27.
- Beer, E. F. F. (1840). Studia Asiatica III: Inscriptiones veteres litteris et lingua hucusque incognitis ad Montem Sinai in magno numero servatae. Leipzig: Barth. OCLC 36300886.
- Butts, Aaron M. (2018). "North Arabian Features in the Nabataean Aramaic Inscriptions from Madāʼin Ṣāliḥ: A Contact-Linguistic Analysis" (PDF). In Brooke, George J.; Curtis, Adrian H. W.; al-Hamad, Muntasir; Smith, G. Rex (eds.). Near Eastern and Arabian Essays: Studies in Honour of John F. Healey. Journal of Semitic Studies Supplement 41. Oxford: Oxford University Press. pp. 39–57. ISBN 9780198831068. OCLC 1061805149. Archived (PDF) from the original on 2023-03-06.
- Cantineau, J. (1930). Le Nabatéen. Vol. 1. Paris: Librairie Ernest Leroux. OCLC 758276088.
- Cantineau, J. (1932). Le Nabatéen. Vol. 2. Paris: Librairie Ernest Leroux. OCLC 1277364862.
- Cooke, G. A. (1903). A Text-book of North-Semitic Inscriptions. Oxford: Clarendon. OCLC 457996563.
- Daniels, Peter T. (2020). "The Decipherment of Ancient Near Eastern Languages". In Hasselbach-Andee, Rebecca (ed.). A Companion to Ancient Near Eastern Languages. Wiley: Wiley. pp. 3–25. doi:10.1002/9781119193814.ch1. ISBN 9781119193296. OCLC 1119113369. S2CID 216164367.
- Graf, David F. (2003). "Nabateans". In Richard, Suzanne Louise (ed.). Near Eastern Archaeology: A Reader. Winona Lake, IN: Eisenbrauns. pp. 434–439. ISBN 9781575060835. OCLC 52377536.
- Gzella, Holger (2015). A Cultural History of Aramaic. From the Beginnings to the Advent of Islam. Leiden: Brill. ISBN 9789004285095. OCLC 890912561.
- al-Hamad, Muntasir (2018). "Revisiting the Arabic Verses of the ʽAin ʽAvdat Inscription". In Brooke, George J.; Curtis, Adrian H. W.; al-Hamad, Muntasir; Smith, G. Rex (eds.). Near Eastern and Arabian Essays: Studies in Honour of John F. Healey. Journal of Semitic Studies Supplement 41. Oxford: Oxford University Press. pp. 159–168. ISBN 9780198831068. OCLC 1061805149.
- Healey, John F. (1989). "Were the Nabataeans Arabs?". ARAM. 1 (1): 38–44.
- Healey, John F. (1990). Reading the past: The Early Alphabet. London: British Museum Publications. ISBN 9780520073098. Archived from the original on 2023-02-28.
- Healey, John F. (1993). The Nabataean Tomb Inscriptions of Mada'in Salih. Oxford: Oxford University Press. ISBN 9780199221622. OCLC 246838368.
- Healey, John F. (2021). "Were the Nabataeans Arabs?". ARAM. 33 (1&2): 361–366. Reprint of Healey (1989).
- Hoyland, Robert G. (2011). "The Jews of the Hijaz in the Qurʾān". In Reynolds, Gabriel S. (ed.). New Perspectives on the Qur'ān. The Qur'ān in Its Historical Context 2. Routledge Studies in the Qur’ān. Oxford: Routledge. pp. 91–116. ISBN 9780415615488. OCLC 1349550650.
- Kaufman, Stephen A. (1974). The Akkadian Influences on Aramaic. Assyriological Studies 19. Chicago: University of Chicago Press. ISBN 9780226622811. OCLC 1495566.
- Lidzbarski, Mark (1898). Handbuch der nordsemitischen Epigraphik. Weimar: Emil Felber. OCLC 912964363.
- Meshorer, Ya'akov (1975). "Nabataean Coins". Qedem. 3: 1–112.
- Morgenstern, Matthew (1999). "The History of the Aramaic Dialects in the Light of Discoveries from the Judaean Desert: The Case of Nabataean". Eretz-Israel. 29: 134*–142*.
- Naveh, Joseph (2003). "Nabatean Language, Script and Inscriptions" (PDF). In Rosenthal-Heginbottom, Renate (ed.). The Nabateans in the Negev. Haifa: Reuben and Edith Hecht Museum, University of Haifa. pp. 15*–16*. ISBN 9789657034125. OCLC 59276262. Archived (PDF) from the original on 2022-11-21.
- Nehmé, Laïla (2017). "Aramaic or Arabic? The Nabataeo-Arabic Script and the Language of the Inscriptions Written in this Script". In Al-Jallad, Ahmad (ed.). Arabic in Context. Celebrating 400 years of Arabic at Leiden University. Leiden: Brill. pp. 75–98. ISBN 9789004343030. OCLC 967854618.
- Nehmé, Laïla (2018). "The Nabataean and Nabataeo-Arabic Inscriptions". In Nehmé, Laïla (ed.). The Darb al-Bakrah. A Caravan Route in North-West Arabia Discovered by Ali I. al-Ghabban. Catalogue of the Inscriptions. Riyadh: Saudi Commission for Tourism and National Heritage. pp. 25–224. OCLC 1237187650. Archived from the original on 2022-12-01.
- Nöldeke, Theodor; Euting, Julius; von Gutschmidt, A. (1885). Nabatäische Inschriften aus Arabien. Berlin: Reimer. OCLC 3188090.
- O'Connor, M. (1986). "The Arabic Loanwords in Nabatean Aramaic". Journal of Near Eastern Studies. 45 (3): 213–229. doi:10.1086/373188. S2CID 161392170.
- Petrantoni, Giuseppe (2021). Corpus of Nabataean Aramaic-Greek Inscriptions (PDF). Edizioni Ca' Foscari. ISBN 9788869695087. OCLC 1251498280. Archived (PDF) from the original on 2022-11-23.
- Rubin, Aaron D. (2008). "The Subgrouping of the Semitic Languages". Language and Linguistics Compass. 2 (1): 61–84. doi:10.1111/j.1749-818X.2007.00044.x.
- al-Salameen, Zeyad; Shdaifat, Younis (2014). "A New Nabataean Inscribed Bronze Lamp". Arabian Archaeology and Epigraphy. 25 (1): 43–49. doi:10.1111/aae.12035.
- Steiner, Richard C. (1977). The Case for Fricative-laterals in Proto-Semitic. American Oriental Society. OCLC 3440167.
- Stiehl, Ruth (1970). "A New Nabatean Inscription". In Stiehl, Ruth; Stier, Hans Erich (eds.). Beiträge zur Alten Geschichte und deren Nachleben. Festschrift für Franz Altheim zum 6. 10. 1968. Berlin: De Gruyter. pp. 87–90. OCLC 889239864.
- Wilson-Wright, Aren M. (2016). "A Reevaluation of the Semitic Direct Object Markers" (PDF). Hebrew Studies. 57: 7–15. doi:10.1353/hbr.2016.0000. S2CID 171182335.
- Yadin, Yigael; Greenfield, Jonas C.; Yardeni, Ada; Levine, Baruch A. (2002). The Documents from the Bar Kokhba period in the Cave of Letters. Hebrew, Aramaic, and Nabatean-Aramaic Papyri. Jerusalem: Israel Exploration Society. OCLC 152703668.
- Yardeni, Ada (2014). "A List of the Arabic Words Appearing in Nabataean and Aramaic Legal Documents from the Judaean Desert". Scripta Classica Israelica. 33: 301–324. Archived from the original on 2023-02-16.
