= Lion of Al-lāt =

Historical statue in Palmyra, Syria

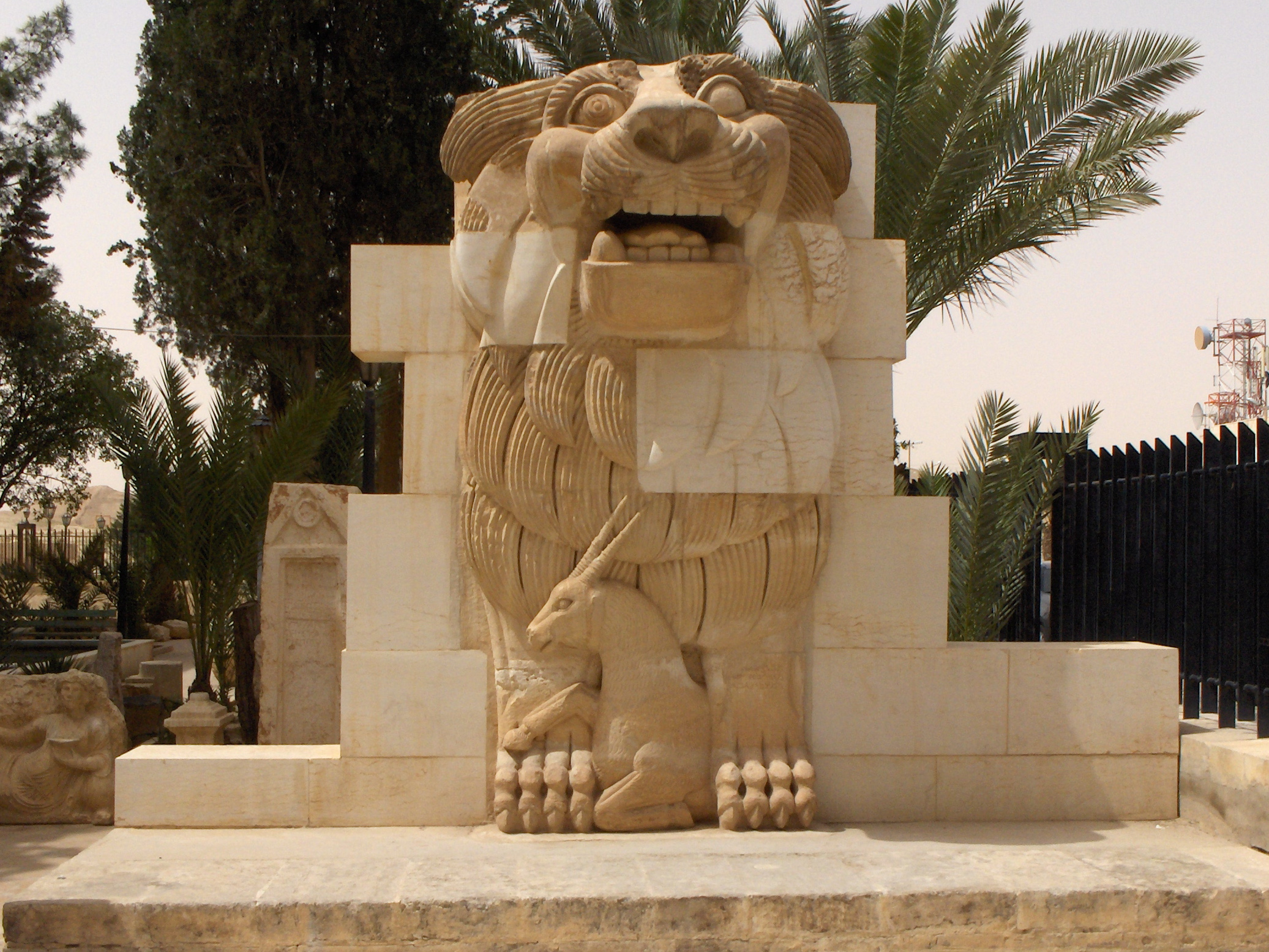
- The Lion of Al-lāt, 2010
- Interactive map of Lion of Al-lāt
- Location: Temple of Al-Lat, Palmyra, Syria
- Coordinates: 34.5542°N 38.2667°E
- Material: Limestone
- Height: 3.5 m (11 ft)
- Completion date: c. 1st century
- Dismantled date: 27 June 2015 (by ISIL)

The Lion of Al-lāt (Arabic: أسد اللات) is an ancient statue that adorned the Temple of Al-Lat in Palmyra, Syria. On 27 June 2015, it was severely damaged by the ISIL after it captured Palmyra. The statue was removed to the National Museum of Damascus and underwent reconstruction work, and now stands again.

3D modeling of the statue as part of the NEWPALMYRA project

== Description ==
The statue, of a lion holding a crouching gazelle, was made from limestone ashlars in the early first century AD and measured 3.5 m (11 ft) in height, weighing 15 tonnes. The lion was regarded as the consort of Al-lāt. The gazelle symbolized Al-lāt's tender and loving traits, as bloodshed was not permitted under penalty of Al-lāt's retaliation. The lion's left paw had a partially damaged Palmyrene inscription (PAT 1122) which reads: tbrk ʾ[lt] (Al-lāt will bless) mn dy lʾyšd (whoever will not shed) dm ʿl ḥgbʾ (blood in the sanctuary).

== History ==
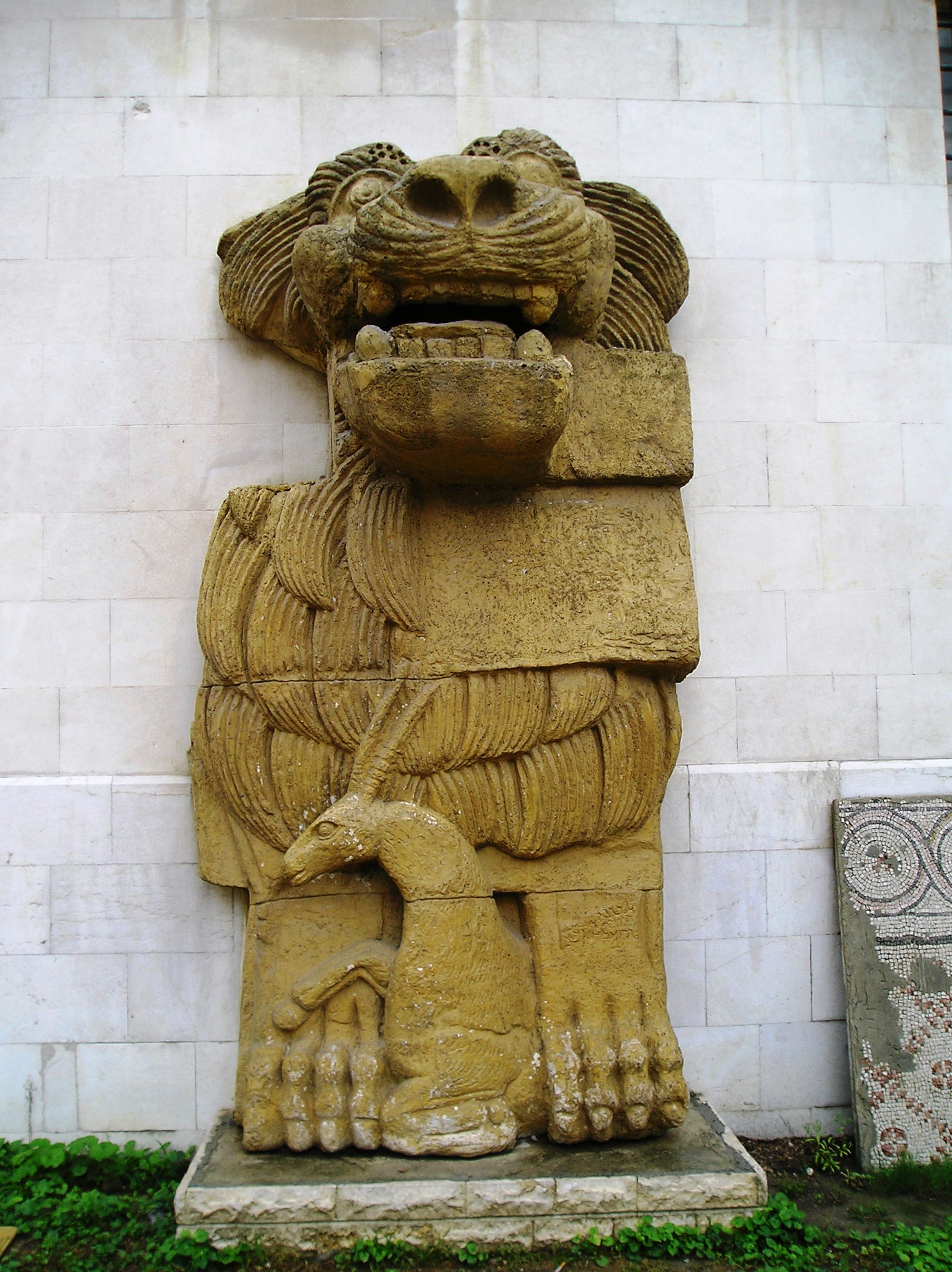
The statue before 2005 restoration

The statue was discovered in 1977 by a group of Polish archeologists from the Polish Centre of Mediterranean Archaeology of the University of Warsaw (PCMA UW) working under Prof. Michał Gawlikowski. The lion of Al-lāt was the basis for the PCMA UW logo design. The statue was found in pieces, having been reused in antiquity for the temple's foundation. Subsequently, it was decided to reassemble the pieces in front of the entrance to the Palmyra Museum. The task was undertaken by restorer Józef Gazy. In 2005, it underwent restoration to eliminate problems from assemblage. Ultimately, the piece was restored in imitation of its original intended appearance – a relief jumping out from a wall. During the Syrian Civil War the statue was shielded with a metal plate and sandbags to protect it from fighting.

On 27 June 2015, it was severely damaged by the Islamic State of Iraq and the Levant after the capture of Palmyra. After the liberation of Palmyra by the Syrian army, Syria's director-general of antiquities and museums Maamoun Abdulkarim declared that the pieces were still in place and it should be possible to reconstruct. The statue was moved to Damascus in 2016, where it underwent complete restoration. On 1 October 2017, it was fully restored, and is currently on display in the National Museum of Damascus, until safety is assured in Palmyra to move it there again.

== See also ==
- Destruction of cultural heritage by ISIL
