= Nabataean Arabic =

Language in classical antiquity

- Nabatean, Northern Arabian
- Region: Levant, Sinai Peninsula and northwestern Arabia
- Era: 4th century BCE to 1st century CE
- Language family: Afroasiatic: Semitic; West Semitic; Central Semitic; North Arabian?; Arabic; Old Arabic; Nabataean Arabic
- Writing system: Nabataean

Language codes
- ISO 639-3: None (mis)
- Linguist List: qhy-nor
- Glottolog: None

Nabataean Arabic was the dialect of Arabic spoken by the Nabataeans in antiquity.

In the first century CE, the Nabataeans wrote their inscriptions, such as the legal texts carved on the façades of the monumental tombs at Mada'in Salih, ancient Ḥegrā, in Nabataean Aramaic.

It is probable, however, that some or all of them, possibly in varying proportion depending on the region of the Nabataean Kingdom where they lived, spoke Arabic.

The term Nabataean Arabic may also refer to the script that succeeded Nabataean Aramaic and preceded Paleo-Arabic.

== Phonology ==
=== Consonants ===
Consonant phonemes of Nabataean Arabic
		Labial	Dental	Denti-alveolar		Palatal	Velar	Pharyngeal	Glottal
		Labial	Dental	plain	lateral	Palatal	Velar	Pharyngeal	Glottal
Nasal		[m] m ⟨م⟩		[n] n ⟨ن⟩					
Stop	voiceless	[pʰ] p ⟨ف⟩		[tʰ] t ⟨ت⟩			[kʰ] k ⟨ك⟩		[ʔ] ʾ ⟨ء⟩
Stop	voiced	[b] b ⟨ب⟩		[d] d ⟨د⟩			[g] g ⟨ج⟩		
Stop	emphatic			[tʼ] ṭ ⟨ط⟩			[kʼ] q ⟨ق⟩		
Fricative	voiceless		[θ] ṯ ⟨ث⟩	[s] s ⟨س⟩	[ɬ] s (Note: There is evidence that [tsʼ] had deaffricated and pharyngealized to [sˁ].) ⟨ش⟩		[x] ẖ ⟨خ⟩	[ħ] ḥ ⟨ح⟩	[h] h ⟨ه⟩
Fricative	voiced		[ð] ḏ ⟨ذ⟩	[z] z ⟨ز⟩			[ɣ] ġ ⟨غ⟩	[ʕ] ʿ ⟨ع⟩	
Fricative	emphatic		[ðˤ] ẓ (Note: These consonants were probably voiceless, in contrast with Old Hejazi, where they may have been voiced. It is clear that in southern Syria the two sounds had not merged and that they remained voiceless. The evidence from Nessana, on the other hand, suggests that both reflexes were voiced, and that they had possibly merged to [ɮˁ].) ⟨ظ⟩	[sˁ] ṣ ⟨ص⟩	[ɮˤ] ḍ ⟨ض⟩				
Rhotic				[r] r ⟨ر⟩					
Approximant					[l] l ⟨ل⟩	[j] y ⟨ي⟩	[w] w ⟨و⟩		

=== Vowels ===
Monophthong phonemes
	Short		Long	
	Front	Back	Front	Back
Close			iː	uː
Mid	e	o		
Open	a		æː	aː

In contrast with Old Hejazi and Classical Arabic, Nabataean Arabic may have undergone the shift [e] < *[i] and [o] < *[u], as evidenced by the numerous Greek transcriptions of Arabic from the area. This may have occurred in Safaitic as well, making it a possible Northern Old Arabic isogloss.

Nabataean א in دوسرا (dwsrʾ) does not signal [aː]; it would seem that *ay# collapsed to something like [æː]. Scribes must have felt that this sound was closer to א when the spelling conventions of Nabataean were fixed. In Greek transcription, this sound was felt to be closer to an e-class vowel, yielding Δουσαρης.

== Grammar ==
Proto-Arabic (unattested)
	Triptote	Diptote	Dual	Plural	
	Triptote	Diptote	Dual	Masculine	Feminine
Nominative	-un	-u	-āni	-ūna	-ātun
Accusative	-an	-a	-ayni	-īna	-ātin
Genitive	-in	-a	-ayni	-īna	-ātin

Proto-Arabic nouns could take one of the five above declensions in their basic, unbound form. The definite article spread areally among the Central Semitic languages and it would seem that Proto-Arabic lacked any overt marking of definiteness.

Pre-Nabataean Arabic (unattested)
	Triptote	Diptote	Dual	Plural	
	Triptote	Diptote	Dual	Masculine	Feminine
Nominative	-u	-∅	-ān	-ūn	-ātu
Accusative	-a	-∅	-ayn	-īn	-āti
Genitive	-i	-∅	-ayn	-īn	-āti

Final short vowels were lost, then nunation was lost, producing a new set of final short vowels. The definite article /ʾal-/ entered the language shortly after this stage.

Nabataean Arabic (ʿEn ʿAvdat, c. 125 CE)
	Triptote	Diptote	Dual	Plural	
	Triptote	Diptote	Dual	Masculine	Feminine
Nominative	(ʾal-)...-o	-∅	*(ʾal-)...-ān	*(ʾal-)...-ūn	*(ʾal-)...-āto?
Accusative	(ʾal-)...-a	-∅	*(ʾal-)...-ayn	*(ʾal-)...-īn	*(ʾal-)...-āte?
Genitive	(ʾal-)...-e	-∅	*(ʾal-)...-ayn	*(ʾal-)...-īn	*(ʾal-)...-āte?

The ʿEn ʿAvdat inscription shows that final [n] had been deleted in undetermined triptotes, and that the final short vowels of the determined state were intact. The reconstructed text of the inscription is as follows:

1. pa-yapʿal lā pedā wa lā ʾaṯara
2. pa-kon honā yabġe-nā ʾal-mawto lā ʾabġā-h
3. pa-kon honā ʾarād gorḥo lā yorde-nā

Translation: "And he acts neither for benefit nor favour and if death claims us let me not be claimed. And if an affliction occurs let it not afflict us".

Nabataean Arabic (JSNab 17, 267 CE)
	Triptote	Diptote	Dual	Plural	
	Triptote	Diptote	Dual	Masculine	Feminine
Nominative	(ʾal-)...-o	-∅	?	?	?
Accusative	(ʾal-)...-o	-∅	?	?	?
Genitive	(ʾal-)...-o	-∅	?	?	?

In JSNab 17, All Arabic triptotes terminate in w regardless of their syntactic position or whether they are defined.

== See also ==
- Proto-Arabic language
