= Bene Ma'zin =

Palmyrene tribe

The Bene Ma'zin were a Palmyrene tribe who were attested as one of the main four tribes of the city.

== Name and origin ==
The tribe's name is a plural that apparently referred to the founders' original occupation; it means the "goat herders". Ma'zin is an Arabic word; French archaeologist Javier Teixidor described the tribe as Arab, while Michał Gawlikowski, head of the Polish archaeological expedition in Palmyra between 1980-2011, stated that the tribe is best understood as an alliance of pastoralists from different origins who settled in the city.

== History ==
Membership in the tribe seems to have been composite and its name suggest a nomadic origin; the tribe included different clans such as the bene Yedi'bel whose member Mattanai founded the Allat temple in Palmyra. Beside the Allat, the tribe was responsible for the Temple of Baalshamin. The Ma'zin was one of four tribes in Palmyra that constituted its city council which governed the city.
