= Michael C. A. Macdonald =

British philologist (born 1947)

Michael C. A. Macdonald FBA is a research associate of the Khalili Research Centre, honorary fellow of Wolfson College, University of Oxford, and fellow of the British Academy. He is a Trustee of the International Association for the Study of Arabia. He is a specialist in the languages, scripts and inscriptions of ancient Syria, Jordan and Arabia. He was also the mentor of the epigraphist and linguist Ahmad Al-Jallad.

MacDonald is the leader of the OCIANA (Online Corpus of the Inscriptions of North Arabia). In 2015, the OCIANA project launched the Badia Epigraphic Survey (BES) project, directed by MacDonald along with Ali Al-Manaser. The goal of this project was to properly document all epigraphic inscriptions from the Jordanian Harrah. Over the course of six seasons of investigation, over 430,000 photos were taken and deposited into the OCIANA database.

== Selected publications ==
- A.F.L. Beeston at the Arabian Seminar, and other papers. Edited by M.C.A. Macdonald & C.S. Phillips, Oxford: Archaeopress. 2005.
- Literacy and Identity in Pre-Islamic Arabia. (Variorum Collected Studies, 906.) Farnham: Ashgate, 2009.
- The development of Arabic as a written language. Papers from the Special Session of the Seminar for Arabian Studies held on 24 July 2009. Edited by M.C.A. Macdonald. (Supplement to the Proceedings of the Seminar for Arabian Studies volume, 40). Oxford: Archaeopress, 2010.
- Crossing Sacred Landscapes: Contacts and Continuities in the Desert Cults and Beliefs of Ancient Northern Arabia and the Arid Southern Levant. Edited by J.M. Tebes & M.C.A. Macdonald. Bicester: Archaeopress, 2026.

== See also ==
- Laïla Nehmé
