= Alphasyllabic numeral system =

Alphasyllabic numeral systems are a type of numeral systems, developed mostly in India starting around 500 AD. Based on various alphasyllabic scripts, in this type of numeral systems glyphs of the numerals are not abstract signs, but syllables of a script, and numerals are represented with these syllable-signs. On the basic principle of these systems, numeric values of the syllables are defined by the consonants and vowels which constitute them, so that consonants and vowels are - or are not in some systems in case of vowels - ordered to numeric values. While there are many hundreds of possible syllables in a script, and since in alphasyllabic numeral systems several syllables receive the same numeric value, so the mapping is not injective.

== Alphasyllabaries ==
The basic principle of the Indian alphasyllabaries is a set of 33 consonant-signs, which are combined with a set of about 20 diacritic marks that indicate vowels of the brahmi scripts, these produce a set of signs for syllables; unmarked consonant-signs denote the syllable with the inherent vowel ’a’.

== Indian alphasyllabic numeration ==
Starting around 500 AD, Indian astronomers and astrologers began to use this new principle for numeration with assigning numeral values to the phonetic signs of various Indian alphasyllabic scripts – the brahmi scripts. Earlier 20th-century scholars supposed that the Indian grammarian Pāṇini used alphasyllabic numerals already in the 7th century BC. Since there is no direct evidence for any alphasyllabic numeration in India until about 510 AD, recently this theory is not supported.

These systems, known collectively as varnasankhya systems, were considered to be distinct from other Indian systems – i.e. brahmi or kharosthi numerals - that had abstract numeral-signs. Alike the alphabetic systems of Europe and the Middle East, these systems used phonetic signs of a script for numeration, but they were more flexible than those. Three significant systems of them: Āryabhaṭa numeration, katapayadi system, and the aksharapalli numerals.

Alphasyllabic numeration are very important for understanding Indian astronomy, astrology, and numerology, since Indian astronomical texts were written in Sanskrit verse, which had strict metrical form. These systems had the advantage of being able to give any word a numerical value, and to find many words corresponding to one given number. This made possible the construction of various mnemonics to aid scholars and students, and would have served a prosodic function.

== Structure ==
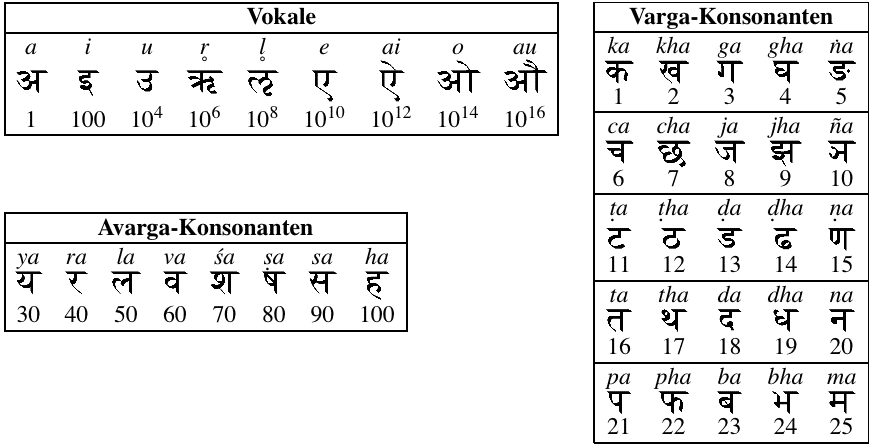
Āryabhaṭa numeration table (varga consonants, and avarga consonants are ordered to 1-25, and 30 -100; vowels to the powers of 100)

Structure of the Indian alphasyllabic numeration systems differs basically from one another. Though in each of the systems consonants and vowels are ordered to numeric values, thereby each syllable has a numeric value, but on the base of each system's own rules. In various systems the V, CV, CCV syllables receive different values, and the methods, how the numbers are represented by these syllables, are quite different.

- Āryabhaṭa numeration system operates on the additive principle, so that the number's value, which is represented in it, is computed as the sum of each syllable's numeric value. In his mapping, the consonants are ordered from 1 to 25, then by tens from 30 to 100. Each successive vowel is ordered to the different exponent of 100. In Āryabhaṭa numeration’s the diacritic signs, which mark vowels, multiply the value of the syllable’s consonant by the given power of 100. Direction of his script is right to left, which reflects the order of the Sanskrit lexical numerals.
- In katapayadi system, syllables have the numeric values only from 0 to 9. To each V, CV and CCV syllable is given a value between 0 and 9. In this way each number between 0 and 9 are ordered to several syllables. Unlike Aryabhata's system, changing the vowel in the syllable doesn’t change the syllable’s numerical value. The number’s value, which is represented in this way, is given as positional number with one syllable on each position. Direction of this script is right to left.

Numerals of the katapayadi system
1	2	3	4	5	6	7	8	9	0
ka क క ക	kha ख ఖ ഖ	ga ग గ ഗ	gha घ ఘ ഘ	nga ङ జ్ఞ ങ	ca च చ ച	cha छ ఛ ഛ	ja ज జ ജ	jha झ ఝ ഝ	nya ञ ఞ ഞ
ṭa ट ట ട	ṭha ठ ఠ ഠ	ḍa ड డ ഡ	ḍha ढ ఢ ഢ	ṇa ण ణ ണ	ta त త ത	tha थ థ ഥ	da द ద ദ	dha ध ధ ധ	na न న ന
pa प ప പ	pha फ ఫ ഫ	ba ब బ ബ	bha भ భ ഭ	ma म మ മ	-	-	-	-	-
ya य య യ	ra र ర ര	la ल ల ല	va व వ വ	śha श శ ശ	sha ष ష ഷ	sa स స സ	ha ह హ ഹ	-	-

- In aksharapalli system, syllables were assigned the numerical values 1–9, 10–90, but never as high as 1000. According to S. Chrisomalis there was never a single regular system for correlating signs with numeral values in this system. It was used widely for paginating books, aksharapalli numerals were written in the margins from top to bottom.

== Systems ==
- Āryabhaṭa numeration
- Katapayadi system
- Aksharapalli
- Tuubhyara

== Sources ==
- Stephen Chrisomalis (2010). Numerical Notation: A Comparati-ve History. Cambridge University Press. ISBN 9780521878180.
- Datta, Bibhutibhusan; Singh, Avadhesh Narayan (1962) [1935]. History of Hindu Mathematics. Bombay: Asia Publishing House.
- Georges Ifrah: The Universal History of Numbers. From Prehistory to the Invention of the Computer. John Wiley & Sons, New York, 2000, ISBN 0-471-39340-1.

== See also ==
- Alphabetic numeral system
- Bhutasamkhya system
