= Dhofari script =

Ancient South Semitic scripts

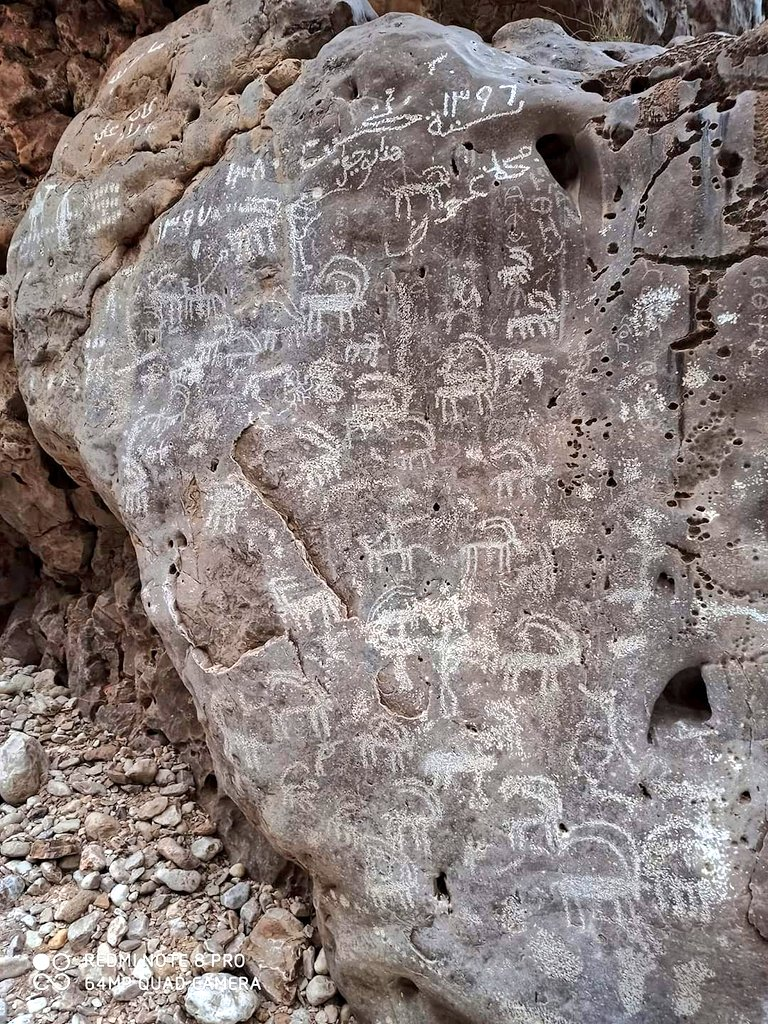
Dhofari script 1a inscriptions covered by later rock art of animals

The Dhofari script is a group of related pre-Islamic Arabian writing systems from the South Semitic linguistic family, used across southern and southeastern Arabia, from Dhofar in Oman to Al Mahrah in Yemen and as far as Socotra. Dhofari was usually painted in caves and rock shelters, but occasionally carved on wadi beds and movable stones.

The script was discovered by Western travelers at the end of the 19th century but remained undeciphered for the next century and more. The first comprehensive documentation and study of the inscriptions was carried out by Al-Shahri and King in 1991-1992. Although they were not able to decipher the scripts, they were able to sub-divide the collection of writings into two major categories, Scripts 1 and 2. In 2025, Ahmad Al-Jallad deciphered the scripts and outlined the values of the letter inventories of Script 1a and Script 2.

Dhofari represents a previously unknown branch of the South Semitic script family, derived from an Ancient North Arabian rather than South Arabian archetype, and records a now-extinct Semitic language related to the Modern South Arabian group (e.g. Mehri, Shehri). Script 1a and 2 are fully readable, although the phonemic values of some letter shapes in Script 1b remains unclear. The interpretation of many texts, especially those belonging to Script 2, remains challenging due to their brevity, the lack of comparative material, and the limited amount of text.

== Phonology ==
Both Script 1a and 2 have 26 different glyphs or characters, indicating that the historic interdental fricatives have merged with the sibilants: *ṯ > s³; *ḏ > z; *ṯ̣ > ṣ. The status of diphthongs is unclear as they are sometimes expressed and at other times not. Proto-Semitic *b(V)num 'son' is expressed as br, similar to the Modern South Arabian bər and Aramaic bar and contrasting with Ancient South Arabian bn and Arabic ibn.

== Grammar ==
Script 1a attests several unique grammatical features that distinguish it from Arabic and other South Arabian languages. This includes the preposition k- 'to, for' and the plural verbal inflectional ending -m. Script 2 attests productive mimation on personal names.

== Contents ==
While the Dhofari inscriptions exhibit some formulaic expressions, they are, generally speaking, composed in a much freer manner than most other Ancient North Arabian graffiti. Generally speaking, the texts record the names of individuals, short prayers, benedictions, and lamentations, themes in line with other types of Arabian graffiti. The interpretation of Script 1a texts is more secure than those of Script 2. The following are some sample texts.

Script 1a

KME 68-69: l ḥwdb br kws³r 'By Ḥwdb son of Kws³r'

KMH 44-47: nwmr s¹yhl ḥy ṭlt brḥ 'Nwmr, S¹yhl; long life the length of the journey'

KMA 8-11: l- rkb ʾb hl ʾhmm b- ḥwd -hy ḫ{l}ʾ s¹my{ʾ} 'For Rkb, patriarch of the clan are worries in their returning time and time again to {the empty place} of {S¹myʾ}'

KMD 18-20: ʾb s²m {ʾ}n s²m ʿqr w lt bn {s²}{m} kwr rm 'Father of S²m {I am} S²m ʿqr and Lt sons of S²m love Rm'

Script 2

DhSh 5: w s¹lm s¹lf l- bn ḥdy w s¹b ʾrn mrḍ 'And security has come to an end for the Banī Ḥdy as the goats were struck by illness'

KMHH 9: {r}{ḥ}km w nk hls¹m '{Rḥkm} and he had sex with Hls¹m'
