= Parahita =

Parahita is a system of astronomy prevalent in Kerala and Tamil Nadu, India. It was introduced by the Kerala astronomer Haridatta, (c. 683 AD). Nilakantha Somayaji (1444–1544), in his Dr̥kkaraṇa, relates how Parahita was created based on the combined observations of a group of scholars who had gathered for a festival at Tirunāvāy on the banks of the Bhāratappuzha River. The Sanskrit etymology literally means "for the benefit of the common man", and the intention was to simplify astronomical computations so that everyone could do it.

Parahita is a significant step in the simplification of the siddhantic tradition. Of the two texts of the system, Grahacāranibandhana and Mahāmārganibandhana, only the former is known. The system simplified the computational cycle of the Aryabhatiya by introducing a sub-aeon of 576 years and introduced a zero correction called Vāgbhāva based on which the system worked accurately around the time of Haridatta.

Also Haridatta simplified the representation of numerals from the cumbersome notation of Aryabhata to the katapayadi system which gained wide currency in later Kerala mathematics. In the katapayadi system, numerals may be represented by various letters so that the large numerical tables required for astronomical computations could be represented as verses and memorized.

The work Grahacāranibandhana-sangraha (932 AD) gives further details of the parahita technique. The methods were retained but some of the constants downgraded by Parameshvara in his DrggaNita (1483), and also by Achyuta Pisharati in his rAsigolasphuTanIti (1600).

== See also ==
- Drigganita
