= Ethiopic Extended-A =

- Range: U+AB00..U+AB2F (48 code points)
- Plane: BMP
- Scripts: Ethiopic
- Major alphabets: Gamo-Gofa-Dawro; Basketo; Gumuz
- Assigned: 32 code points
- Unused: 16 reserved code points

Unicode version history
- 6.0 (2010): 32 (+32)

Unicode documentation
- Code chart ∣ Web page

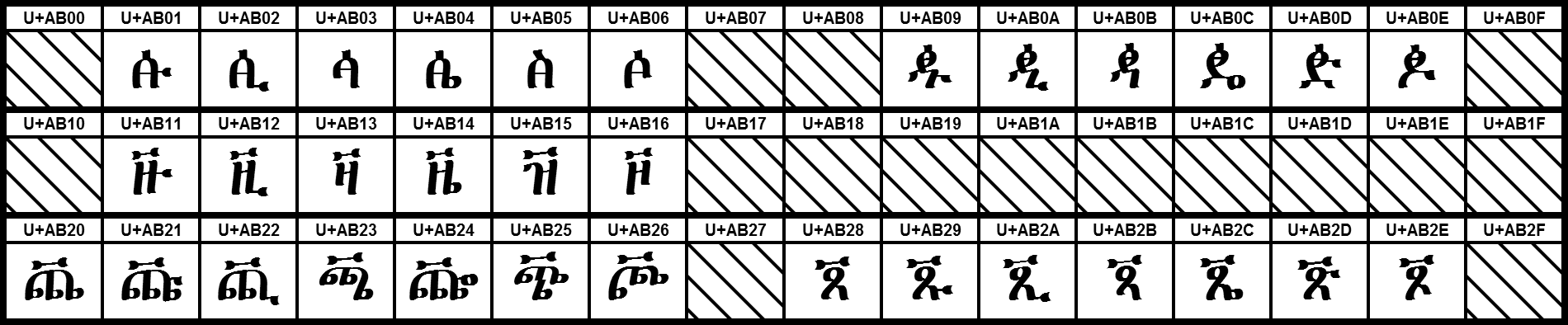
Graphical representation of the Ethiopic Extended-A Unicode block. Hatched boxes indicate non-assigned code points.

Ethiopic Extended-A is a Unicode block containing Geʽez characters for the Gamo-Gofa-Dawro, Basketo, and Gumuz languages of Ethiopia.

== Block ==
Ethiopic Extended-A^{[1]}^{[2]} Official Unicode Consortium code chart (PDF)
	0	1	2	3	4	5	6	7	8	9	A	B	C	D	E	F
U+AB0x		ꬁ	ꬂ	ꬃ	ꬄ	ꬅ	ꬆ			ꬉ	ꬊ	ꬋ	ꬌ	ꬍ	ꬎ	
U+AB1x		ꬑ	ꬒ	ꬓ	ꬔ	ꬕ	ꬖ									
U+AB2x	ꬠ	ꬡ	ꬢ	ꬣ	ꬤ	ꬥ	ꬦ		ꬨ	ꬩ	ꬪ	ꬫ	ꬬ	ꬭ	ꬮ	
Notes: 1. As of Unicode version 16.0; 2. Grey areas indicate non-assigned code points

== History ==
The following Unicode-related documents record the purpose and process of defining specific characters in the Ethiopic Extended-A block:

Version	Final code points (Note: Proposed code points and characters names may differ from final code points and names)	Count	L2 ID	WG2 ID	Document
6.0	U+AB01..AB06, AB09..AB0E, AB11..AB16, AB20..AB26, AB28..AB2E	32	L2/09-050R	N3572	Priest, Lorna (2009-02-05), Proposal to Encode Additional Ethiopic Characters
6.0	U+AB01..AB06, AB09..AB0E, AB11..AB16, AB20..AB26, AB28..AB2E	32	L2/09-003R		Moore, Lisa (2009-02-12), "B.15.16", UTC #118 / L2 #215 Minutes
6.0	U+AB01..AB06, AB09..AB0E, AB11..AB16, AB20..AB26, AB28..AB2E	32	L2/09-234	N3603 (pdf, doc)	Umamaheswaran, V. S. (2009-07-08), "M54.11", Unconfirmed minutes of WG 2 meeting 54
