= Ethiopic Supplement =

- Range: U+1380..U+139F (32 code points)
- Plane: BMP
- Scripts: Ethiopic
- Major alphabets: Sebatbeit
- Symbol sets: tonal marks
- Assigned: 26 code points
- Unused: 6 reserved code points

Unicode version history
- 4.1 (2005): 26 (+26)

Unicode documentation
- Code chart ∣ Web page

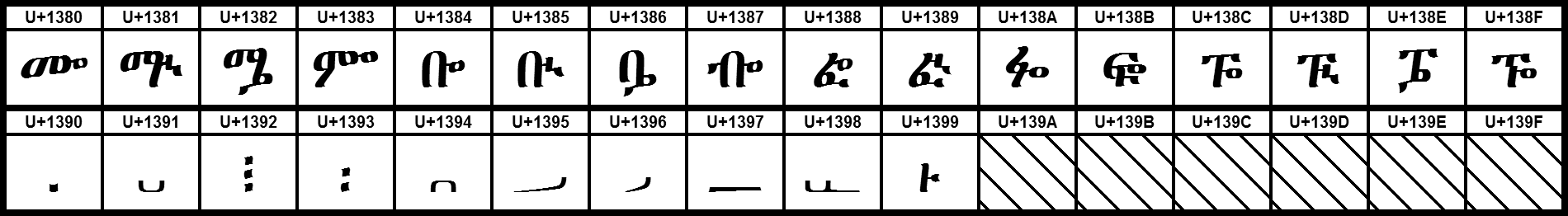
Graphical representation of the Ethiopic Supplement Unicode block

Ethiopic Supplement is a Unicode block containing extra Geʽez characters for writing the Sebat Bet Gurage language, and Ethiopic tone marks.

== Block ==
Ethiopic Supplement^{[1]}^{[2]} Official Unicode Consortium code chart (PDF)
	0	1	2	3	4	5	6	7	8	9	A	B	C	D	E	F
U+138x	ᎀ	ᎁ	ᎂ	ᎃ	ᎄ	ᎅ	ᎆ	ᎇ	ᎈ	ᎉ	ᎊ	ᎋ	ᎌ	ᎍ	ᎎ	ᎏ
U+139x	᎐	᎑	᎒	᎓	᎔	᎕	᎖	᎗	᎘	᎙						
Notes: 1. As of Unicode version 17.0; 2. Grey areas indicate non-assigned code points

== History ==
The following Unicode-related documents record the purpose and process of defining specific characters in the Ethiopic Supplement block:

Version	Final code points (Note: Proposed code points and characters names may differ from final code points and names)	Count	UTC ID	L2 ID	WG2 ID	Document
4.1	U+1380..1399	26	UTC/1991-026	X3L2/91-024		Anderson, Lloyd (1991-02-26), On the Extended Ethiopic Alphabet
4.1	U+1380..1399	26		L2/98-300	N1846	Everson, Michael; Yacob, Daniel (1998-09-11), Proposal to encode Ethiopic Extensions in the BMP of ISO/IEC 10646
4.1	U+1380..1399	26		L2/04-143	N2747	Yacob, Daniel (2004-04-23), Revision of the N1846 Proposal to add Extended Ethiopic to the BMP of the UCS
4.1	U+1380..1399	26		L2/04-265R	N2814R	Everson, Michael; Yacob, Daniel (2004-06-18), Revisions proposed to N2747 (Extended Ethiopic)
