= Karanapaddhati =

Book by Puthumana Somayaji

- Author: Puthumana Somayaji
- Language: Sanskrit
- Subject: Astronomy/Mathematics
- Publication date: 1733 CE (?)
- Publication place: India

Karanapaddhati is an astronomical treatise in Sanskrit attributed to Puthumana Somayaji, an astronomer-mathematician of the Kerala school of astronomy and mathematics. The period of composition of the work is uncertain. C.M. Whish, a civil servant of the East India Company, brought this work to the attention of European scholars for the first time in a paper published in 1834. The book is divided into ten chapters and is in the form of verses in Sanskrit. The sixth chapter contains series expansions for the value of the mathematical constant π, and expansions for the trigonometric sine, cosine and inverse tangent functions.

== Author and date of Karanapaddhati ==
Nothing definite is known about the author of Karanapaddhati. The last verse of the tenth chapter of Karanapaddhati describes the author as a Brahamin residing in a village named Sivapura. Sivapura is an area surrounding the present day Thrissur in Kerala, India.

The period in which Somayaji lived is also uncertain. There are several theories in this regard.

- C.M. Whish, the first westerner to write about Karanapaddhati, based on his interpretation that certain words appearing in the final verse of Karanapaddhati denote in katapayadi system the number of days in the Kali Yuga, concluded that the book was completed in 1733 CE. Whish had also claimed that the grandson of the author of the Karanapaddhati was alive and was in his seventieth year at the time of writing his paper.
- Based on reference to Puthumana Somayaji in a verse in Ganita Sucika Grantha by Govindabhatta, Raja Raja Varma placed the author of Karanapaddhati between 1375 and 1475 CE.
- An internal study of Karanapaddhati suggests that the work is contemporaneous with or even antedates the Tantrasangraha of Nilakantha Somayaji (1465–1545 CE).

== Synopsis of the book ==
A brief account of the contents of the various chapters of the book is presented below.

Chapter 1 : Rotation and revolutions of the planets in one mahayuga; the number of civil days in a mahayuga; the solar months, lunar months, intercalary months; kalpa and the four yugas and their durations, the details of Kali Yuga, calculation of the Kali era from the Malayalam Era, calculation of Kali days; the true and mean position of planets; simple methods for numerical calculations; computation of the true and mean positions of planets; the details of the orbits of planets; constants to be used for the calculation of various parameters of the different planets.

Chapter 2 : Parameters connected with Kali era, the positions of the planets, their angular motions, various parameters connected with Moon.

Chapter 3 : Mean center of Moon and various parameters of Moon based on its latitude and longitude, the constants connected with Moon.

Chapter 4 : Perigee and apogee of the Mars, corrections to be given at different occasions for the Mars, constants for Mars, Mercury, Jupiter, Venus, Saturn in the respective order, the perigee and apogee of all these planets, their conjunction, their conjunctions possibilities.

Chapter 5 : Division of the kalpa based on the revolution of the planets, the number of revolutions during the course of this kalpa, the number of civil and solar days of earth since the beginning of this kalpa, the number and other details of the manvantaras for this kalpa, further details on the four yugas.

Chapter 6 : Calculation of the circumference of a circle using variety of methods; the division of the circumference and diameters; calculation of various parameters of a circle and their relations; a circle, the arc, the chord, the arrow, the angles, their relations among a variety of parameters; methods to memorize all these factors using the katapayadi system.

Chapter 7 : Epicycles of the Moon and the Sun, the apogee and perigee of the planets; sign calculation based on the zodiacal sign in which the planets are present; the chord connected with rising, setting, the apogee and the perigee; the method for determining the end-time of a month; the chords of the epicycles and apogee for all the planets, their hypotenuse.

Chapter 8 : Methods for the determination of the latitude and longitude for various places on the earth; the R-sine and R-cosine of the latitude and longitude, their arc, chord and variety of constants.

Chapter 9 : Details of the Alpha aeries sign; calculation of the positions of the planets in correct angular values; calculation of the position of the stars, the parallax connected with latitude and longitude for various planets, Sun, Moon and others stars.

Chapter 10 : Shadows of the planets and calculation of various parameters connected with the shadows; calculation of the precision of the planetary positions.

== Infinite series expressions ==
The sixth chapter of Karanapaddhati is mathematically very interesting. It contains infinite series expressions for the constant π and infinite series expansions for the trigonometric functions. These series also appear in Tantrasangraha and their proofs are found in Yuktibhāṣā.

=== Series expressions for π ===
Series 1

The first series is specified in the verse

vyāsāccaturghnād bahuśaḥ pr̥thaksthāt tripañcasaptādyayugāhr̥ tāni
vyāse caturghne kramaśastvr̥ṇam svaṁ kurjāt tadā syāt paridhiḥ susuksmaḥ

which translates into the formula

π/4 = 1 - 1/3 + 1/5 - 1/7 + ...

Series 2

A second series is specified in the verse

vyāsād vanasamguṇitāt pr̥thagāptaṁ tryādyayug-vimulaghanaiḥ
triguṇavyāse svamr̥naṁ kramasah kr̥tvāpi paridhirāneyaḥ

and this can be put in the form

π = 3 + 4 { 1 / ( 3^{3} - 3 ) + 1 / ( 5^{3} - 5 ) + 1 / ( 7^{3} - 7 ) + ... }

Series 3

A third series for π is contained in

vargairyujāṃ vā dviguṇairnirekairvargīkṛtair-varjitayugmavargaiḥ
vyāsaṃ ca ṣaḍghanaṃ vibhajet phalaṃ svaṃ vyāse trinīghne paridhistadā syāt

which is

π = 3 + 6 { 1 / ( (2 × 2^{2} - 1 )^{2} - 2^{2} ) + 1 / ( (2 × 4^{2} - 1 )^{2} - 4^{2} ) + 1 / ( (2 × 6^{2} - 1 )^{2} - 6^{2} ) + ... }

=== Series expansions of trigonometric functions ===
The following verse describes the infinite series expansions of the sine and cosine functions.

cāpācca tattat phalato'pi tadvat cāpāhatāddvayādihatat trimaurvyā
labdhāni yugmāni phalānyadhodhaḥ cāpādayugmāni ca vistarārdhāt
vinyasya coparyupari tyajet tat śeṣau bhūjākoṭiguṇau bhavetāṃ

These expressions are

sin x = x - x^{3} / 3! + x^{5} / 5! - ...
cos x = 1 - x^{2} / 2! + x^{4} / 4! - ...

Finally the following verse gives the expansion for the inverse tangent function.

vyāsārdhena hatādabhiṣṭaguṇataḥ koṭyāptamaādyaṃ phalaṃ
jyāvargeṇa vinighnamādimaphalaṃ tattatphalaṃ cāharet
kṛtyā koṭiguṇāsya tatra tu phaleṣvekatripañcādibhir-
bhakteṣvojayutaistajet samajutiṃ jīvādhanuśiśaṣate

The specified expansion is

tan^{−1} x = x - x^{3} / 3 + x^{5} / 5 - ...

== Further references ==
- Open Library reference to Karana-paddhati with two commentaries.
- Bag, Amulya Kumar (1976). "Madhava's sine and cosine series" (PDF). Indian Journal of History of Science. 11 (1). Indian National Academy of Science: 54–57. Archived from the original (PDF) on 14 February 2010.
- Bag, Amulya Kumar (1975). "The method of integral solutions of indeterminate equations of the type BY=AX ± C in ancient and medieval India" (PDF). Indian Journal of History of Science. 12 (1). Indian National Academy of Science: 1–16.
- P.K. Koru, ed. (1953). Karanapaddhati of Puthumana Somayaji. Cherpu, Kerala, India: Astro Printing and Publishing Company.
- Indian National Science Academy has started a project in 2007–08 titled "A Critical Study of Karana-paddhati of Putumana Somayaji and Preparation of English Translation with Mathematical Notes" by Dr. K Ramasubramanian, Assistant Professor, Dept. of History, Indian Institute of Technology, Powai, Mumbai 400076. (Retrieved on 13 January 2010)
