= Āryabhaṭa numeration =

Alpha-syllabic numeral system

Āryabhaṭa numeration is an alphasyllabic numeral system based on Sanskrit phonemes. It was introduced in the early 6th century in India by Āryabhaṭa, in the first chapter titled Gītika Padam of his Aryabhatiya. It attributes a numerical value to each syllable of the form consonant+vowel possible in Sanskrit phonology, from ka = 1 up to hau = 10^{18}.

== History ==
The basis of this number system is mentioned in the second stanza of the first chapter of Aryabhatiya.

The Varga (Group/Class) letters ka to ma are to be placed in the varga (square) places (1st, 100th, 10000th, etc.) and Avarga letters like ya, ra, la .. have to be placed in Avarga places (10th, 1000th, 100000th, etc.).

The Varga letters ka to ma have values from 1, 2, 3 .. up to 25 and Avarga letters ya to ha have values 30, 40, 50 .. up to 100. In the Varga and Avarga letters, beyond the ninth vowel (place), new symbols can be used.

The values for vowels are as follows: a = 1; i = 100; u = 10000; ṛ = 1000000 and so on.

Aryabhata used this number system for representing both small and large numbers in his mathematical and astronomical calculations.

This system can even be used to represent fractions and mixed fractions. For example, nga is 1/5, nja is 1/10 and jhardam (jha=9; its half) = 4 1/2.

== Example ==
Example: 299,792,458
10^{0} 10^{1}	10^{2} 10^{3}	10^{4} 10^{5}	10^{6} 10^{7}	10^{8}
85,	42,	97,	99,	2
जल	घिनि	झुशु	झृसृ	खॢ
ja-la	ghi-ni	jhu-śu	jhṛ-sṛ	khḷ

The traditional Indian digit order is reversed compared to the modern way. By consequence, Āryabhaṭa began with the ones before the tens; then the hundreds and the thousands; then the myriad and the lakh (10^{5}) and so on. (cf. Indian numbering system)

Another example might be ङिशिबुणॢष्खृ ṅiśibuṇḷṣkhṛ, 1582237500. Note that in this case, 10^{6}(ṛ) and 10^{8}(ḷ) parts are swapped, and 10^{6}(ṛ) part is ligature.

Another example from Aryabhatiya is a verse for table of sines.

makhi bhakhi phakhi dhakhi ṇakhi ñakhi
ṅakhi hasjha skaki kiṣga śghakhi kighva
ghlaki kigra hakya dhaki kica sga jhaśa
ṅva kla pta pha cha kala-ardha-jyāḥ

== Numeral table ==
In citing the values of Āryabhaṭa numbers, the short vowels अ, इ, उ, ऋ, ऌ, ए, and ओ are invariably used. However, the Āryabhaṭa system did not distinguish between long and short vowels. This table only cites the full slate of क-derived (1 × 10^{x}) values, but these are valid throughout the list of numeric syllables.

The 33 × 9 = 297 Sanskrit alphabetic numerical syllables
Nine vowels or syllabics			-a	-i	-u	-ṛ	-ḷ	-e	-ai	-o	-au
			अ	इ	उ	ऋ	ऌ	ए	ऐ	ओ	औ
		×	10^{0}	10^{2}	10^{4}	10^{6}	10^{8}	10^{10}	10^{12}	10^{14}	10^{16}
Five velar plosives
k -	क	1	क or का ka	कि or की ki	कु or कू ku	कृ or कॄ kṛ	कॢ or कॣ kḷ	के or कॆ ke	कै kai	को or कॊ ko	कौ kau
kh -	ख	2	ख kha	खि khi	खु khu	खृ khṛ	खॢ khḷ	खे khe	खै khai	खो kho	खौ khau
g -	ग	3	ग ga	गि gi	गु gu	गृ gṛ	गॢ gḷ	गे ge	गै gai	गो go	गौ gau
gh -	घ	4	घ gha	घि ghi	घु ghu	घृ ghṛ	घॢ ghḷ	घे ghe	घै ghai	घो gho	घौ ghau
ṅ -	ङ	5	ङ ṅa	ङि ṅi	ङु ṅu	ङृ ṅṛ	ङॢ ṅḷ	ङे ṅe	ङै ṅai	ङो ṅo	ङौ ṅau
Five palatal plosives
c -	च	6	च ca	चि ci	चु cu	चृ cṛ	चॢ cḷ	चे ce	चै cai	चो co	चौ cau
ch -	छ	7	छि chi	छु chu	छृ chṛ	छॢ chḷ	छे che	छै chai	छो cho	छौ chau
j -	ज	8	ज ja	जि ji	जु ju	जृ jṛ	जॢ jḷ	जे je	जै jai	जो jo	जौ jau
jh -	झ	9	झ jha	झि jhi	झु jhu	झृ jhṛ	झॢ jhḷ	झे jhe	झै jhai	झो jho	झौ jhau
ñ -	ञ	10	ञ ña	ञि ñi	ञु ñu	ञृ ñṛ	ञॢ ñḷ	ञे ñe	ञै ñai	ञो ño	ञौ ñau
Five retroflex plosives
ṭ -	ट	11	ट ṭa	टि ṭi	टु ṭu	टृ ṭṛ	टॢ ṭḷ	टे ṭe	टै ṭai	टो ṭo	टौ ṭau
ṭh -	ठ	12	ठ ṭha	ठि ṭhi	ठु ṭhu	ठृ ṭhṛ	ठॢ ṭhḷ	ठे ṭhe	ठै ṭhai	ठो ṭho	ठौ ṭhau
ḍ -	ड	13	ड ḍa	डि ḍi	डु ḍu	डृ ḍṛ	डॢ ḍḷ	डे ḍe	डै ḍai	डो ḍo	डौ ḍau
ḍh -	ढ	14	ढ ḍha	ढि ḍhi	ढु ḍhu	ढृ ḍhṛ	ढॢ ḍhḷ	ढे ḍhe	ढै ḍhai	ढो ḍho	ढौ ḍhau
ṇ -	ण	15	ण ṇa	णि ṇi	णु ṇu	णृ ṇṛ	णॢ ṇḷ	णे ṇe	णै ṇai	णो ṇo	णौ ṇau
Five dental plosives
t -	त	16	त ta	ति ti	तु tu	तृ tṛ	तॢ tḷ	ते te	तै tai	तो to	तौ tau
th -	थ	17	थ tha	थि thi	थु thu	थृ thṛ	थॢ thḷ	थे the	थै thai	थो tho	थौ thau
d -	द	18	द da	दि di	दु du	दृ dṛ	दॢ dḷ	दे de	दै dai	दो do	दौ dau
dh -	ध	19	ध dha	धि dhi	धु dhu	धृ dhṛ	धॢ dhḷ	धे dhe	धै dhai	धो dho	धौ dhau
n -	न	20	न na	नि ni	नु nu	नृ nṛ	नॢ nḷ	ने ne	नै nai	नो no	नौ nau
Five labial plosives
p -	प	21	प pa	पि pi	पु pu	पृ pṛ	पॢ pḷ	पे pe	पै pai	पो po	पौ pau
ph -	फ	22	फ pha	फि phi	फु phu	फृ phṛ	फॢ phḷ	फे phe	फै phai	फो pho	फौ phau
b -	ब	23	ब ba	बि bi	बु bu	बृ bṛ	बॢ bḷ	बे be	बै bai	बो bo	बौ bau
bh -	भ	24	भ bha	भि bhi	भु bhu	भृ bhṛ	भॢ bhḷ	भे bhe	भै bhai	भो bho	भौ bhau
m -	म	25	म ma	मि mi	मु mu	मृ mṛ	मॢ mḷ	मे me	मै mai	मो mo	मौ mau
Four approximants or trill
y -	य	30	य ya	यि yi	यु yu	यृ yṛ	यॢ yḷ	ये ye	यै yai	यो yo	यौ yau
r -	र	40	र ra	रि ri	रु ru	रृ rṛ	रॢ rḷ	रे re	रै rai	रो ro	रौ rau
l -	ल	50	ल la	लि li	लु lu	लृ lṛ	लॢ lḷ	ले le	लै lai	लो lo	लौ lau
v -	व	60	व va	वि vi	वु vu	वृ vṛ	वॢ vḷ	वे ve	वै vai	वो vo	वौ vau
Three coronal fricatives
ś -	श	70	श śa	शि śi	शु śu	शृ śṛ	शॢ śḷ	शे śe	शै śai	शो śo	शौ śau
ṣ -	ष	80	ष ṣa	षि ṣi	षु ṣu	षृ ṣṛ	षॢ ṣḷ	षे ṣe	षै ṣai	षो ṣo	षौ ṣau
s -	स	90	स sa	सि si	सु su	सृ sṛ	सॢ sḷ	से se	सै sai	सो so	सौ sau
One glottal fricative
h -	ह	100	ह ha	हि hi	हु hu	हृ hṛ	हॢ hḷ	हे he	है hai	हो ho	हौ hau

== See also ==
- Aksharapalli
- Bhutasamkhya system
- Katapayadi system
- IAST
