= Ethiopic Extended =

- Range: U+2D80..U+2DDF (96 code points)
- Plane: BMP
- Scripts: Ethiopic
- Major alphabets: Me'en; Blin; Sebatbeit
- Assigned: 79 code points
- Unused: 17 reserved code points

Unicode version history
- 4.1 (2005): 79 (+79)

Unicode documentation
- Code chart ∣ Web page

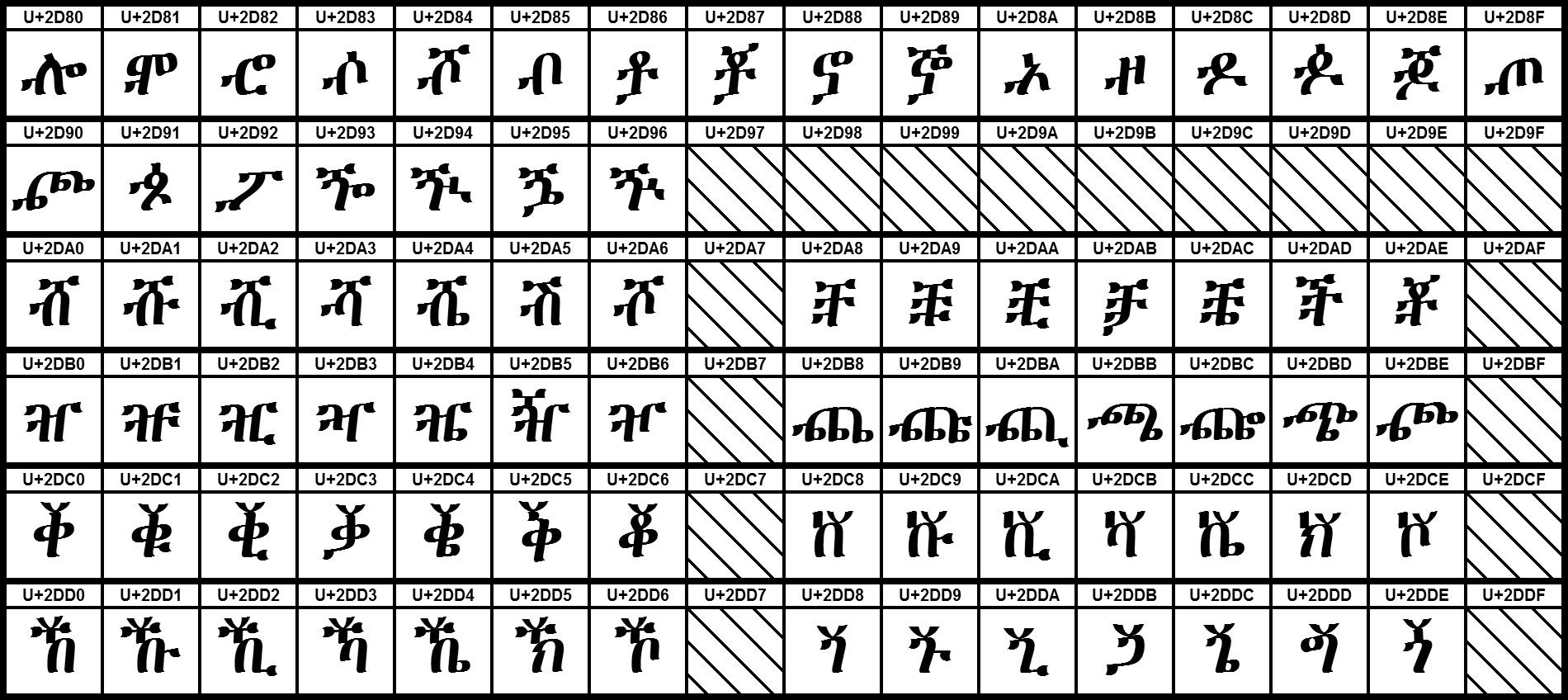
Graphical representation of the Ethiopic Extended Unicode block

Ethiopic Extended is a Unicode block containing Geʽez characters for the Me'en, Blin, and Sebat Bet Gurage languages.

== Block ==
Ethiopic Extended^{[1]}^{[2]} Official Unicode Consortium code chart (PDF)
	0	1	2	3	4	5	6	7	8	9	A	B	C	D	E	F
U+2D8x	ⶀ	ⶁ	ⶂ	ⶃ	ⶄ	ⶅ	ⶆ	ⶇ	ⶈ	ⶉ	ⶊ	ⶋ	ⶌ	ⶍ	ⶎ	ⶏ
U+2D9x	ⶐ	ⶑ	ⶒ	ⶓ	ⶔ	ⶕ	ⶖ									
U+2DAx	ⶠ	ⶡ	ⶢ	ⶣ	ⶤ	ⶥ	ⶦ		ⶨ	ⶩ	ⶪ	ⶫ	ⶬ	ⶭ	ⶮ	
U+2DBx	ⶰ	ⶱ	ⶲ	ⶳ	ⶴ	ⶵ	ⶶ		ⶸ	ⶹ	ⶺ	ⶻ	ⶼ	ⶽ	ⶾ	
U+2DCx	ⷀ	ⷁ	ⷂ	ⷃ	ⷄ	ⷅ	ⷆ		ⷈ	ⷉ	ⷊ	ⷋ	ⷌ	ⷍ	ⷎ	
U+2DDx	ⷐ	ⷑ	ⷒ	ⷓ	ⷔ	ⷕ	ⷖ		ⷘ	ⷙ	ⷚ	ⷛ	ⷜ	ⷝ	ⷞ	
Notes: 1. As of Unicode version 16.0; 2. Grey areas indicate non-assigned code points

== History ==
The following Unicode-related documents record the purpose and process of defining specific characters in the Ethiopic Extended block:

Version	Final code points (Note: Proposed code points and characters names may differ from final code points and names)	Count	UTC ID	L2 ID	WG2 ID	Document
4.1	U+2D80..2D96, 2DA0..2DA6, 2DA8..2DAE, 2DB0..2DB6, 2DB8..2DBE, 2DC0..2DC6, 2DC8..2DCE, 2DD0..2DD6, 2DD8..2DDE	79	UTC/1991-026	X3L2/91-024		Anderson, Lloyd (1991-02-26), On the Extended Ethiopic Alphabet
4.1	U+2D80..2D96, 2DA0..2DA6, 2DA8..2DAE, 2DB0..2DB6, 2DB8..2DBE, 2DC0..2DC6, 2DC8..2DCE, 2DD0..2DD6, 2DD8..2DDE	79		L2/98-300	N1846	Everson, Michael; Yacob, Daniel (1998-09-11), Proposal to encode Ethiopic Extensions in the BMP of ISO/IEC 10646
4.1	U+2D80..2D96, 2DA0..2DA6, 2DA8..2DAE, 2DB0..2DB6, 2DB8..2DBE, 2DC0..2DC6, 2DC8..2DCE, 2DD0..2DD6, 2DD8..2DDE	79		L2/04-143	N2747	Yacob, Daniel (2004-04-23), Revision of the N1846 Proposal to add Extended Ethiopic to the BMP of the UCS
4.1	U+2D80..2D96, 2DA0..2DA6, 2DA8..2DAE, 2DB0..2DB6, 2DB8..2DBE, 2DC0..2DC6, 2DC8..2DCE, 2DD0..2DD6, 2DD8..2DDE	79		L2/04-265R	N2814R	Everson, Michael; Yacob, Daniel (2004-06-18), Revisions proposed to N2747 (Extended Ethiopic)
