= Bhutasamkhya system =

Method of recording numbers using words

The Bhūtasaṃkhyā system is a method of recording numbers in Sanskrit using common nouns having connotations of numerical values. The method was introduced already in astronomical texts in antiquity, but it was expanded and developed during the medieval period. A kind of rebus system, bhūtasaṃkhyā has also been called the "concrete number notation".

For example, the number "two" was associated with the word "eye" as every human being has two eyes. Thus every Sanskrit word having the meaning "eye" was used to denote "two". All words synonymous with the meaning "earth" could be used to signify the number "one" as there is only one earth, etc.

In the more expansive examples of application, concepts, ideas and objects from all parts of the Sanskrit lexicon were harvested to generate number-connoting words, resulting in a kind of kenning system for numbers. Thus, every Sanskrit word indicating an "arrow" has been used to denote "five" as Kamadeva, the Hindu deity of love, is traditionally depicted as a warrior carrying five arrows of flowers. The term anuṣṭubh has been used to signify "eight" as it is the name of a meter with eight syllables in a foot. Any Sanskrit word for "tooth" could be used to denote 32 as a grown-up man has a full set of 32 teeth. Terms implying "the gods" were used to indicate 33, as there is a tradition of "thirty-three gods" (trāyastriṃśadeva) in certain Hindu and Buddhist texts. A potential user of the system had a multitude of words to choose from for denoting the same number. The mapping from "words" to "numbers" is many-to-one. This has facilitated the embedding of numbers in verses in Indian treatises on mathematics and astronomy. This helped in memorising large tables of numbers required by astronomers and astrologers.

Single words indicating smaller numbers were strung together to form phrases and sentences for representing arbitrary large numbers. This formation of large numbers was accomplished by incorporating the decimal place value system into the scheme, where digits are named in ascending order. As an example, in an 18th-century inscription from Kalna, a year is given as bāṇa-vyoma-dharādhar-indu-gaṇite śāke which means "In the Śāka year enumerated by arrow [5], sky [0], mountain [7] and moon [1]", that is, "Śāka 5-0-7-1" = Śāka 1705 = AD 1783.

The earliest evidence of this system is found in Yavanajataka, a versification of a Greek astronomical text dated to the early centuries CE. Limited use of Bhutasamkhya is seen in some Puranas, for example Bhagavata Mahatmya of Padma Purana (6.66) uses the word 'nagaaha to refer to "seven days", i.e. naga "mountain" is used as a synonym of "seven" (because of the "seven principal mountains" or kula-giri), a usage already found in medieval recensions of the Surya Siddhanta. It is found throughout the Indian Buddhist Kalacakra Tantra literature.

== See also ==
- Aksharapalli
- Āryabhaṭa numeration
- Katapayadi system
