= South Semitic scripts =

Family of writing systems that split from the Proto-Sinaitic script

- Script type: Abjad
- Period: c. 10th century BCE to 6th century AD
- Direction: Right-to-left
- Languages: Old South Arabian, Ge'ez, Dadanitic, Taymanitic, Dumaitic, Thamudic, Safaitic, Hismaic

Related scripts
- Parent systems: Egyptian hieroglyphs: Proto-Sinaitic script; South Semitic scripts
- Child systems: Ancient North Arabian; Ancient South Arabian; Ge'ez
- Sister systems: Phoenician

The South Semitic scripts are a cluster of alphabets that had derived from the Proto-Sinaitic script by the 10th century BC. The family has two main branches: Ancient North Arabian (ANA) and Ancient South Arabian (ASA).

The scripts were exclusive to the Arabian Peninsula and the Horn of Africa. All the ANA and most of the ASA scripts fell out of use by the 6th century AD.

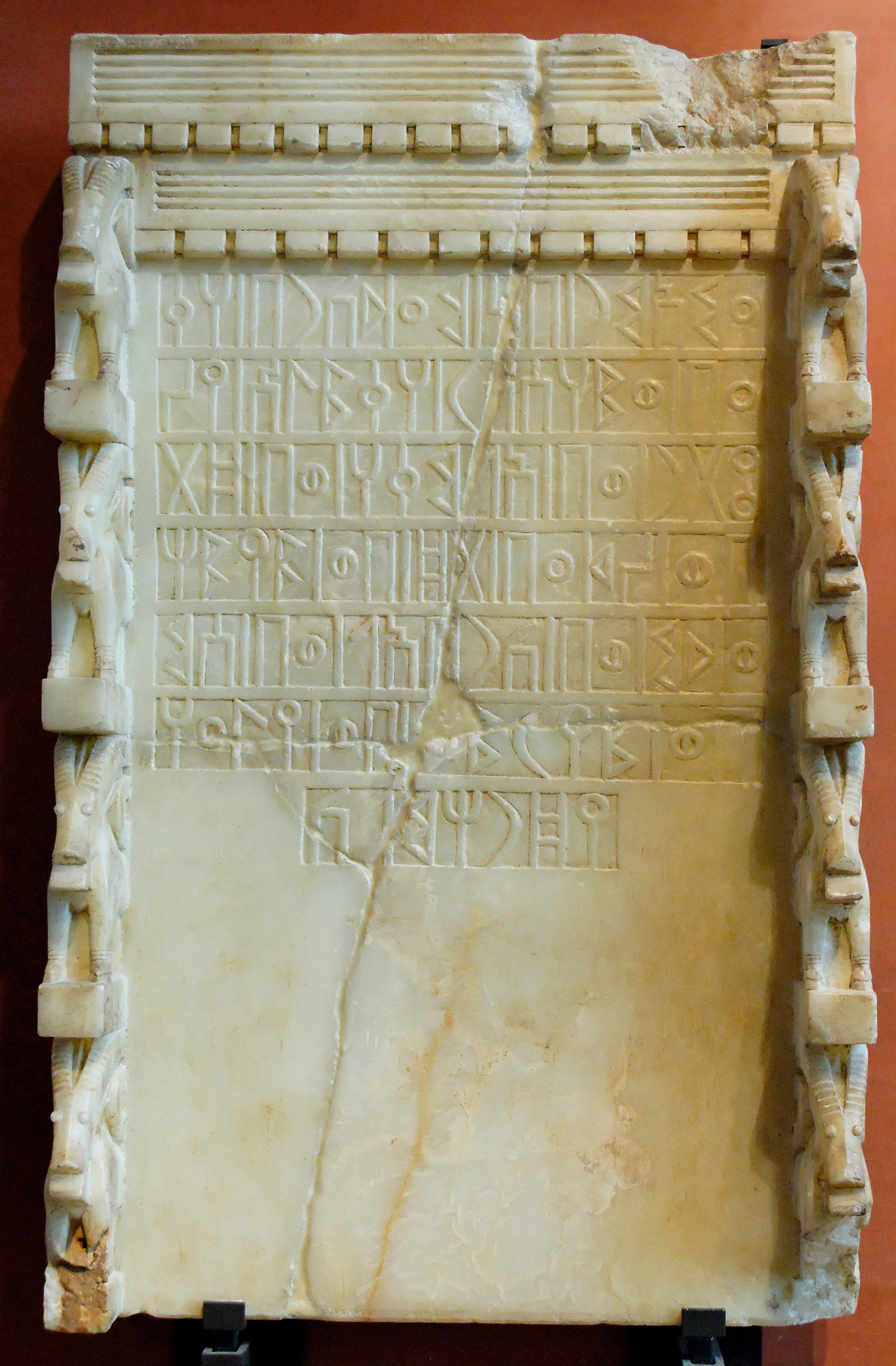
South Arabian inscription addressed to the Sabaean national god Almaqah

The exception was Geʽez, a child of ASA in use in Ethiopia. It and its variants remain in use today for various Ethiosemitic languages. In Arabia, the South Semitic scripts were replaced by the Arabic script, which is descended from the Nabataean script.
