= Aksharapalli =

Alphasyllabic numeration scheme used in ancient Indian manuscripts

Aksharapalli (Akṣarapallī) is a certain type of alphasyllabic numeration scheme extensively used in the pagination of manuscripts produced in India in pre-modern times. The name Aksharapalli can be translated as the letter system. In this system the letters or the syllables of the script in which the manuscript is written are used to denote the numbers. In contrast to the Aksharapalli system, the ordinary decimal system is called the Ankapalli system.

== Examples of syllables used to represent numerals ==
The following tables give examples of syllables used to represent numerals. The lists are not exhaustive.

Numeral	Transliterations	Devanagari
1	e, sva, rūṁ	ए, स्व, रूं
2	dvi, sti, na	द्वि, स्ति, न
3	tri, śrī, maḥ	त्रि, श्री, मह्
4	ṅka, rṅka, ṅkā, ṇka, rṇka, ṣka, rṣka	ङ्क, र्ङ्‍क, ङ्का, ण्क, र्ण्क, ष्क, र्ष्क
5	tṛ. rtṛ, rtṛā, hṛ, nṛ, rnṛ	तृ, र्तृ, र्तृ, हृ, नृ, र्नृ
6	phra, rphra, rphru, ghna, bhra, rpu, vyā, phla	फ्र, र्फ्र, र्फ्रु, घ्न, भ्र, र्पु, व्या, फ्ल
7	gra, grā, rgrā, rgbhrā, rggā, bhra	ग्र, ग्रा, र्ग्रा, र्ग्‍भ्रा, र्ग्‍गा, भ्र
8	hra, rhra, rhrā, dra	ह्र, र्ह्र, र्ह्रा, द्र
9	oṁ, ruṁ, ru, uṁ, a, rnuṁ	ॐ, रुं, रु, उं, अ, र्नुं
10	ḷa, ṇṭa, ḍa, a, rpta	ळ, ण्त, ड, र्प्त

There are symbols for 20, 30, . . . 100 and then for 200,
300, 400.But there no symbols for higher numerals possibly
because there was no need for such numerals as the
system was used primarily for pagination.

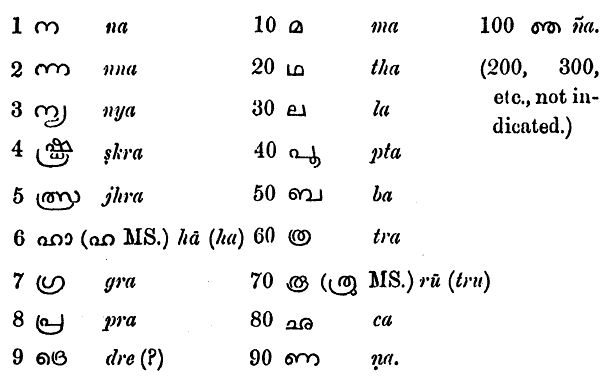
Aksharapalli numerals in Malayalam as given in "Grammar of the Malayalam Language" by Hermann Gundert published in 1868 and reproduced in The Journal of the Royal Asiatic Society of Great Britain and Ireland in 1896.

== Usage ==
When the Aksharapalli system is used, the various syllables that constitute a number are placed one below the other as in the Chinese language and they are written in the margins of the various leaves of the manuscript. This arrangement may be the consequence an attempt to save space for the contents of the manuscript. This method can be seen in the earliest available manuscript containing the Aksharapalli system which is a manuscript of sixth century CE.

== History ==
Nothing definitely is known about the origin of the system. It is conjectured that the system might have evolved from the ciphered-additive numeral system of Brahmi. This system has been extensively used in Jain manuscripts up to the sixteenth century. The system has also survived for a long time in Nepal. The system was in use as late as the nineteenth century in those regions of India which now constitute the Kerala State.
