= Palmyra =

Ancient city in central Syria

- 𐡶𐡣𐡬𐡥𐡴; تَدْمُر
- Tadmor
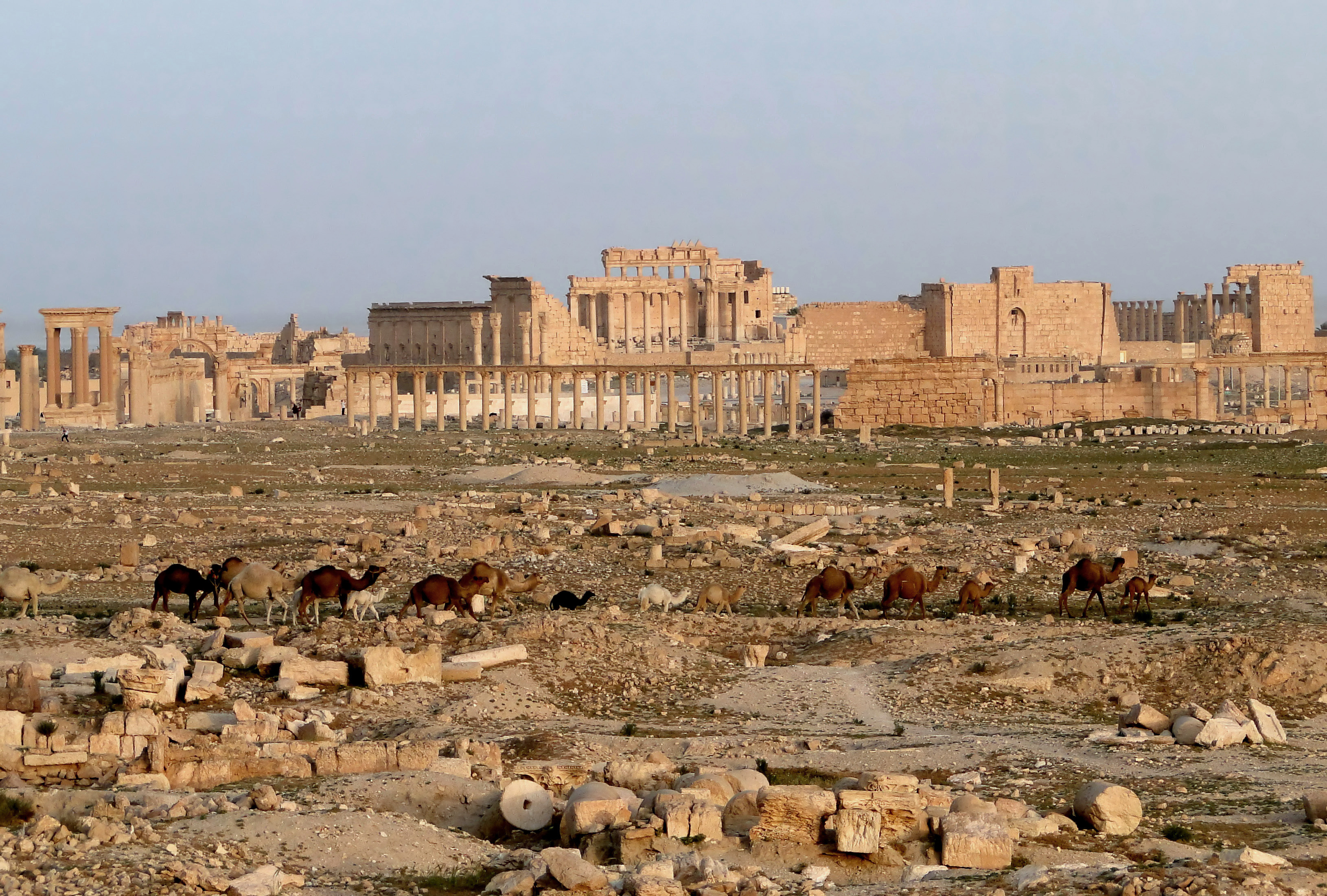
- The ruins of Palmyra in 2010

- Location within Syria Location within Eastern Mediterranean Location within West and Central Asia
- 34°33′05″N 38°16′05″E
- Type: Settlement
- Periods: Middle Bronze Age to Modern
- Cultures: Aramaic, Arabic, Greco-Roman
- Location: Tadmur, Homs Governorate, Syria
- Region: Syrian Desert
- Part of: Palmyrene Empire

History
- Built: 3rd millennium BC
- Abandoned: 1932

Site notes
- Area: 80 ha (200 acres)
- Condition: Ruined
- Owner: Public
- Management: Syrian Ministry of Culture
- Public access: Yes

UNESCO World Heritage Site
- Official name: Site of Palmyra
- Type: Cultural
- Criteria: i, ii, iv
- Designated: 1980 (4th Session)
- Reference no.: 23
- Region: Arab states
- Endangered: 2013–present

Palmyra (Note: /pæl.ˈmaɪ.rə/, pal-MY-rə; Palmyrene Aramaic: 𐡶𐡣𐡬𐡥𐡴, romanized: Tadmor; Arabic: تَدْمُر, romanized: Tadmur) is an ancient city in central Syria. Located in the eastern part of the Levant, archaeological finds around the site date back to the Neolithic period, and documents first mention the city in the early second millennium BC. Palmyra changed hands on a number of occasions between different empires before becoming a subject of the Roman Empire in the first century AD.

The city grew wealthy from trade caravans; the Palmyrenes became renowned as merchants who established colonies along the Silk Road and operated throughout the Roman Empire. Palmyra's wealth enabled the construction of monumental projects, such as the Great Colonnade, the Temple of Bel, and the distinctive tower tombs. Ethnically, the Palmyrenes combined elements of Amorites, Arameans, and Arabs. Socially structured around kinship and clans, Palmyra's inhabitants spoke Palmyrene Aramaic, a variety of Western Middle Aramaic, while using Koine Greek for commercial and diplomatic purposes. The Hellenistic period of West Asia influenced the culture of Palmyra, which produced distinctive art and architecture that combined different Mediterranean traditions. The city's inhabitants worshiped local Semitic, Mesopotamian, and Arab deities.

By the third century, Palmyra had become a prosperous regional center. It reached the apex of its power in the 260s, when the Palmyrene King Odaenathus defeated the Sasanian emperor Shapur I. The king was succeeded by queen regent Zenobia, who rebelled against Rome and established the Palmyrene Empire. In 273, Roman emperor Aurelian levelled the city, which was later restored by Diocletian at a reduced size. The Palmyrenes converted to Christianity during the fourth century and to Islam in the centuries following the conquest by the seventh-century Rashidun Caliphate, after which the Palmyrene and Greek languages were replaced by Arabic.

Before 273 AD, Palmyra enjoyed autonomy and was attached to the Roman province of Syria, having its political organization influenced by the Greek city-state model during the first two centuries AD. The city became a Roman colonia during the third century, leading to the incorporation of Roman governing institutions, before becoming a monarchy in 260. Following its razing in 273, Palmyra became a minor center under the Byzantines and later empires. Its destruction by the Timurids in 1400 reduced it to a small village. Under French Mandatory rule in 1932, the inhabitants were moved into the new village of Tadmur, and the ancient site became available for excavations. During the Syrian civil war in 2015, the Islamic State captured Palmyra and destroyed large parts of the ancient city, which was recaptured by the Syrian Army on 2 March 2017. It was then captured by the Syrian Free Army after the fall of the Assad government in December 2024.

== Etymology ==
Records of the name "Tadmor" date from the early second millennium BC; 18th-century BC tablets from Mari written in cuneiform record the name as "Ta-ad-mi-ir", while Assyrian inscriptions of the 11th century BC record it as "Ta-ad-mar". Palmyrene inscriptions themselves showed two variants of the name; TDMR (i.e., Tadmar) and TDMWR (i.e., Tadmor). The etymology of the name is unclear; the standard interpretation, supported by Albert Schultens, connects it to the Semitic word for "date palm", tamar (תמר), (Note: The Semitic word T.M.R is the common root for the words that designate palm dates in Arabic, Hebrew, Ge'ez and other Semitic languages. Schultens argued that in the Bible (1 Kings 9:18), the name is written "Tamor" in the text and "Tadmor" in the margin. Schultens considered "Tamor" to be the original name and derived from "Tamar". However, the inclusion of a -d- in "Tamar" cannot be explained.) thus referring to the palm trees that surrounded the city.

The Greek name Παλμύρα (Latinized Palmyra) was first recorded by Pliny the Elder in the first century AD. It was used throughout the Greco-Roman world. It is generally believed that "Palmyra" derives from "Tadmor" and linguists have presented two possibilities; one view holds that Palmyra was an alteration of Tadmor. According to the suggestion by Schultens, "Palmyra" could have arisen as a corruption of "Tadmor", via an unattested form "Talmura", changed to "Palmura" by the influence of the Latin word palma (date "palm"), in reference to the city's palm trees, then the name reached its final form "Palmyra". The second view, supported by some philologists, such as Jean Starcky, holds that Palmyra is a translation of "Tadmor" (assuming that it meant palm), which had derived from the Greek word for palm, "palame".

An alternative suggestion connects the name to the Syriac tedmurtā (ܬܕܡܘܪܬܐ) "miracle", hence tedmurtā "object of wonder", from the root dmr "to wonder"; this possibility was mentioned favourably by Franz Altheim and Ruth Altheim-Stiehl (1973), but rejected by Jean Starcky (1960) and Michael Gawlikowski (1974). Michael Patrick O'Connor (1988) suggested that the names "Palmyra" and "Tadmor" originated in the Hurrian language. As evidence, he cited the inexplicability of alterations to the theorized roots of both names (represented in the addition of -d- to tamar and -ra- to palame). According to this theory, "Tadmor" derives from the Hurrian word tad ("to love") with the addition of the typical Hurrian mid vowel rising (mVr) formant mar. Similarly, according to this theory, "Palmyra" derives from the Hurrian word pal ("to know") using the same mVr formant (mar).

== Region and city layout ==
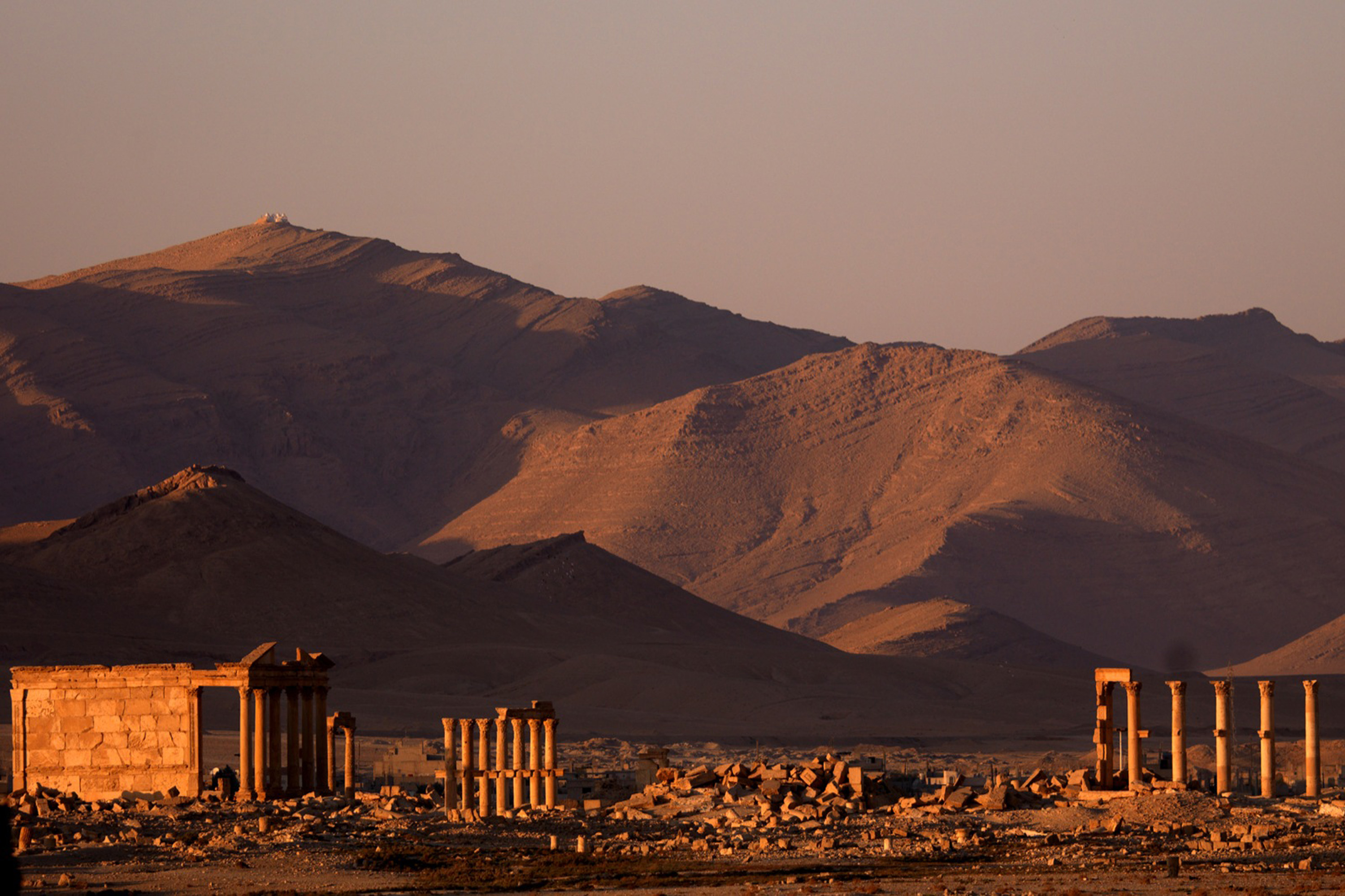
The northern Palmyrene mountain belt

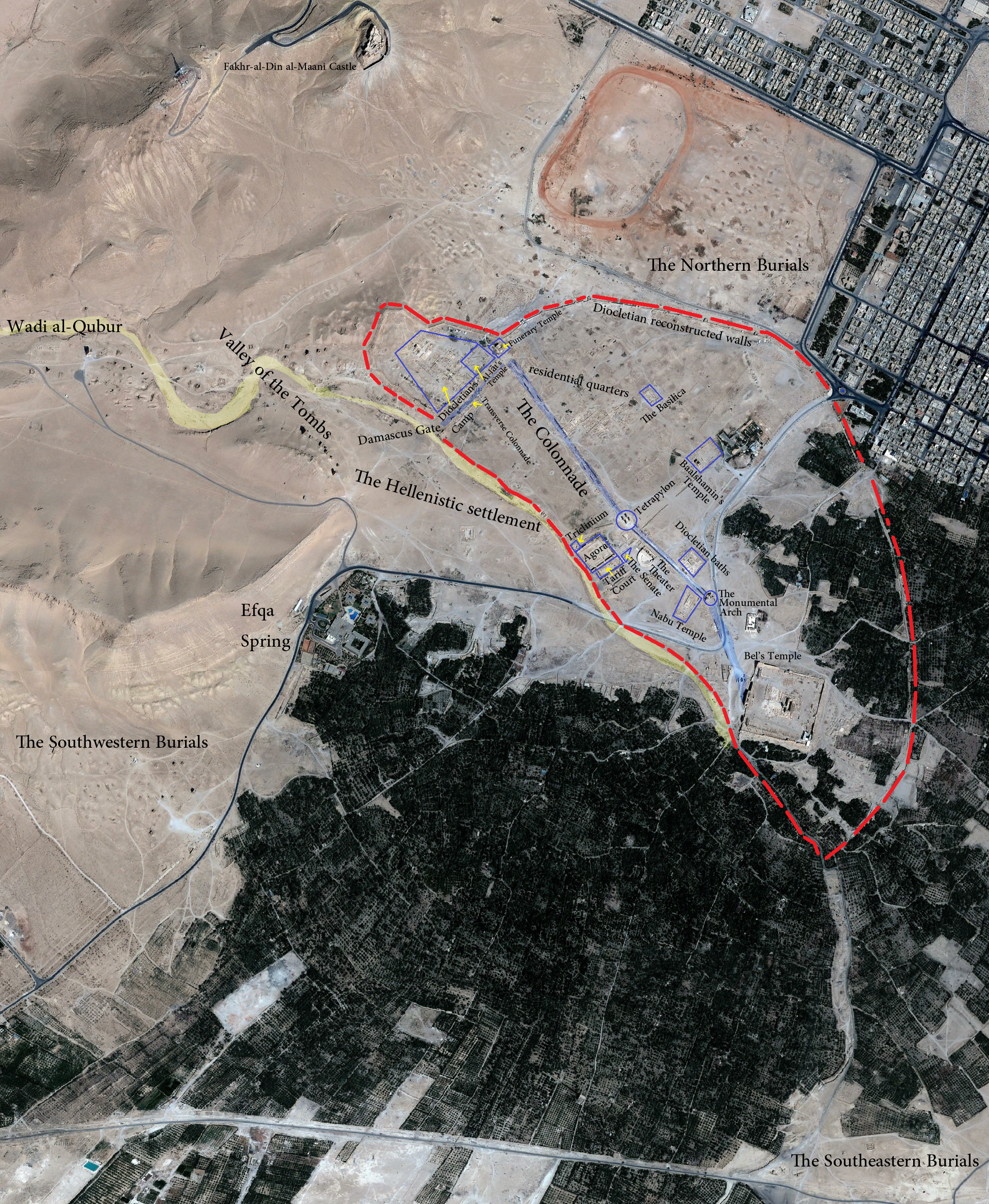
Palmyra's landmarks

The city of Palmyra lies 215 km (134 mi) northeast of the Syrian capital, Damascus; along with an expanded hinterland of several settlements, farms, and forts, the city forms part of the region known as Palmyrena or Palmyrene. The city is located in an oasis surrounded by palms (of which twenty varieties have been reported). Two mountain ranges overlook the city - the northern Palmyrene mountain belt from the north and the southern Palmyrene mountains from the southwest. In the south and the east Palmyra is exposed to the Syrian Desert. A small wadi, al-Qubur (Valley of the Tombs), crosses the area, flowing from the western hills past the city before disappearing in the eastern gardens of the oasis. South of the wadi is a spring, Efqa. Pliny the Elder described the town in the 70s AD as famous for its desert location, for the richness of its soil, and for the springs surrounding it, which made agriculture and herding possible. (Note: Pliny mentioned that Palmyra was independent, but by AD 70, Palmyra was part of the Roman empire; modern scholars dismiss Pliny's account of Palmyra's political situation, considering it to rely on older accounts dating to the period of Octavian, when Palmyra was independent.)

=== Layout ===
Palmyra began as a small Neolithic settlement near the Efqa spring on the southern bank of Wadi al-Qubur. The much later Hellenistic settlement of Palmyra was also located near the Efqa spring on the southern bank of Wadi al-Qubur. It had its residences expanding to the wadi's northern bank during the first century. Although the city's walls at the time of Zenobia originally enclosed an extensive area on both banks of the wadi, the walls rebuilt during Aurelian's reign surrounded only the northern-bank section. Most of the city's monumental projects were built on the wadi's northern bank, among them is the Temple of Bel, on a tell which was the site of an earlier temple (known as the Hellenistic temple). However, excavation supports the theory that the tell was originally located on the southern bank, and the wadi was diverted south of the tell to incorporate the temple into Palmyra's late first and early second century urban organization on the north bank.

Also north of the wadi was the Great Colonnade, Palmyra's 1.1-kilometre-long (0.68 mi) main street, which extended from the Temple of Bel in the east, to the Funerary Temple no.86 in the city's western part. It had a monumental arch in its eastern section, and a tetrapylon stands in the center. The Baths of Diocletian were on the left side of the colonnade. Nearby were residences, the Temple of Baalshamin, and the Byzantine churches, which include "Basilica IV", Palmyra's largest church. The church is dated to the Justinian age, its columns are estimated to be 7 metres (23 ft) high, and its base measured 27.5 by 47.5 metres (90 by 156 ft).

The Temple of Nabu and the Roman theater were built on the colonnade's southern side. Behind the theater were a small senate building and the large agora, with the remains of a triclinium (banquet room) and the Tariff Court. A cross street at the western end of the colonnade leads to the Camp of Diocletian, built by Sosianus Hierocles (the Roman governor of Syria in the reign of Diocletian). Nearby are the Temple of Al-lāt and the Damascus Gate.

== Society ==
=== Demographic history ===
The earliest known inhabitants were the Amorites in the early second millennium BC, and by the end of the millennium, Arameans were mentioned as inhabiting the area. Arabs arrived in the city in the late first millennium BC, as evidenced by the presence of Zabdibel on the side of the Seleucids in the battle of Raphia (217 BC). He was mentioned as the commander of "the Arabs and neighbouring tribes to the number of ten thousands"; Zabdibel and his men were not actually identified as Palmyrenes in the texts, but the name "Zabdibel" is a Palmyrene name leading to the conclusion that he hailed from Palmyra. The Arab newcomers were assimilated by the earlier inhabitants, used Palmyrene as a mother tongue, and formed a significant segment of the aristocracy.

The classical city also had a Jewish community; Palmyrene inscriptions from the Beit She'arim necropolis in Lower Galilee confirm the burial of Palmyrene Jews. Greeks existence in the city was limited during the Roman period. Occasionally and rarely, members of the Palmyrene families took Greek names while ethnic Greeks were few; the majority of people with Greek names, who did not belong to one of the city's families, were freed slaves. The Palmyrenes seem to have considered the Greeks foreigners, and restricted their settlement in the city.

At its height during the reign of Zenobia (around 270), Palmyra had more than 200,000 residents. (Note: Estimates vary from as low as 30,000 to 200,000; the latter number is doubted considering the environment of Palmyra and its hinterland which makes it difficult to provide the population with the necessary foodstuff.) The city's population shrank following the city's integration to the Roman Empire following the rebellion of Zenobia and during the succeeding Umayyad Caliphate, Palmyra was mainly inhabited by the Banu Kalb. Benjamin of Tudela recorded the existence of 2000 Jews in the city during the twelfth century. Palmyra declined after its destruction by Timur in 1400, and was a village of 6,000 inhabitants at the beginning of the 20th century.

=== Ethnic identity of classical Palmyra ===
Palmyra's population was a mixture of the different peoples inhabiting the city, which is seen in Aramaic, Arabic and Amorite names of Palmyrene clans, (Note: E.g for Aramaic: Gaddibol and Yedi'bel. E.g for Arab: Bene Ma'zin. E.g for Amorite: Zmr' and Kohen-Nadu.) but the ethnicity of Palmyra is a matter of debate.

Some scholars, such as Andrew M. Smith II, consider ethnicity a concept related to modern nationalism, and prefer not to describe the Palmyrenes with ethnic designations they themselves did not know, concluding that there is a lack of evidence regarding what ethnicity the Palmyrenes perceived themselves. On the other hand, many scholars, such as Eivind Seland, contend that a distinctive Palmyrene ethnicity is apparent in the available contemporary evidence. The second century work De Munitionibus Castrorum mentioned the Palmyrenes as a natio, the Latin equivalent of the Greek ἔθνος (éthnos). Seland noted the epigraphic evidence left by the Palmyrenes outside the city.

Palmyrene inscriptions reveal the existence of a real diaspora satisfying the three criteria set by the sociologist Rogers Brubaker. (Note: These criteria are: dispersion in a wide geographical range; orientation towards a homeland through the usage of own language and reference to a distinct origin and pantheon; the usage of own language and origin to preserve a distinct identity amongst host societies.) Palmyrene diaspora members always made clear their Palmyrene origin and used the Palmyrene language, and maintained their distinct religion even when the host society's religion was close to that of Palmyra. Seland concluded that in the case of Palmyra, the people perceived themselves different from their neighbours and a real Palmyrene ethnicity existed. Aside from the existence of a Palmyrene ethnicity, Aramean or Arab are the two main ethnic designations debated by historians; Javier Teixidor stated, "Palmyra was an Aramaean city and it is a mistake to consider it as an Arab town", while Yasamin Zahran criticized this statement and argued that the inhabitants considered themselves Arabs. In practice, according to several scholars such as Udo Hartmann and Michael Sommer, the citizenry of Palmyra were mainly the result of Arab and Aramaean tribes merging into a unity with a corresponding consciousness; they thought and acted as Palmyrenes.

=== Language ===
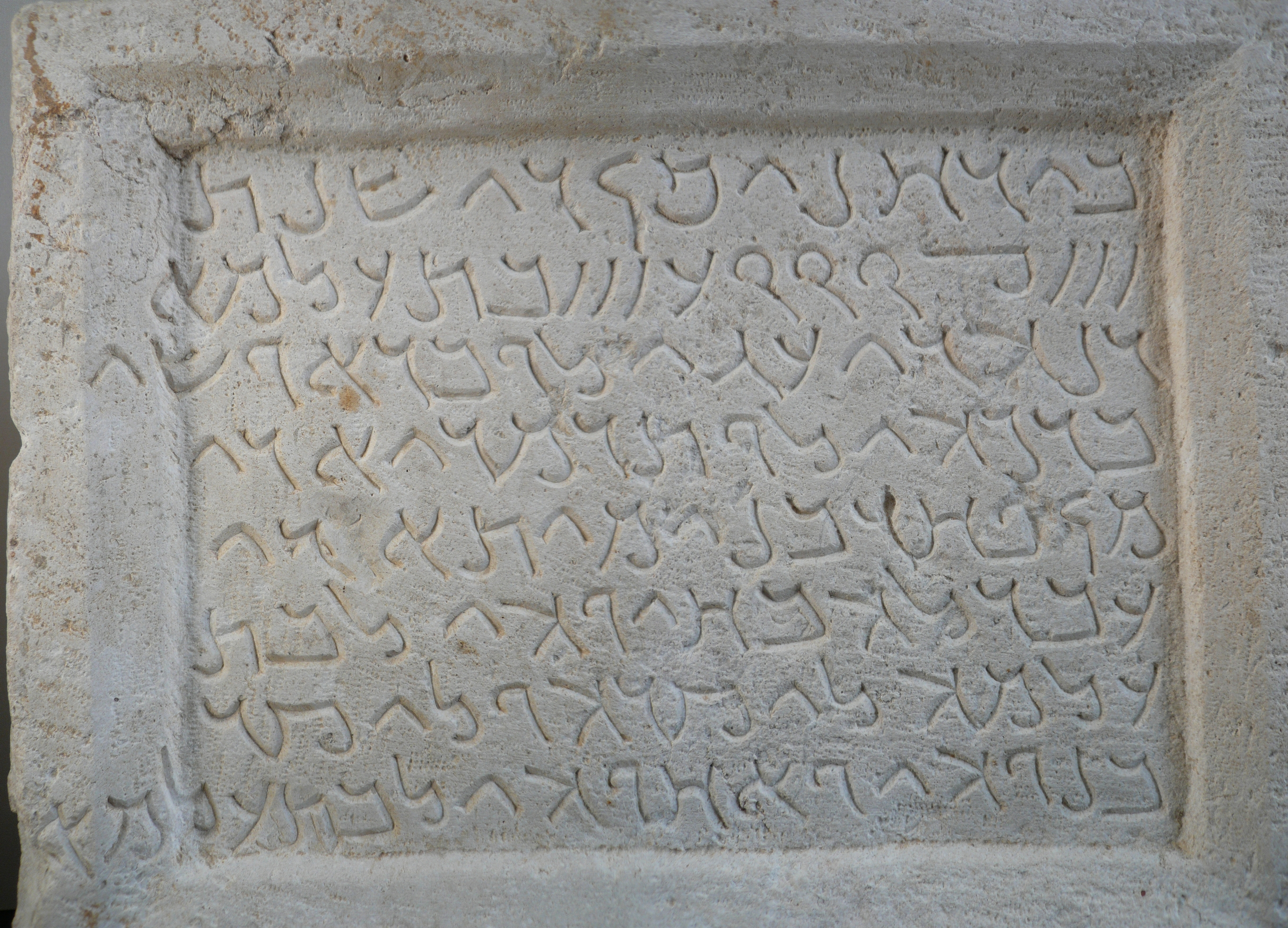
Palmyrene inscription (RES 1072)

Until the late third century, Palmyrenes spoke Palmyrene Aramaic and used the Palmyrene alphabet. The use of Latin was minimal, but Greek was used by wealthier members of society for commercial and diplomatic purposes, and it became the dominant language during the Byzantine era. There are several theories explaining the disappearance of the Palmyrene language shortly after the campaigns of Aurelian. The linguist Jean Cantineau assumed that Aurelian suppressed all aspects of Palmyrene culture, including the language, but the last Palmyrene inscription dates to 279/280, after the death of the Roman emperor in 275, thus refuting such a theory. Many scholars ascribe the disappearance of the language to a change in society resulting from the reorganization of the Eastern Roman frontier following the fall of Zenobia. The archaeologist Karol Juchniewicz ascribed it to a change in the ethnic composition of the city, resulting from the influx of people who did not speak Aramaic, probably a Roman legion. Hartmann suggested that it was a Palmyrene initiative by nobles allied to Rome attempting to express their loyalty to the emperor; Hartmann noted that Palmyrene disappeared in the written form, and that this does not mean its extinction as spoken language. After the Arab conquest, Greek was replaced by Arabic, from which, although the city was surrounded by Bedouins, a Palmyrene dialect evolved.

=== Social organization ===
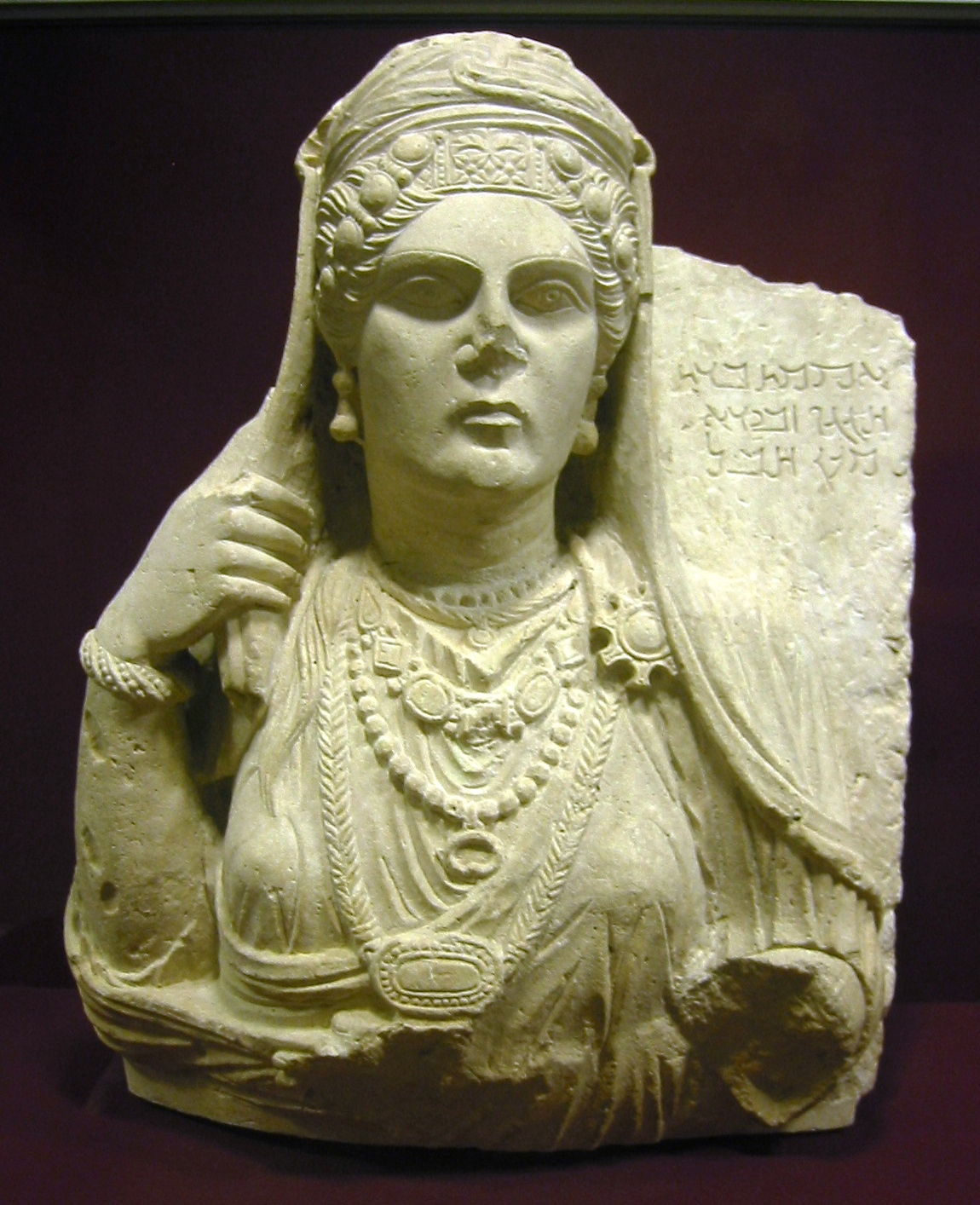
Palmyrene funerary portrait representing Aqmat, a Palmyrene aristocrat

Classical Palmyra was a tribal community, but due to the lack of sources, an understanding of the nature of Palmyrene tribal structure is not possible. Thirty clans have been documented; five of which were identified as tribes (Phylai Koine Greek: Φυλαί, pl. of Phyle Φυλή) comprising several sub-clans. (Note: The Phylai are the Bene Mita, Komare, Mattabol, Ma'zin and Claudia.) By the time of Nero, Palmyra had four tribes, each residing in an area of the city bearing its name. Three of the tribes were the Komare, Mattabol and Ma'zin; the fourth tribe is uncertain, but was probably the Mita.

In time, the four tribes became highly civic and tribal lines blurred; (Note: In general, a civic tribe (Phyle) is a collection of people chosen from the collective population and ascribed a deity as a tribal ancestor, then assigned a territory for them to reside in. The Phylai were united by their citizenship instead of origin.) by the second century clan identity lost its importance, and it disappeared during the third century. (Note: The clans might have gathered under the name of the four tribes causing them to disappear.) Even the four tribes ceased to be important by the third century as only one inscription mentions a tribe after the year 212; instead, aristocrats played the decisive role in the city's social organization. Women seem to have been active in Palmyra's social and public life. They commissioned inscriptions, buildings or tombs, and in certain cases, held administrative offices. Offerings to gods in the names of women are documented.

The last Palmyrene inscription of 279/280 refers to the honoring of a citizen by the Maththabolians, which indicates that the tribal system still carried weight after the fall of Zenobia. A noticeable change is the lack of development of aristocratic residences, and no important public buildings were constructed by locals, indicating that the elite diminished following the campaign of Aurelian. The social change and the reduction of the aristocratic elite is hard to explain. It could be a result of the aristocracy suffering many casualties in the war against Rome, or fleeing to the countryside. According to historian Emanuele Intagliata, the change can be ascribed to the Roman reorganization following Zenobia's fall, as Palmyra ceased to be a rich caravan city and became a frontier fortress, leading the inhabitants to focus on satisfying the needs of a garrison instead of providing the empire with luxurious oriental items. Such a change in functions would have made the city less attractive for an aristocratic elite.

Palmyra benefited from Umayyad rule, since its role as a frontier city ended and the East-West trade route was restored, leading to the re-emergence of a merchant class. Palmyra's loyalty to the Umayyads led to an aggressive military retaliation from their successors, the Abbasid Caliphate, and the city diminished in size, losing its merchant class. Following its destruction by Timur, Palmyra maintained the life of a small settlement until its relocation in 1932.

=== Culture ===
The scarce artifacts found in the city dating to the Bronze Age reveal that, culturally, Palmyra was most affiliated with western Syria. Classical Palmyra had a distinctive culture, based on a local Semitic tradition, and influenced by Greece and Rome. (Note: E.g. by the second century AD, Palmyrene goddess Al-lāt was portrayed in the style of the Greek goddess Athena, and named Athena-Al-lāt. However, this assimilation of Al-lāt to Athena did not extend beyond iconography.) To appear better integrated into the Roman Empire, some Palmyrenes adopted Greco-Roman names, either alone or in addition to a second native name. The extent of Greek influence on Palmyra's culture is debated. Scholars interpreted the Palmyrenes' Greek practices differently; many see those characters as a superficial layer over a local essence. Palmyra's senate was an example; although Palmyrene texts written in Greek described it as a "boule" (a Greek institution), the senate was a gathering of non-elected tribal elders (a Near-Eastern assembly tradition). Others view Palmyra's culture as a fusion of local and Greco-Roman traditions.

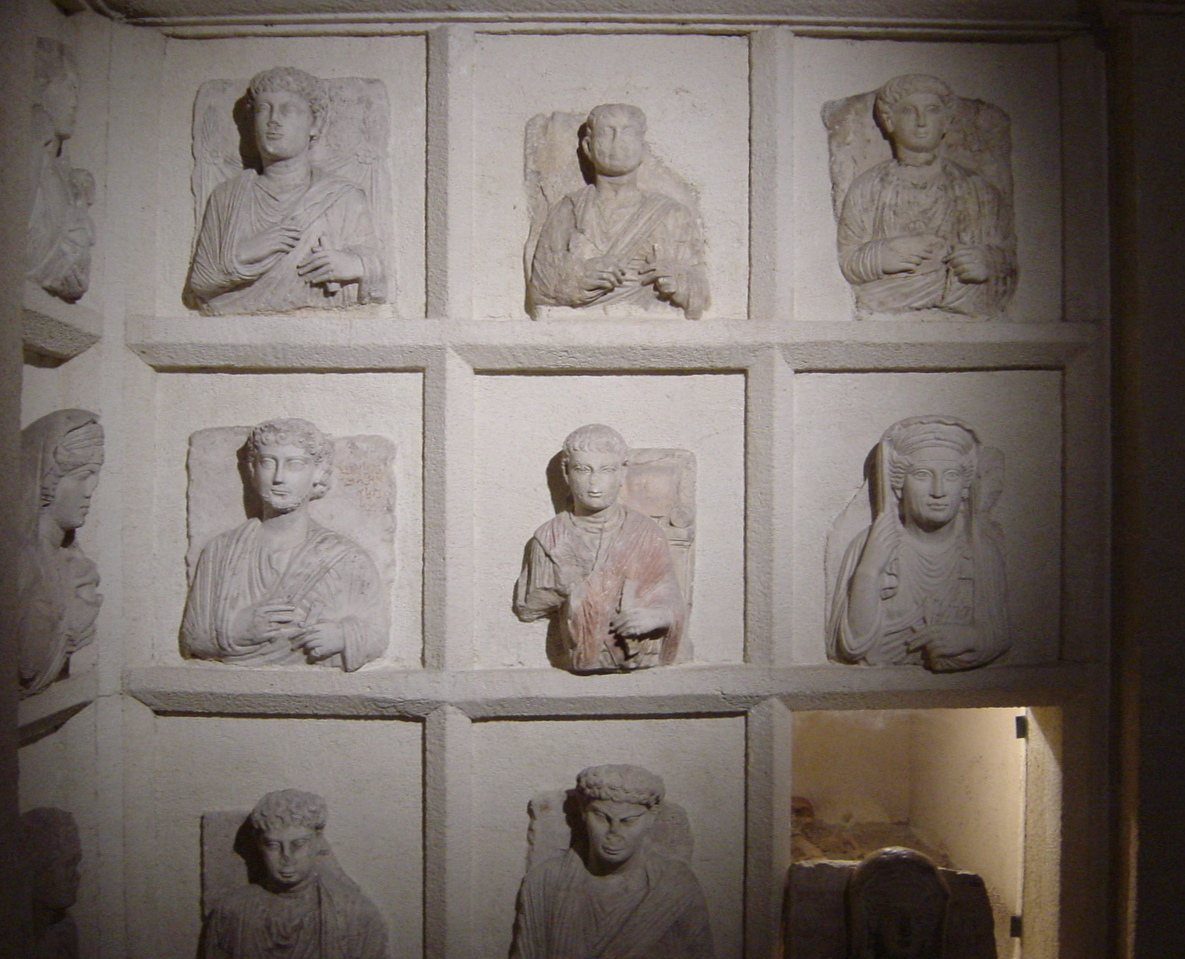
Palmyrene loculi (burial chambers) reassembled in the İstanbul Archaeological Museum

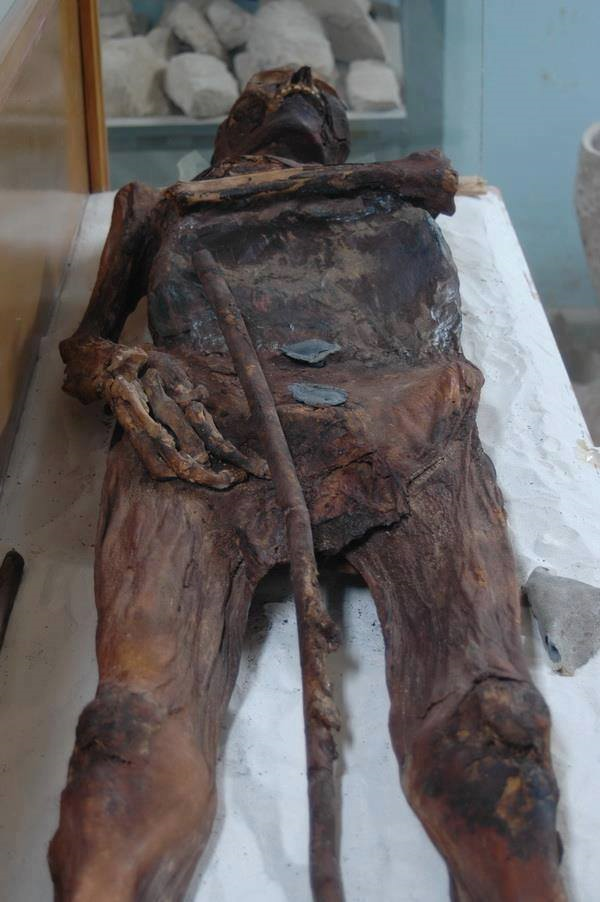
Palmyrene mummy

The culture of Persia influenced Palmyrene military tactics, dress and court ceremonies. Palmyra had no large libraries or publishing facilities, and it lacked an intellectual movement characteristic of other Eastern cities such as Edessa or Antioch. Although Zenobia opened her court to academics, the only notable scholar documented was Cassius Longinus.

Palmyra had a large agora. (Note: In the Hellenistic tradition, the agora was the center of athletic, artistic, spiritual and political life of the city.) However, unlike the Greek Agoras (public gathering places shared with public buildings), Palmyra's agora resembled an Eastern caravanserai more than a hub of public life. The Palmyrenes buried their dead in elaborate family mausoleums, most with interior walls forming rows of burial chambers (loculi) in which the dead, lying at full length, were placed. A relief of the person interred formed part of the wall's decoration, acting as a headstone. Sarcophagi appeared in the late second century and were used in some of the tombs. Many burial monuments contained mummies embalmed in a method similar to that used in Ancient Egypt.

=== Art and architecture ===
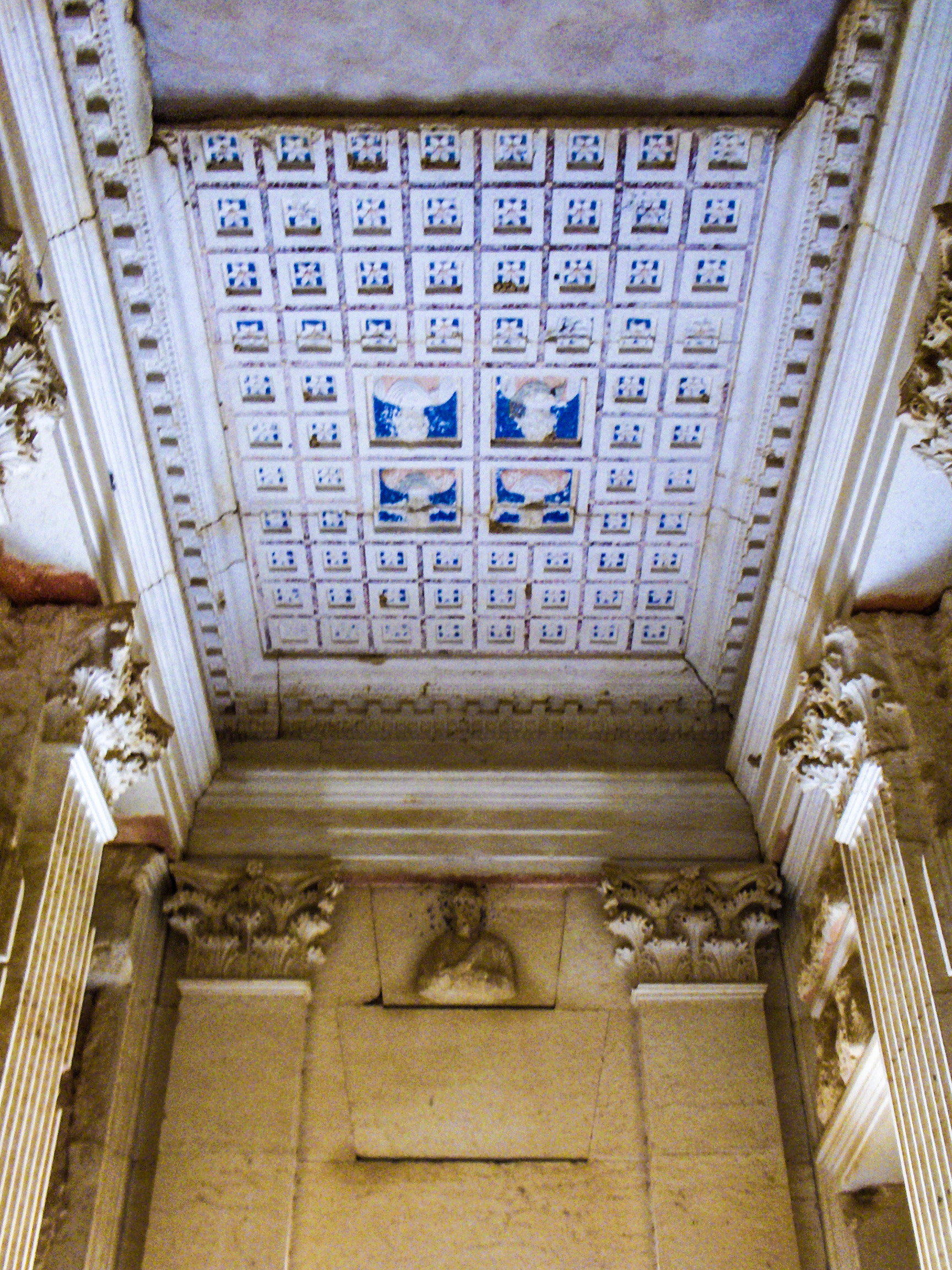
Interior of the Tower of Elahbel, in 2010

Although Palmyrene art was related to that of Greece, it had a distinctive style unique to the middle-Euphrates region. Palmyrene art is well represented by the bust reliefs which seal the openings of its burial chambers. The reliefs emphasized clothing, jewelry and a frontal representation of the person depicted, characteristics which can be seen as a forerunner of Byzantine art. According to Michael Rostovtzeff, Palmyra's art was influenced by Parthian art. However, the origin of frontality that characterized Palmyrene and Parthian arts is a controversial issue; while Parthian origin has been suggested (by Daniel Schlumberger), Michael Avi-Yonah contends that it was a local Syrian tradition that influenced Parthian art. Little painting, and none of the bronze statues of prominent citizens (which stood on brackets on the main columns of the Great Colonnade), have survived. A damaged frieze and other sculptures from the Temple of Bel, many removed to museums in Syria and abroad, suggest the city's public monumental sculpture.

Many surviving funerary busts reached Western museums during the 19th century. Palmyra provided the most convenient Eastern examples bolstering an art-history controversy at the turn of the 20th century: to what extent Eastern influence on Roman art replaced idealized classicism with frontal, hieratic and simplified figures (as believed by Josef Strzygowski and others). This transition is seen as a response to cultural changes in the Western Roman Empire, rather than artistic influence from the East. Palmyrene bust reliefs, unlike Roman sculptures, are rudimentary portraits; although many reflect high quality individuality, the majority vary little across figures of similar age and gender.

Like its art, Palmyra's architecture was influenced by the Greco-Roman style, while preserving local elements (best seen in the Temple of Bel). (Note: There are hints of Greek training; the names of three Greeks who worked on the construction of the Temple of Bel are known through inscriptions, including a probably Greek architect named Alexandras (Αλεξάνδρας). However, some Palmyrenes adopted Greco-Roman names and native citizens with the name Alexander are attested in the city.) Enclosed by a massive wall flanked with traditional Roman columns, Bel's sanctuary plan was primarily Semitic. Similar to the Second Temple, the sanctuary consisted of a large courtyard with the deity's main shrine off-center against its entrance (a plan preserving elements of the temples of Ebla and Ugarit).

== Site ==
=== Cemeteries ===
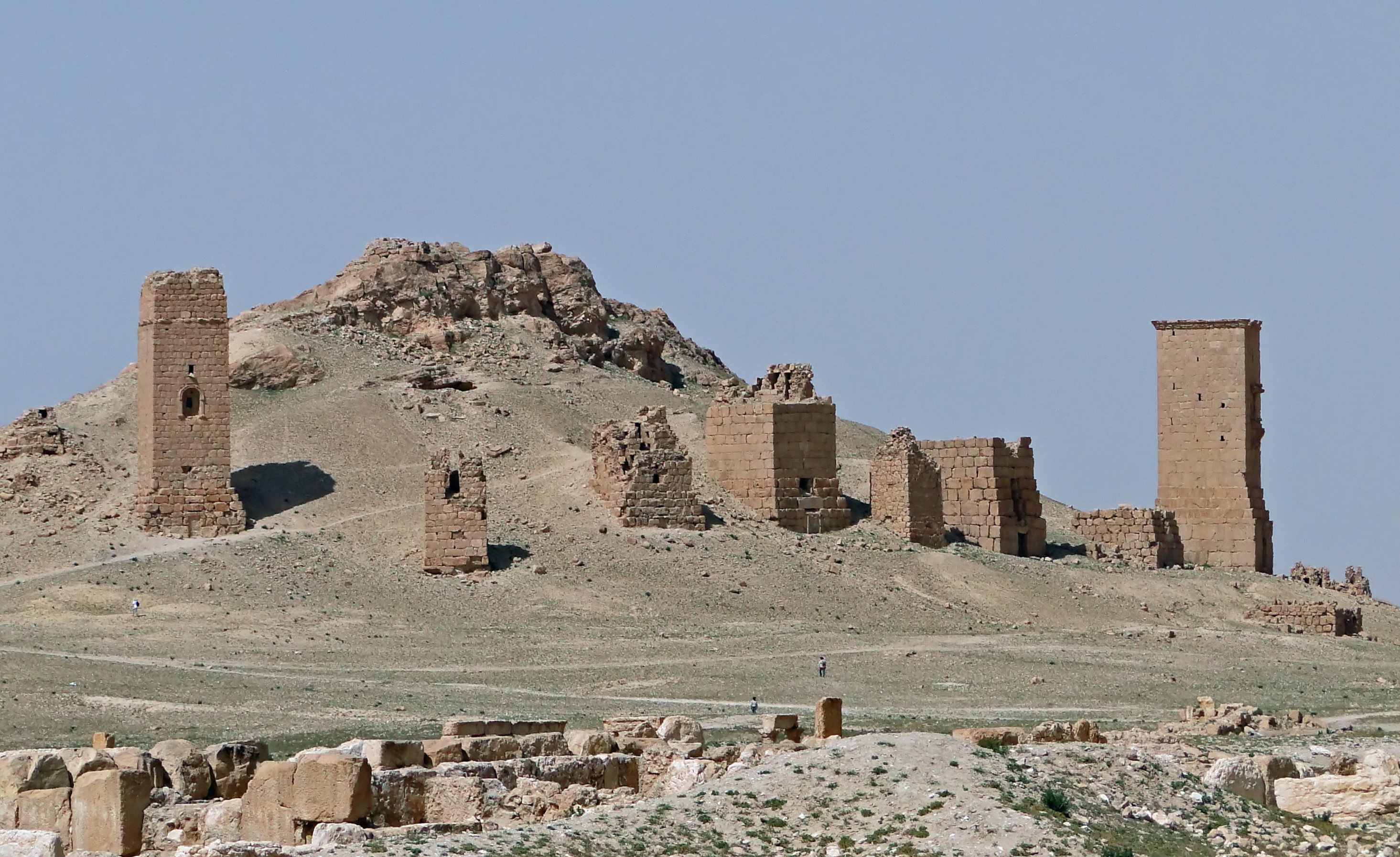
Valley of Tombs in 2010

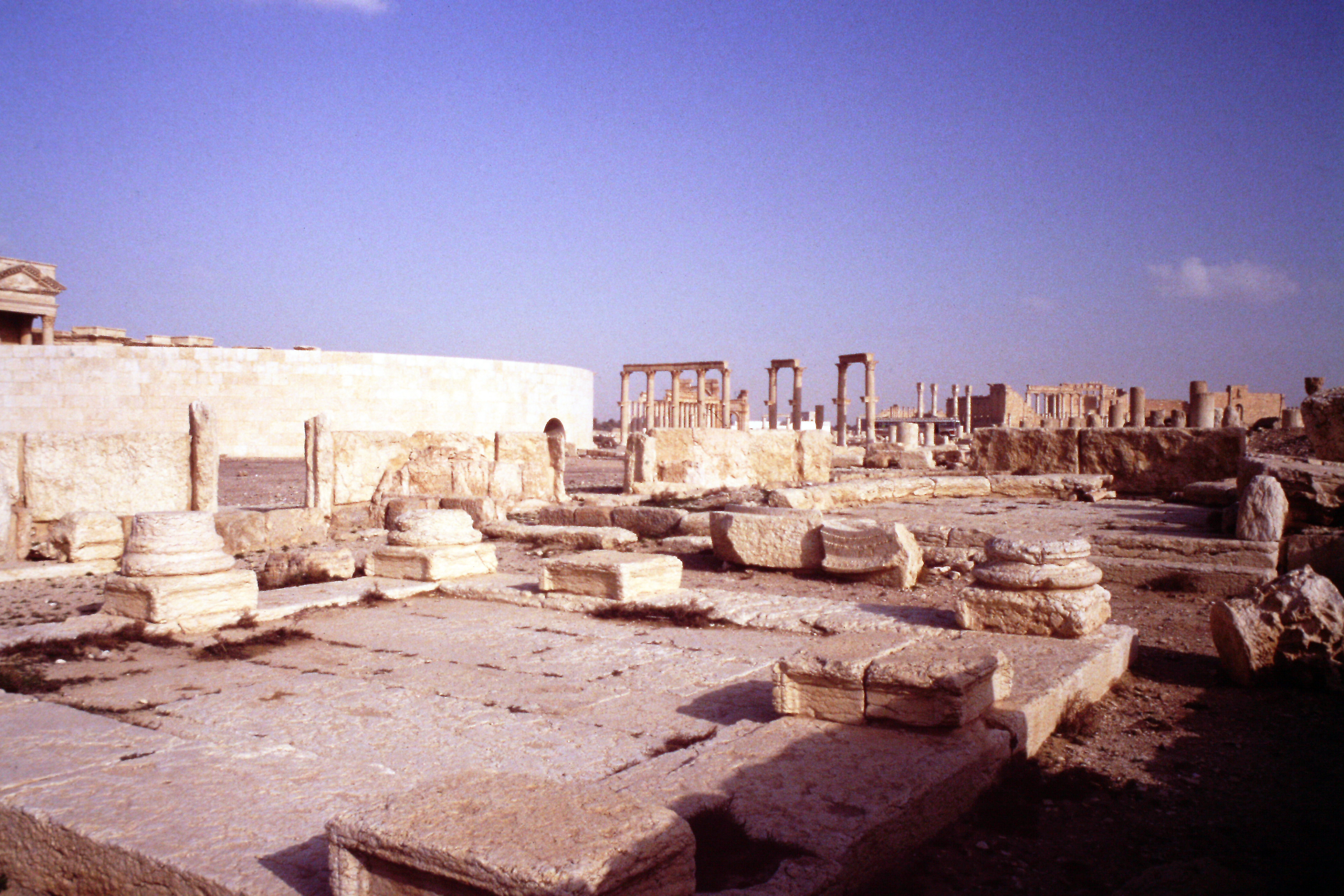
The senate

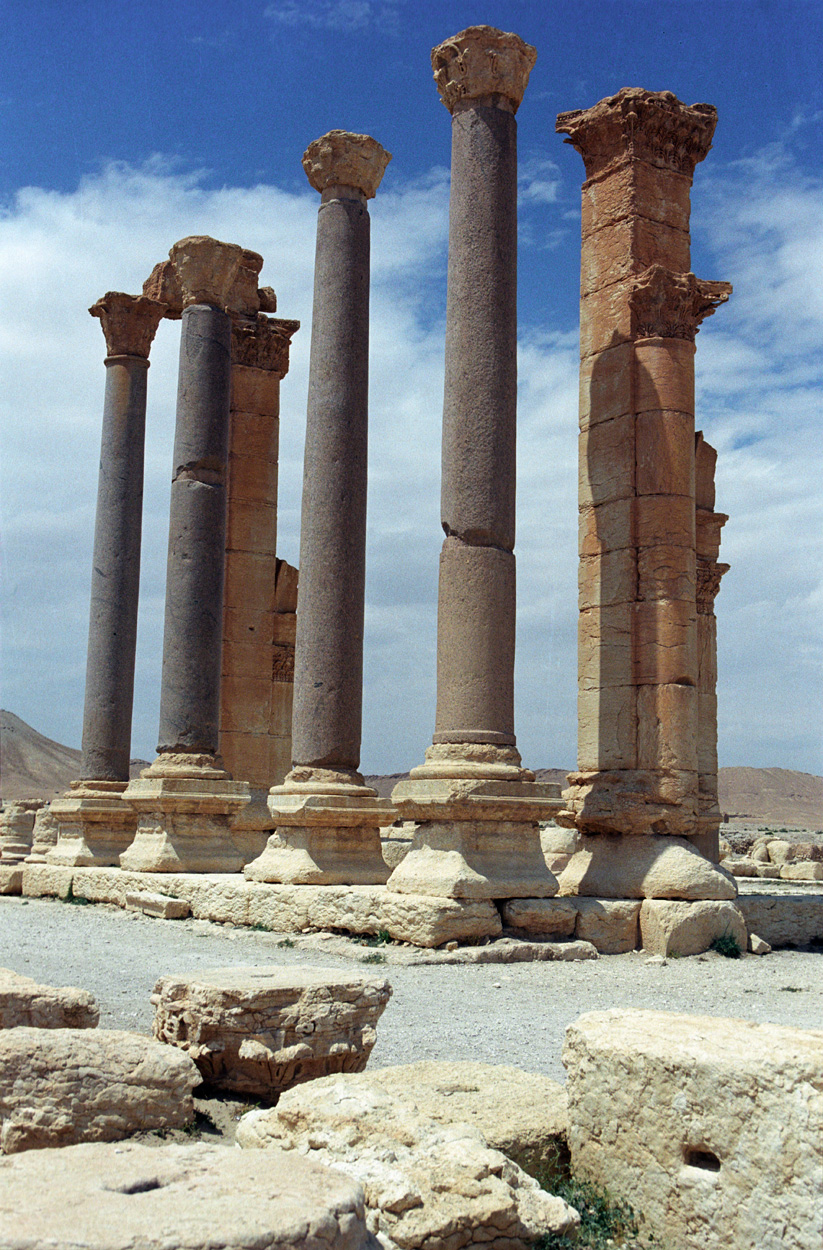
Baths of Diocletian

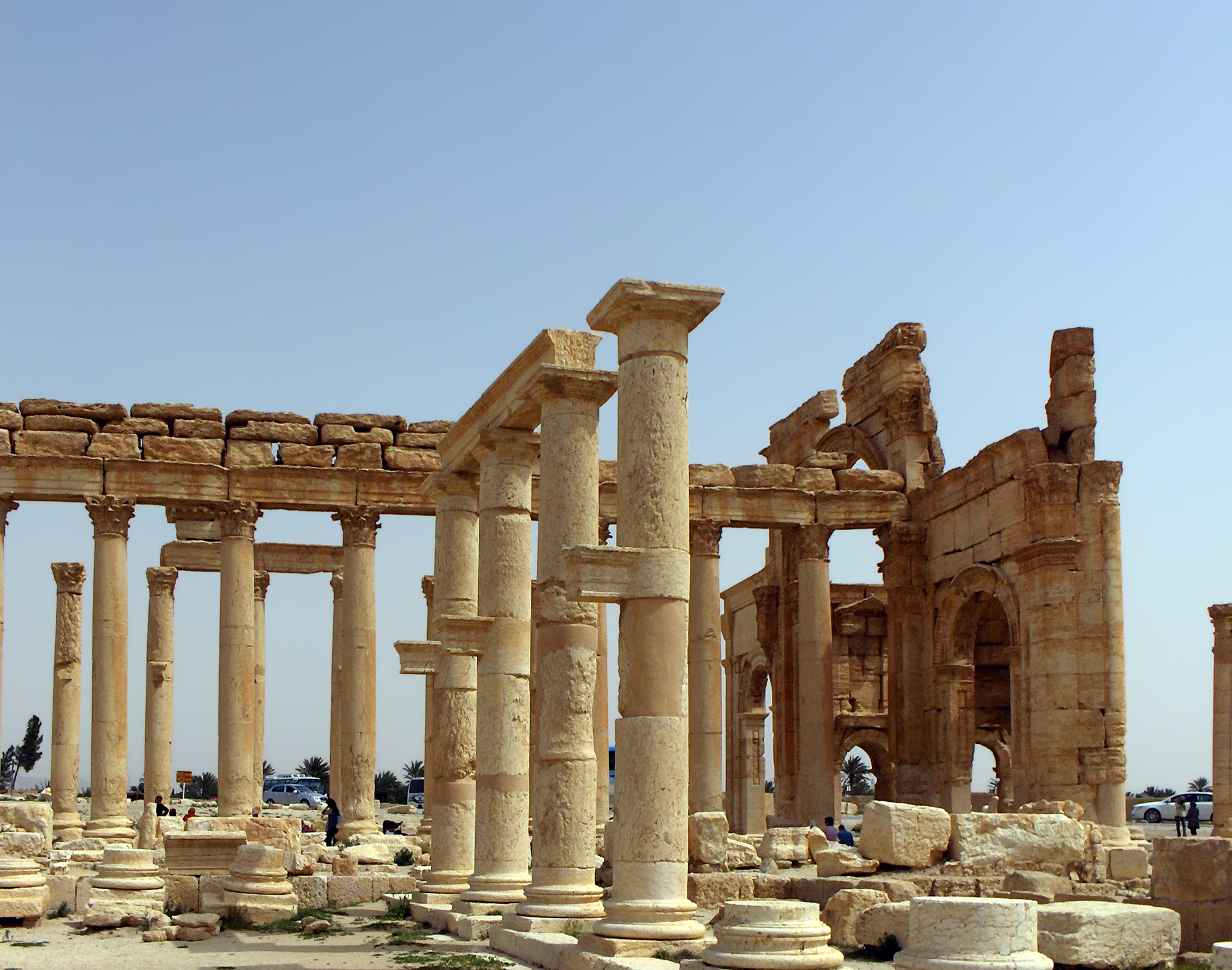
Temple of Nabu, in 2010

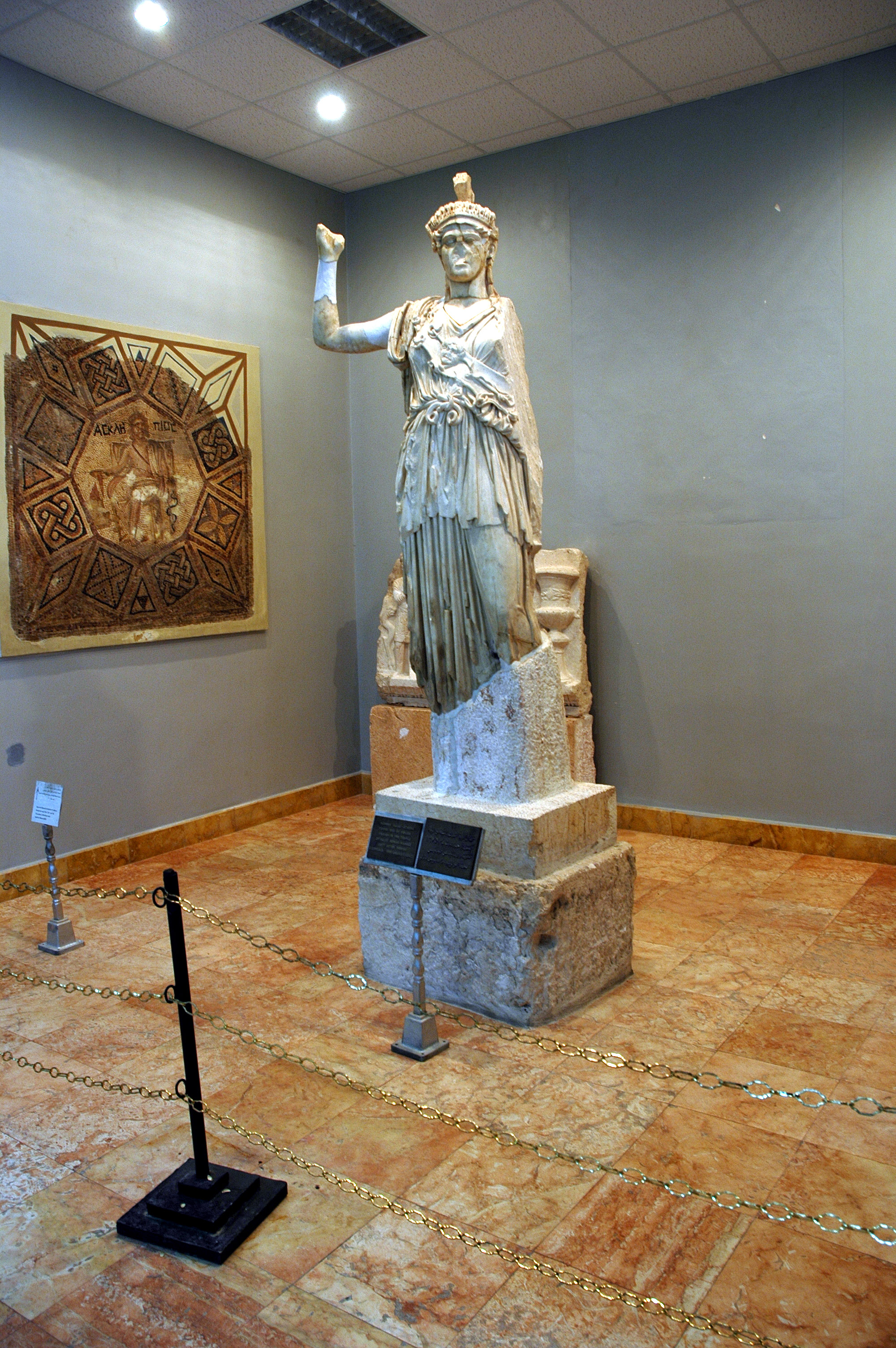
The statue of Al-lāt (equated with Athena) found in its temple (destroyed in 2015)

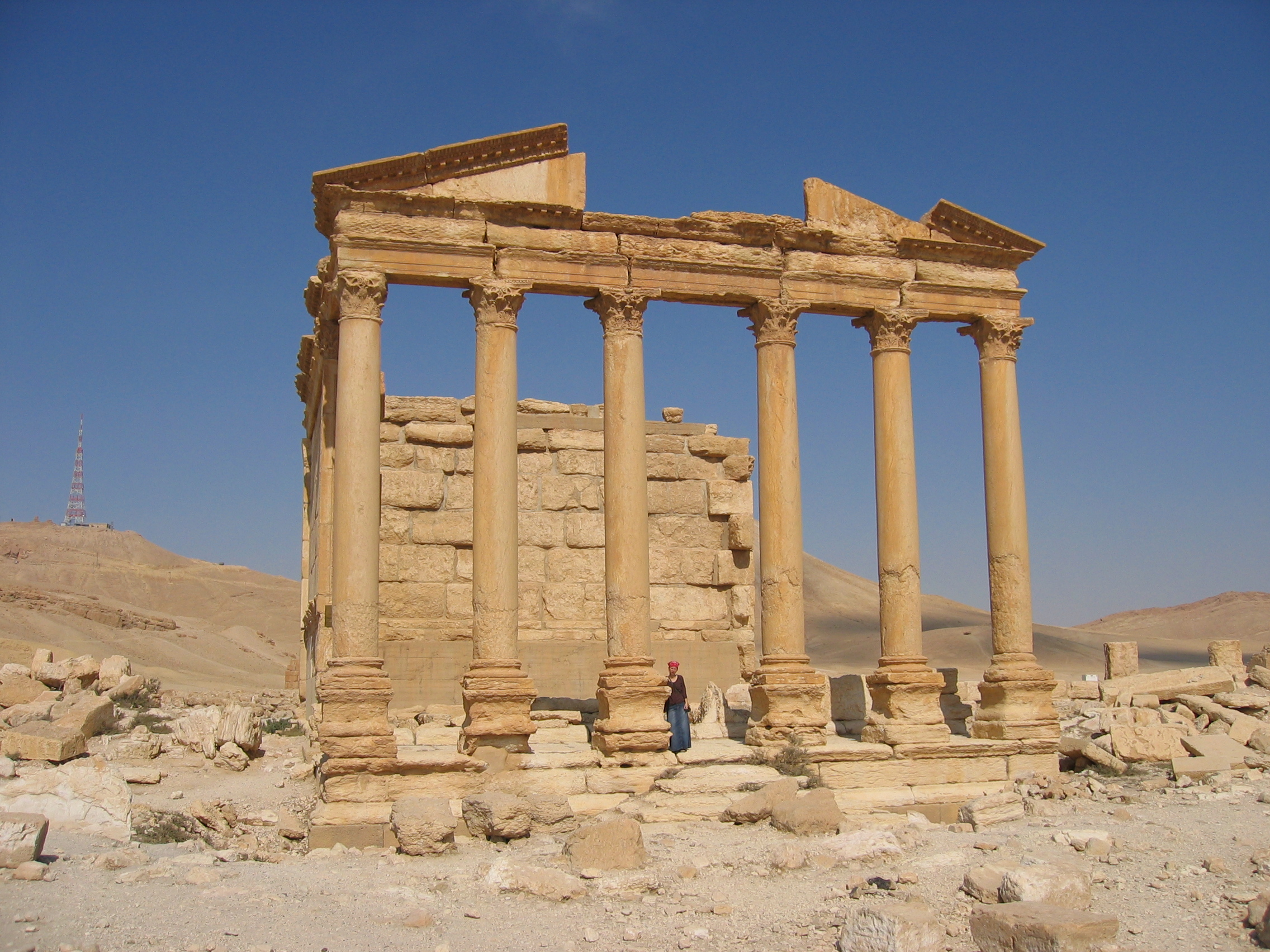
The Funerary Temple no.86

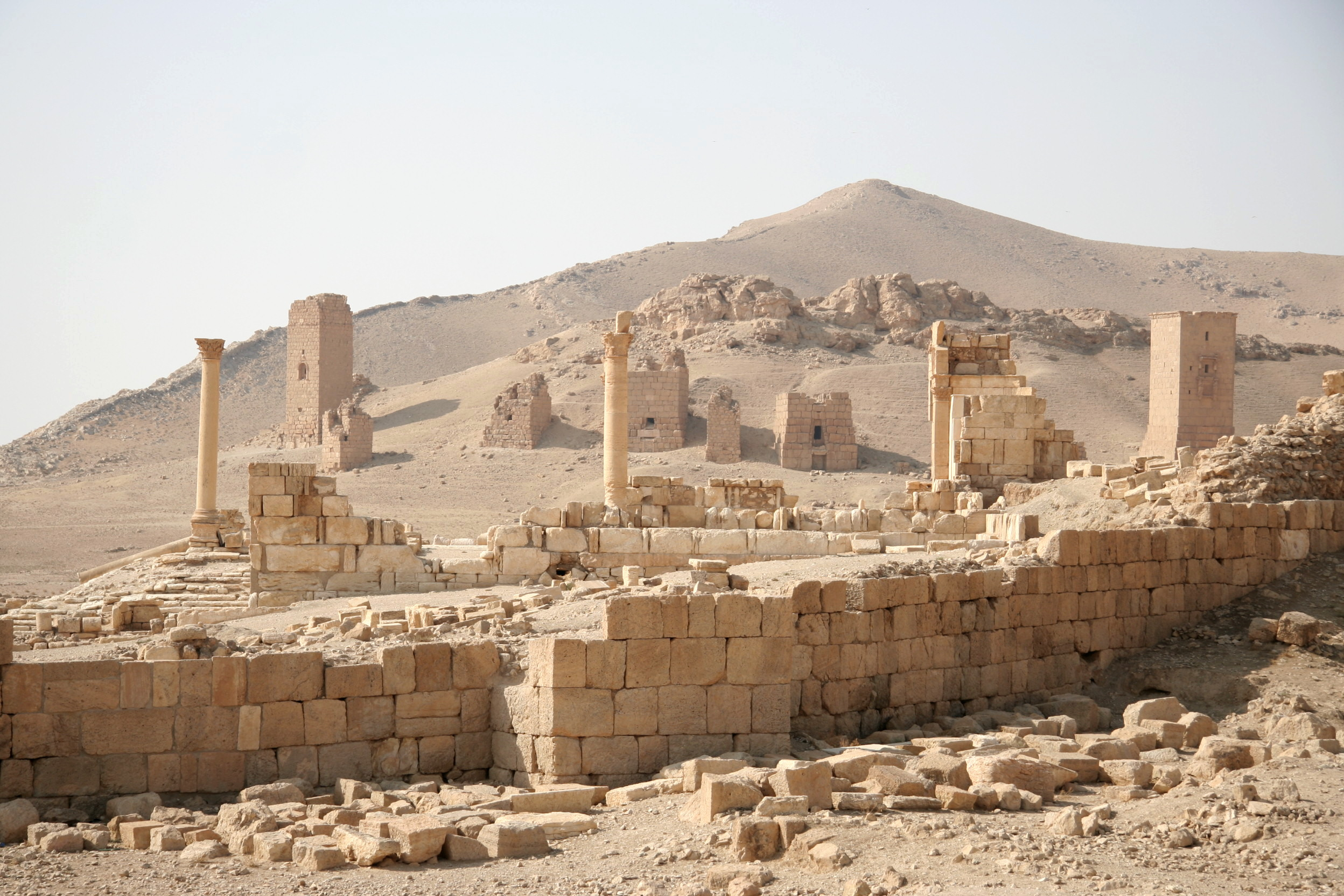
Diocletian's walls

West of the ancient walls, the Palmyrenes built a number of large-scale funerary monuments which now form the Valley of Tombs, a one-kilometre-long (0.62 mi) necropolis. The more than 50 monuments were primarily tower-shaped and up to four stories high. Towers were replaced by funerary temples in the first half of the second century AD, as the most recent tower is dated to AD 128. The city had other cemeteries in the north, southwest and southeast, where the tombs are primarily hypogea (underground).

=== Notable structures ===
==== Public buildings ====
- The senate building is largely ruined. It is a small building that consists of a peristyle courtyard and a chamber that has an apse at one end and rows of seats around it.
- Much of the Baths of Diocletian are ruined and do not survive above the level of the foundations. The complex's entrance is marked by four massive Egyptian granite columns each 1.3 metres (4 ft 3 in) in diameter, 12.5 metres (41 ft) high and weigh 20 tonnes. Inside, the outline of a bathing pool surrounded by a colonnade of Corinthian columns is still visible in addition to an octagonal room that served as a dressing room containing a drain in its center. Sossianus Hierocles, a governor under Emperor Diocletian, claimed to have built the baths, but the building was probably erected in the late second century and Sossianus Hierocles renovated it. (Note: The historian Rudolf Fellmann suggested that this building was the royal palace.)
- The Agora of Palmyra is part of a complex that also includes the tariff court and the triclinium, built in the second half of the first century AD. The agora is a massive 71-by-84-metre (233 by 276 ft) structure with 11 entrances. Inside the agora, 200 columnar bases that used to hold statues of prominent citizens were found. The inscriptions on the bases allowed an understanding of the order by which the statues were grouped; the eastern side was reserved for senators, the northern side for Palmyrene officials, the western side for soldiers and the southern side for caravan chiefs.
- The Tariff Court is a large rectangular enclosure south of the agora and sharing its northern wall with it. Originally, the entrance of the court was a massive vestibule in its southwestern wall. However, the entrance was blocked by the construction of a defensive wall and the court was entered through three doors from the Agora. The court gained its name by containing a 5-metre (16 ft) stone slab that had the Palmyrene tax law inscribed on it.
- The Triclinium of the Agora is at the northwestern corner of the Agora and can host up to 40 people. It is a small 12-by-15-metre (39 by 49 ft) hall decorated with Greek key motifs that run in a continuous line halfway up the wall. The building was probably used by the rulers of the city; the French general director of antiquities in Syria, Henri Seyrig, proposed that it was a small temple before being turned into a triclinium or banqueting hall.

==== Temples ====
- The Temple of Bel was dedicated in AD 32; it consisted of a large precinct lined by porticos; it had a rectangular shape and was oriented north-south. The exterior wall was 205-metre (673 ft) long with a propylaea, and the cella stood on a podium in the middle of the enclosure. The temple was destroyed by IS in 2015.
- The Temple of Baalshamin dates to the late 2nd century BC in its earliest phases; its altar was built in AD 115, and it was substantially rebuilt in AD 131. It consisted of a central cella and two colonnaded courtyards north and south of the central structure. A vestibule consisting of six columns preceded the cella which had its side walls decorated with pilasters in Corinthian order. IS destroyed the temple in 2015.
- The Temple of Nabu is largely ruined. The temple was Eastern in its plan; the outer enclosure's propylaea led to a 20-by-9-metre (66 by 30 ft) podium through a portico of which the bases of the columns survives. The peristyle cella opened onto an outdoor altar.
- The Temple of Al-Lat is largely ruined with only a podium, a few columns and the door frame remaining. Inside the compound, a giant lion relief (Lion of Al-lāt) was excavated and in its original form, was a relief protruding from the temple compound's wall.
- The ruined Temple of Baal-hamon was located on the top of Jabal al-Muntar hill which oversees the spring of Efqa. Constructed in AD 89, it consisted of a cella and a vestibule with two columns. The temple had a defensive tower attached to it; a mosaic depicting the sanctuary was excavated and it revealed that both the cella and the vestibule were decorated with merlons.

==== Other buildings ====
- The Monumental Arch was built in the third century and destroyed in 2015 by IS.
- The Great Colonnade was Palmyra's 1.1-kilometre-long (0.68 mi) main street; most of the columns date to the second century AD and each is 9.50 metres (31.2 ft) high.
- The Funerary Temple no. 86 (also known as the House Tomb) is located at the western end of the Great Colonnade. It was built in the third century AD and has a portico of six columns and vine patterns carvings. Inside the chamber, steps leads down to a vault crypt. The shrine might have been connected to the royal family as it is the only tomb inside the city's walls.
- The Tetrapylon was erected during the renovations of Diocletian at the end of the third century. It is a square platform and each corner contains a grouping of four columns. Each column group supports a 150-ton cornice and contains a pedestal in its center that originally carried a statue. Out of sixteen columns, only one is original while the rest are from reconstruction work by the Syrian Directorate-General of Antiquities in 1963, using concrete. The original columns were brought from Egypt and carved out of pink granite. IS damaged the structure in 2017.
- The Walls of Palmyra started in the first century as a protective wall containing gaps where the surrounding mountains formed natural barriers; it encompassed the residential areas, the gardens and the oasis. After 273, Aurelian erected the rampart known as the wall of Diocletian; it enclosed about 80 hectares, a much smaller area than the original pre-273 city.

=== Destruction by IS ===
Ancient Palmyra and its monuments were severely damaged during the Syrian Civil War, which began in 2011. Fighting between the Syrian army and opposition forces took a toll on the site, particularly as several sections were used as military bases. In 2015, the underground Tomb of the Three Brothers and parts of the North Necropolis were used for military purposes, while in 2016 a Russian military camp was established at the site. The main damage was caused by militants of IS, which occupied Palmyra on two occasions: first from May 2015 to March 2016, and again from December 2016 to March 2017. The table below provides an overview of the most important monuments severely damaged or destroyed during the war.

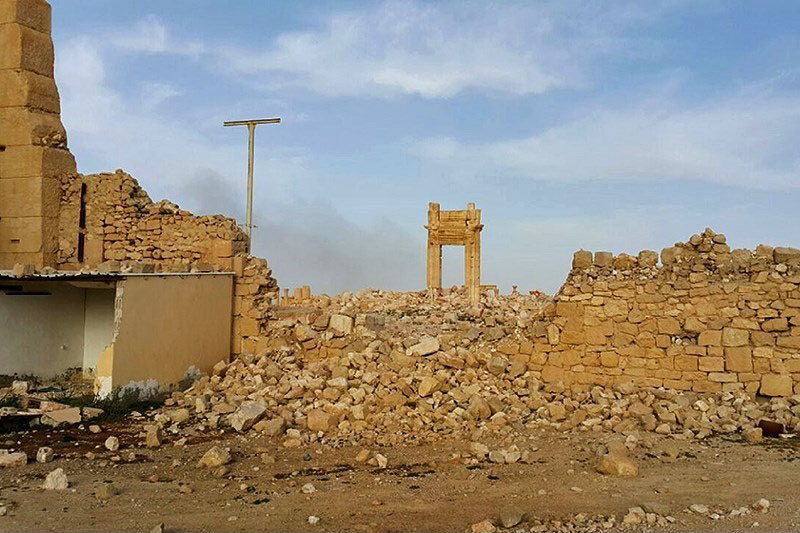
Bel's temple entrance arch remains after the destruction of the cella

Monument	Damage and aftermath
Artifacts in the Palmyra Archaeological Museum	IS smashed around 200 artifacts with hammers, including The statue of Al-lāt (Athena) whose head was left in pieces. On 23 May 2015 IS damaged the Lion of Al-lāt statue. Not all pieces were completely destroyed and the Lion of Al-lāt was restored.
Temple of Baalshamin	Completely destroyed by IS on 23 August 2015.
Temple of Bel	IS destroyed the cella of the temple on 30 August 2015. The temple's exterior walls and entrance arch remain.
Valley of the Tombs	In September 2015, it became apparent that IS had destroyed several tower and underground tombs, including the Tower of Elahbel. The damaged tombs included the Tombs of Atenatan and Iamliku, Tomb no. 71, and the tomb of Julius Aurelius Borema, among others.
The Monumental Arch	IS damaged the arch in October 2015.
The Tetrapylon and the Roman Theatre	On 20 January 2017 news emerged that IS damaged the façade of the theatre and toppled 12 of the 16 columns that formed the tetrapylon. The damage to the façade of the Roman theatre was less serious.
The Southeastern Burials	Several tombs were damaged by IS in 2017 including the Aviation Tomb.

==== Restoration ====
On 21 October 2015, using images gathered and released into the public domain by the Syrian internet advocate Bassel Khartabil between 2005 and 2012, Creative Commons started the New Palmyra project, an online repository of three-dimensional models of the city's monuments. In 2017, two Palmyrene funerary busts restored by the ISCR were sent back to Syria. The restoration of the Lion of Al-lāt took two months and the statue was displayed on 1 October 2017; it will remain in the National Museum of Damascus.

Prior to the fall of Al-Assad regime in 2024, the Russians were the main foreign partner involved in the restoration of Palmyra. To gather data that can aid the restoration of the damaged monuments, the site was researched in September 2016 and September 2019 by teams of the RAC IHMC RAS. (Note: The Rescue Archeology Center of the Institute for the History of Material Culture of the Russian Academy of Sciences) In autumn 2021 Russia and Syria agreed to launch a joint-project to restore the Monumental Arch under the scientific management of the RAC IHMC RAS, and the project was launched in 2022. The teams conducted several studies researching the construction of the arch as a first step in restoring it. Work on the arch was limited to data collection and inventarisation but no restoration took place. In 2022 the Efqa spring site was reopened after being rehabilitated by the Russian-Syrian teams. Following the fall of Al-Assad regime end of 2024 the UNESCO undertook steps to restore the site in cooperation with the Syrian government, ALIPH and the Aga Khan Trust for Culture. As of June 2026, work was limited to surveys and damage assessments.

== History ==
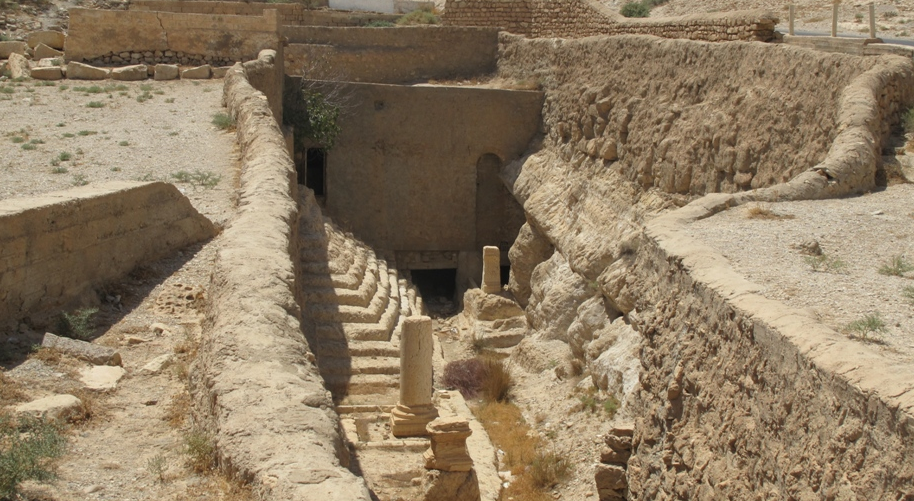
Efqa Spring, which dried up in 1994

The area has a rich history of human habitation, with evidence of Paleolithic settlements. The site was inhabited during several periods in the Neolithic (10,000–4500 BC). In the area of Tell ez-Zor, an artificial hill in the vicinity of the Efqa Spring, traces of human settlement dates as far back as the Prepottery Neolithic A period, with a three-unit architectural complex dating to the Prepottery Neolithic B period. In the Efqa Spring site, a Neolithic settlement existed, with stone tools dated to 7500 BC.

=== Bronze Age ===
Archaeological sounding in the tell beneath the Temple of Bel uncovered a Bronze Age mud-brick structure built around 2500 BC, followed by different Bronze Age and Iron Age structures. The city entered the historical record around 2000 BC, when Puzur-Ishtar the Tadmorean (Palmyrene) agreed to a contract at an Assyrian trading colony in Kultepe. It was mentioned next in the Mari tablets as a stop for trade caravans and nomadic tribes, such as the Suteans, and was conquered along with its region by Yahdun-Lim of Mari. King Shamshi-Adad I of the Kingdom of Upper Mesopotamia passed through the area on his way to the Mediterranean at the beginning of the 18th century BC; by then, Palmyra was the easternmost point of the kingdom of Qatna, and it was attacked by the Suteans who paralyzed the traffic along the trade routes. Palmyra was next mentioned in a 13th-century BC tablet discovered at Emar, which recorded the names of two "Tadmorean" witnesses.

=== Iron Age ===
At the beginning of the 11th century BC, King Tiglath-Pileser I of Assyria recorded his defeat of the "Arameans" of "Tadmar"; according to the king, Palmyra was part of the land of Amurru. The Hebrew Bible (Second Book of Chronicles 8:4) records a city by the name "Tadmor" as a desert city built (or fortified) by King Solomon of Israel; Flavius Josephus mentions the Greek name "Palmyra", attributing its founding to Solomon in Book VIII of his Antiquities of the Jews. Later Arabic traditions attribute the city's founding to Solomon's Jinn. The association of Palmyra with Solomon is a conflation of "Tadmor" and a city built by Solomon in Judea and known as "Tamar" in the Books of Kings (1 Kings 9:18). The biblical description of "Tadmor" and its buildings does not fit archaeological findings in Palmyra, which was a small settlement during Solomon's reign in the 10th century BC.

With the rise of Aramean power in the Levant, the city became the eastern border of Aram-Damascus which was conquered by the Neo-Assyrian Empire in 732 BC. The Elephantine Jews, a diaspora community established between 650 and 550 BC in Egypt, might have come from Palmyra. Papyrus Amherst 63 indicates that the ancestors of the Elephantine Jews were Samarians. The historian Karel van der Toorn suggested that these ancestors took refuge in Judea after the destruction of their kingdom by Sargon II of Assyria in 721 BC, then had to leave Judea after Sennacherib devastated the land in 701 BC and headed to Palmyra. This scenario can explain the usage of Aramaic by the Elephantine Jews, and Papyrus Amherst 63, while not mentioning Palmyra, refers to a "fortress of palms" that is located near a spring on a trade route in the fringes of the desert, making Palmyra a plausible candidate.

=== Hellenistic and Roman periods ===
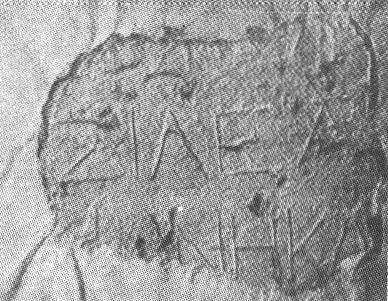
The inscription mentioning king Epiphanes

During the Hellenistic period under the Seleucids (between 312 and 64 BC), Palmyra became a prosperous settlement owing allegiance to the Seleucid king. Evidence for Palmyra's urbanisation in the Hellenistic period is rare; an important piece is the First Aramaic inscription of Laghman found in Laghman, modern Afghanistan, and commissioned by the Indian emperor Ashoka c. 250 BC. The reading is contested, but according to semitologist André Dupont-Sommer, the inscription records the distance to "Tdmr" (Palmyra). (Note: According to the reading of Dupont-Sommer, Palmyra is separated by two hundreds "bows" from Laghman; In the inscription, the word used to indicate bow is "QŠTN", and Dupont-Sommer asserted that it is an Aramaic word denoting a unit to measure a distance of 15 to 20 kilometres. Franz Altheim and Ruth Altheim-Stiehl read three hundred instead of two hundred bows; they equated it with the Vedic unit of measurement yojona, c. 12 kilometres, which would result in a number close to the actual 3800 kilometres distance between Laghman and Palmyra. The linguist Helmut Humbach criticized the reading of Dupont-Sommer and considered his claims regarding the distance to have no validation. In the Aramaic alphabet, the letters "r" and "d" share an identical character; Jean de Menasce read the city's name "Trmd" and identified it with Termez on the Oxus river. The linguist Franz Rosenthal also contested the reading of Dupont-Sommer and considered that the inscription refers to an estate called "Trmn". Historian Bratindra Nath Mukherjee rejected the readings of both Dupont-Sommer and de Menasce; he contested the large value attributed to "bow", considering it a small unit. The historian also rejected the reading of Tdmr and Trmd as referring to a city; in the view of Mukherjee, the name, whether Tdmr or Trmd refers to the rock on which the inscription was carved itself.) In 217 BC, a Palmyrene force led by Zabdibel joined the army of King Antiochus III in the Battle of Raphia which ended in a Seleucid defeat by Ptolemaic Egypt. In the middle of the Hellenistic era, Palmyra, formerly south of the al-Qubur wadi, began to expand beyond its northern bank. By the late second century BC, the tower tombs in the Palmyrene Valley of Tombs and the city temples (most notably, the temples of Baalshamin, Al-lāt and the Hellenistic temple) began to be built. A fragmentary inscription in Greek from the Temple of Bel's foundations mentions a king titled Epiphanes, a title used by the Seleucid kings. (Note: The inscription is in bad shape but the letters' form, especially the four-branched sigma, indicate that it is one of the earliest inscriptions from Palmyra, dating to the beginning of the first century AD or the former first century BC. Seyrig concluded that it is futile to identify the king as the title Epiphanes was borne by many Seleucid kings, the last of them, Antiochus XII, died in 82 BC. Even then, according to Seyrig, the date is too high for the form of the letters. Seyrig suggested a king of Commagene or, more likely, a Parthian king.)

In 64 BC, the Roman Republic conquered the Seleucid kingdom, and the Roman general Pompey established the province of Syria. Palmyra was left independent, trading with Rome and Parthia but belonging to neither. The earliest known inscription in Palmyrene is dated to around 44 BC; Palmyra was still a minor sheikhdom, offering water to caravans which occasionally took the desert route on which it was located. However, according to Appian, Palmyra was wealthy enough for Mark Antony to send a force to conquer it in 41 BC. The Palmyrenes evacuated to Parthian lands beyond the eastern bank of the Euphrates, which they prepared to defend.

==== Autonomous Palmyrene region ====
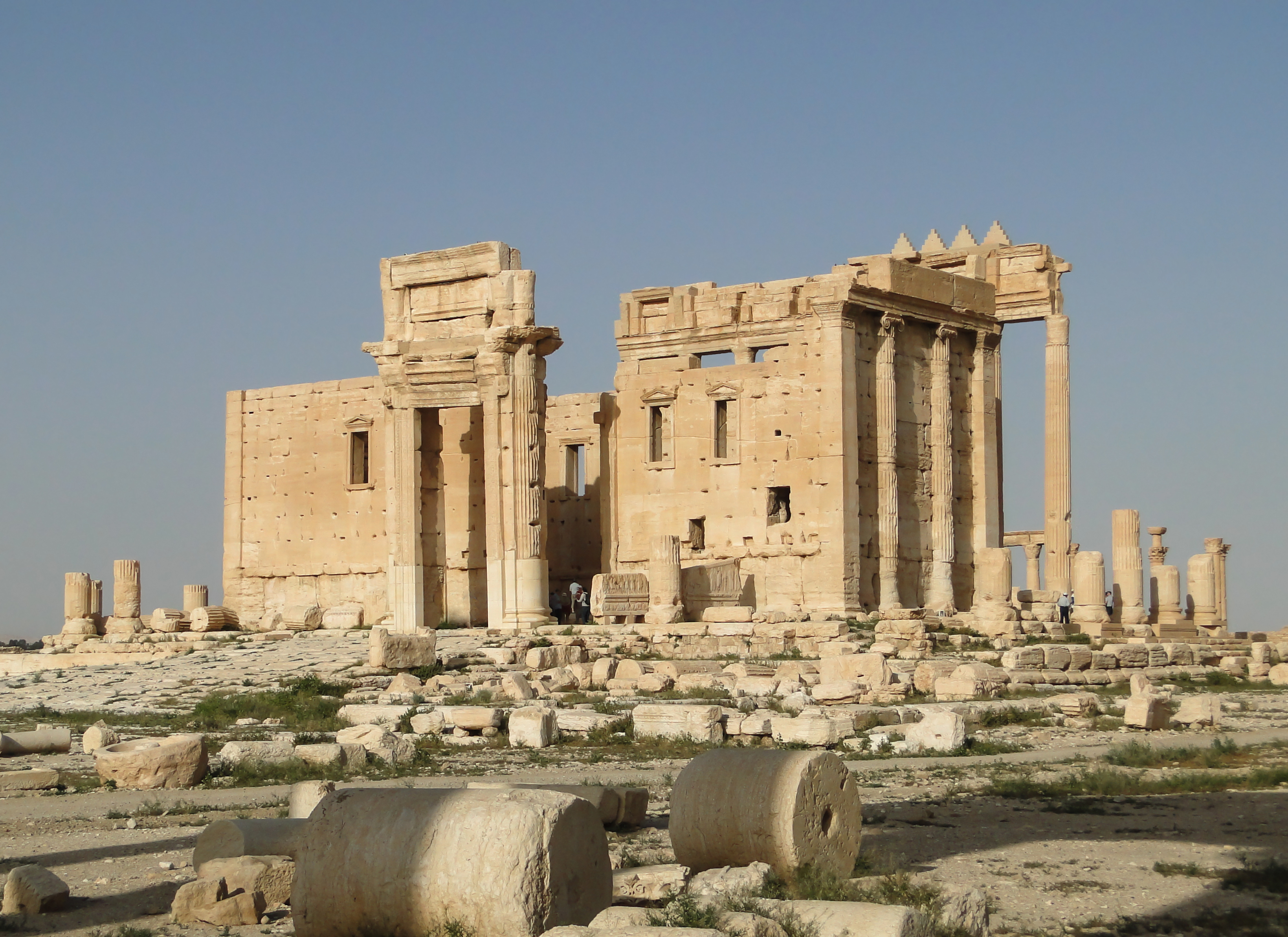
Cella of the Temple of Bel (destroyed in 2015)

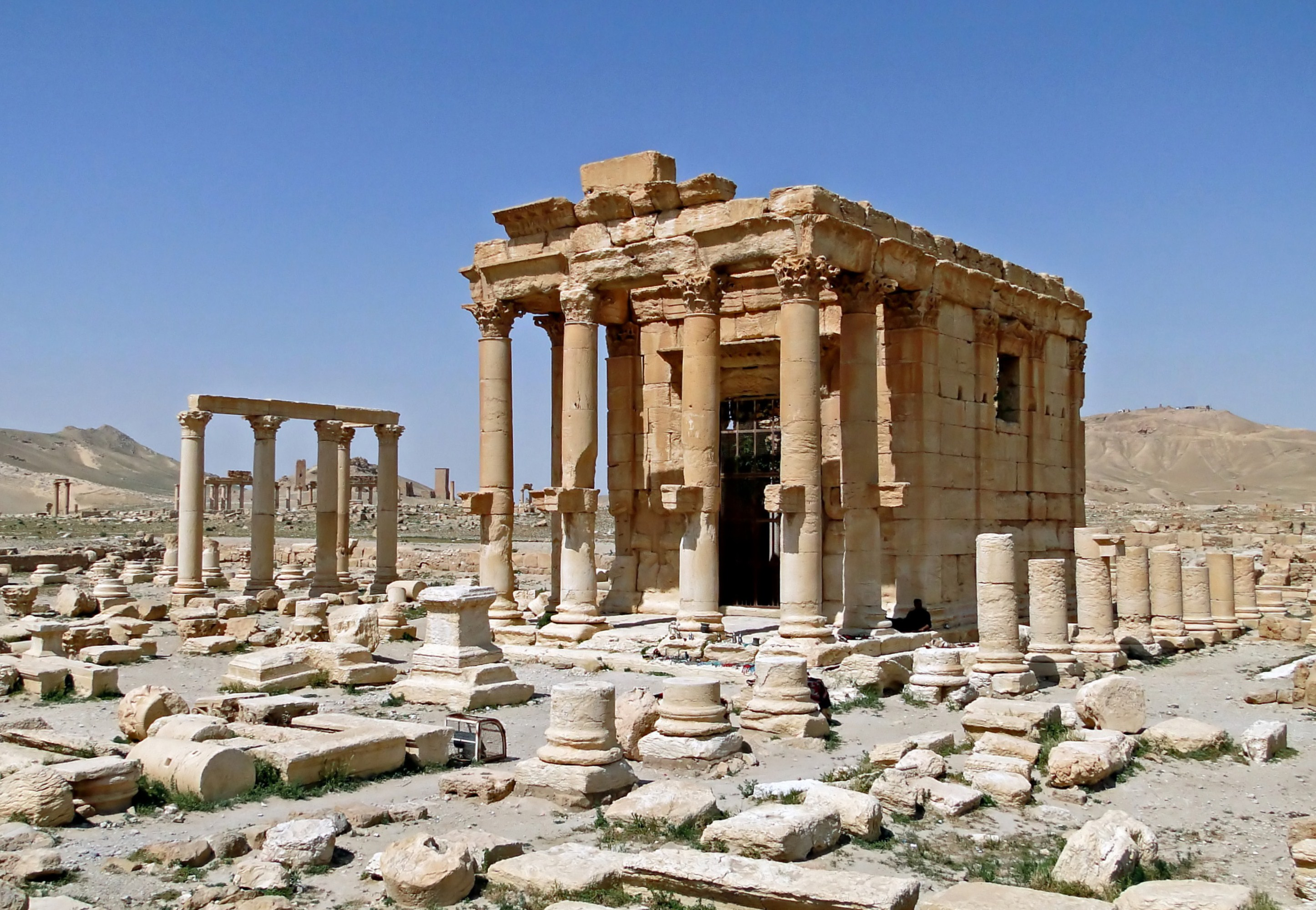
Temple of Baal-Shamin (destroyed in 2015)

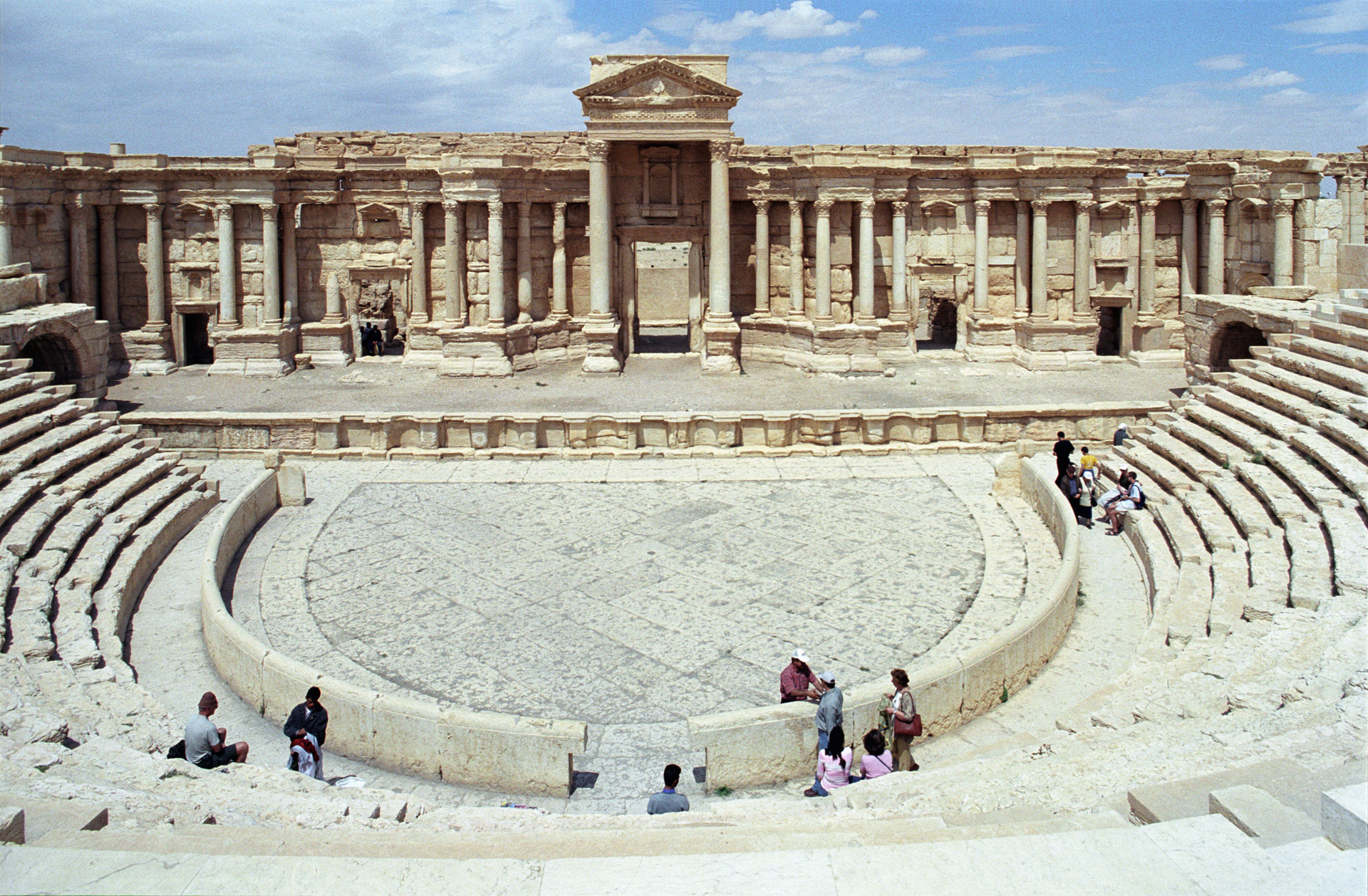
Palmyra's theater (damaged in 2017)

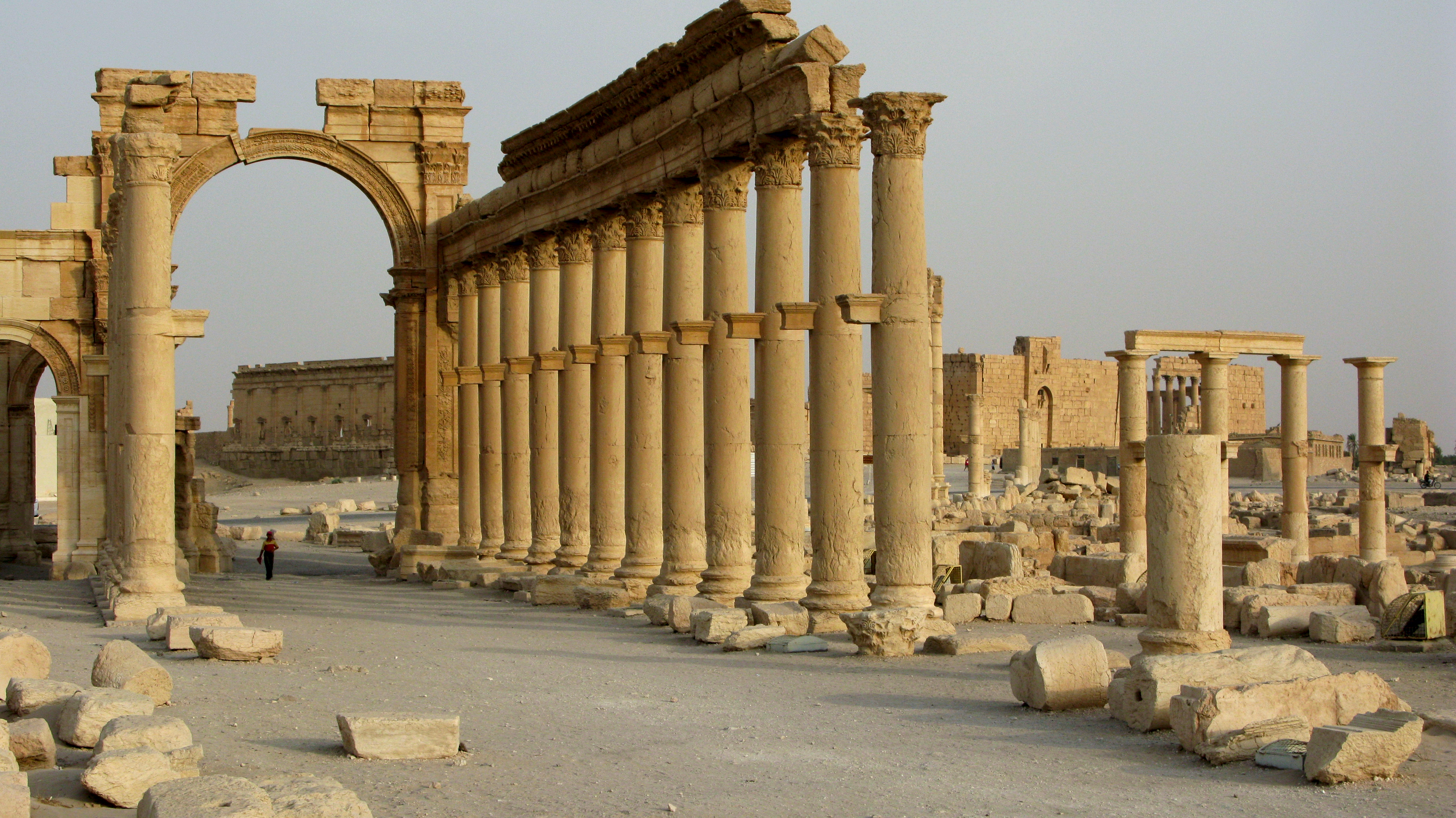
The monumental arch in the eastern section of Palmyra's colonnade (destroyed in 2015)

Palmyra became part of the Roman Empire when it was conquered and paid tribute early in the reign of Tiberius, around 14 AD. (Note: The attribution of Palmyra annexation to Tiberius was supported by Seyrig and became the most influential. However, other dates have been suggested ranging from as early as Pompey's era to as late as Vespasian's reign.) The Romans included Palmyra in the province of Syria, and defined the region's boundaries. Pliny the Elder asserted that both the Palmyrene and Emesene regions were contiguous; a marker at the Palmyrene's southwestern border was found in 1936 by Daniel Schlumberger at Qasr al-Hayr al-Gharbi, dating from the reign of Hadrian or one of his successors, which marked the boundary between the two regions. (Note: Inscription reproduced: Fin[es] inteṛ Hadriano[s] Palmyrenos et [He]ṃesenos) This boundary probably ran northwards to Khirbet al-Bilaas on Jabal al-Bilas where another marker, laid by the Roman governor Silanus, has been found, 75 kilometres (47 mi) northwest of Palmyra, probably marking a boundary with the territory of Epiphania. Meanwhile, Palmyra's eastern border extended to the Euphrates valley. This region included numerous villages subordinate to the center, including large settlements such as al-Qaryatayn. The Roman imperial period brought great prosperity to the city, which enjoyed a privileged status under the empire—retaining much of its internal autonomy, being ruled by a council, and incorporating many Greek city-state (polis) institutions into its government. (Note: The exact year for when Palmyra first made use of some Greek institutions is not known; the evidence that specifically identify Palmyra as a polis is not extensive, and the earliest known reference is an inscription dated to AD 51, written in Palmyrene and Greek, mentioning the "City of the Palmyrenes" in its Greek section.)

The earliest Palmyrene text attesting a Roman presence in the city dates to 18 AD, when the Roman general Germanicus tried to develop a friendly relationship with Parthia; he sent the Palmyrene Alexandros to Mesene, a Parthian vassal kingdom. (Note: Despite his Greek name, Alexandros was probably a native Palmyrene. There is no evidence that Germanicus visited Palmyra.) This was followed by the arrival of the Roman legion Legio X Fretensis the following year. (Note: The legion was part of Germanicus' eastern campaign and was not stationed in the city as a garrison.) Roman authority was minimal during the first century AD, although tax collectors were resident, and a road connecting Palmyra and Sura was built in AD 75. (Note: Commissioned by Traianus.) The Romans used Palmyrene soldiers, but (unlike typical Roman cities) no local magistrates or prefects are recorded in the city. Palmyra saw intensive construction during the first century, including the city's first walled fortifications, and the Temple of Bel (completed and dedicated in 32 AD). During the first century Palmyra developed from a minor desert caravan station into a leading trading center, (Note: The transformation already began in the first century BC.) with Palmyrene merchants establishing colonies in surrounding trade centers.

Palmyrene trade reached its acme during the second century, aided by two factors; the first was a trade route built by Palmyrenes, and protected by garrisons at major locations, including a garrison in Dura-Europos manned in 117 AD. The second was the Roman conquest of the Nabataean capital Petra in 106, shifting control over southern trade routes of the Arabian Peninsula from the Nabataeans to Palmyra. (Note: Although Palmyra benefiting from the annexation of Petra is a mainstream view, Palmyra's trade was mostly with the East, while Petra's trade counted on southern Arabia. In addition to the fact that Palmyra and Petra traded in different articles, hence the annexation of Petra might have not had a real effect on Palmyra's trade.) In 129 Palmyra was visited by Hadrian, who named it "Hadriane Palmyra" and made it a free city. Hadrian promoted Hellenism throughout the empire, and Palmyra's urban expansion was modeled on that of Greece. This led to new projects, including the theatre, the colonnade and the Temple of Nabu. Roman garrisons are first attested in Palmyra in 167, when the cavalry Ala I Thracum Herculiana was moved to the city. (Note: The Ala I Thracum Herculiana was a milliaria. Generally, a milliaria consisted of a thousand horsemen.) By the end of the second century, urban development diminished after the city's building projects peaked.

In the 190s, Palmyra was assigned to the province of Phoenice, newly created by the Severan dynasty. Toward the end of the second century, Palmyra began a steady transition from a traditional Greek city-state to a monarchy due to the increasing militarization of the city and the deteriorating economic situation; the Severan ascension to the imperial throne in Rome played a major role in Palmyra's transition:

- The Severan-led Roman–Parthian War, from 194 to 217, influenced regional security and affected the city's trade. Bandits began attacking caravans by 199, leading Palmyra to strengthen its military presence.
- The new dynasty favored the city, stationing the Cohors I Flavia Chalcidenorum garrison there by 206. Caracalla made Palmyra a colonia between 213 and 216, replacing many Greek institutions with Roman constitutional ones. Severus Alexander, emperor from 222 to 235, visited Palmyra in 229.

==== Palmyrene kingdom ====
The rise of the Sasanian Empire in Persia considerably damaged Palmyrene trade. The Sasanians disbanded Palmyrene colonies in their lands, and began a war against the Roman Empire. In an inscription dated to 252 Odaenathus appears bearing the title of exarchos (lord) of Palmyra. The weakness of the Roman Empire and the constant Persian danger were probably the reasons behind the Palmyrene council's decision to elect a lord for the city in order for him to lead a strengthened army. Odaenathus approached Shapur I of Persia to request him to guarantee Palmyrene interests in Persia, but was rebuffed. In 260 the Emperor Valerian fought Shapur at the Battle of Edessa, but was defeated and captured. One of Valerian's officers, Macrianus Major, his sons Quietus and Macrianus, and the prefect Balista rebelled against Valerian's son Gallienus, usurping imperial power in Syria.

===== Persian wars =====
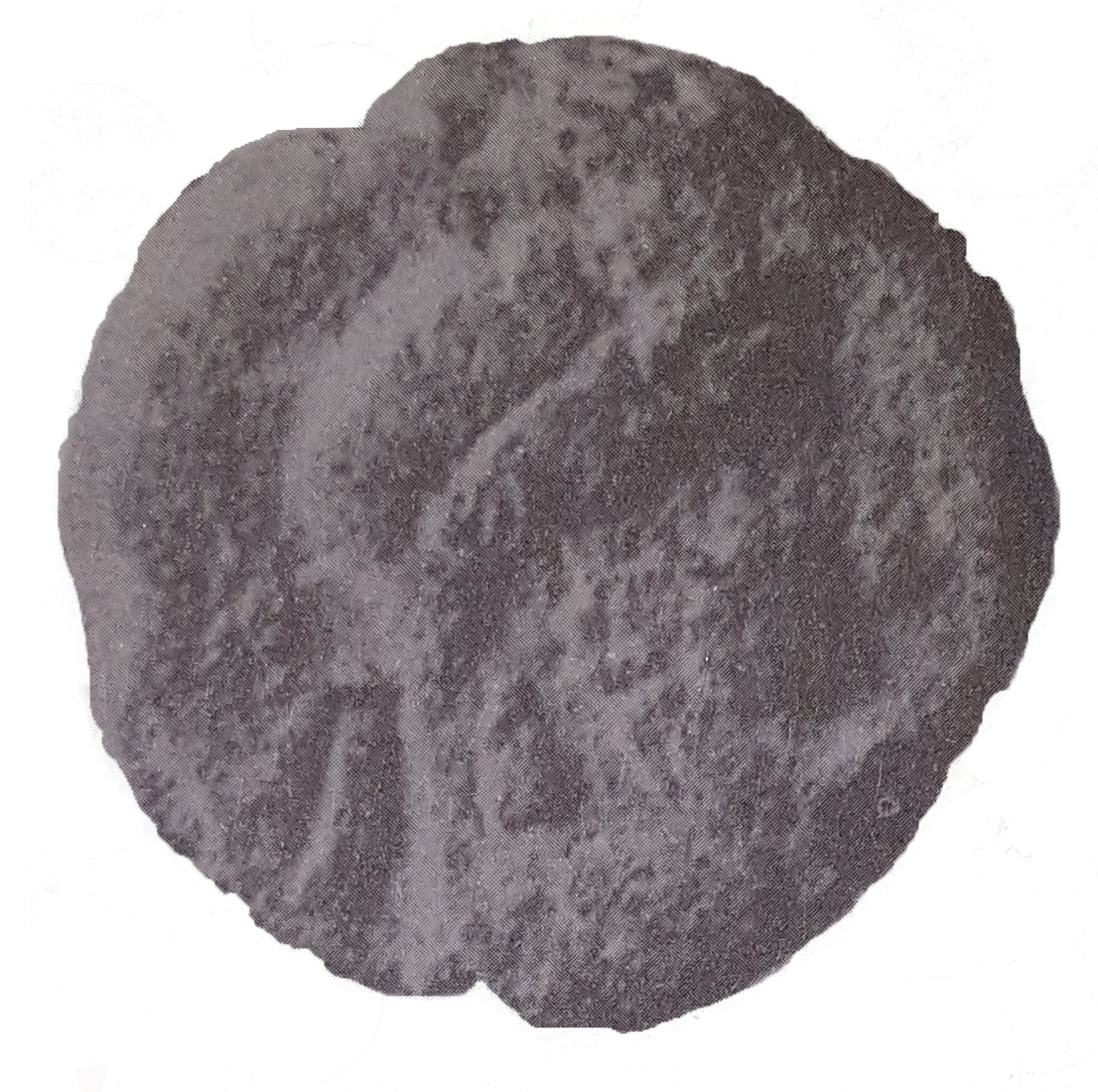
A clay tessera bearing a possible depiction of Odaenathus wearing a diadem

Odaenathus formed an army of Palmyrenes and Syrian peasants against Shapur. (Note: No evidence exist for Roman units serving in the ranks of Odaenathus; whether Roman soldiers fought under Odaenathus or not is a matter of speculation.) According to the Augustan History, Odaenathus declared himself king prior to the battle. The Palmyrene leader won a decisive victory near the banks of the Euphrates later in 260 forcing the Persians to retreat. In 261 Odaenathus marched against the remaining usurpers in Syria, defeating and killing Quietus and Balista. As a reward, he received the title Imperator Totius Orientis ("Governor of the East") from Gallienus, and ruled Syria, Mesopotamia, Arabia and Anatolia's eastern regions as the imperial representative. Palmyra itself remained officially part of the empire but Palmyrene inscriptions started to describe it as a "metrocolonia", indicating that the city's status was higher than normal Roman colonias. In practice, Palmyra shifted from a provincial city to a de facto allied kingdom.

In 262 Odaenathus launched a new campaign against Shapur, reclaiming the rest of Roman Mesopotamia (most importantly, the cities of Nisibis and Carrhae), sacking the Jewish city of Nehardea, (Note: The Mesopotamian Jewish population was regarded by the Palmyrenes as loyal to the Persians.) and besieging the Persian capital Ctesiphon. Following his victory, the Palmyrene monarch assumed the title King of Kings. (Note: The first decisive evidence for the use of this title for Odaenathus is an inscription dated to 271, posthumously describing Odaenathus as "King of Kings". Known inscriptions dating to his reign address him as king. However, Odaenathus' son Hairan I, is directly attested as "King of Kings" during his lifetime. Hairan I was proclaimed by his father as co-ruler and was assassinated during the same assassination incident that took the life of Odaenathus and it is unlikely that Odaenathus was simply a king while his son held the King of Kings title.) Later, Odaenathus crowned his son Hairan I as co-King of Kings near Antioch in 263. Although he did not take the Persian capital, Odaenathus drove the Persians out of all Roman lands conquered since the beginning of Shapur's wars in 252. In a second campaign that took place in 266, the Palmyrene king reached Ctesiphon again; however, he had to leave the siege and move north, accompanied by Hairan I, to repel Gothic attacks on Asia Minor. The king and his son were assassinated during their return in 267; according to the Augustan History and Joannes Zonaras, Odaenathus was killed by a cousin (Zonaras says nephew) named in the History as Maeonius. The Augustan History also says that Maeonius was proclaimed emperor for a brief period before being killed by the soldiers. However, no inscriptions or other evidence exist for Maeonius' reign.

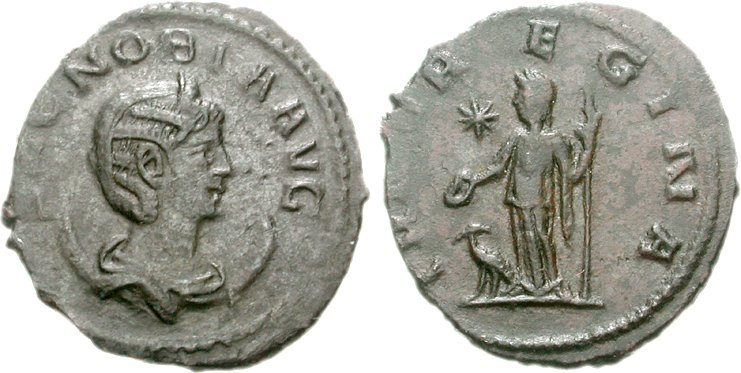
Zenobia as Augusta, on the obverse of an Antoninianus.

Odaenathus was succeeded by his son; the ten-year-old Vaballathus. Zenobia, the mother of the new king, was the de facto ruler and Vaballathus remained in her shadow while she consolidated her power. Gallienus dispatched his prefect Heraclian to command military operations against the Persians, but he was marginalized by Zenobia and returned to the West. The queen was careful not to provoke Rome, claiming for herself and her son the titles held by her husband while guaranteeing the safety of the borders with Persia and pacifying the Tanukhids in Hauran. To protect the borders with Persia, Zenobia fortified different settlements on the Euphrates including the citadels of Halabiye and Zalabiye. Circumstantial evidence exist for confrontations with the Sasanians; probably in 269 Vaballathus took the title Persicus Maximus ("The great victor in Persia") and the title might be linked with an unrecorded battle against a Persian army trying to regain control of Northern Mesopotamia.

===== Palmyrene empire =====
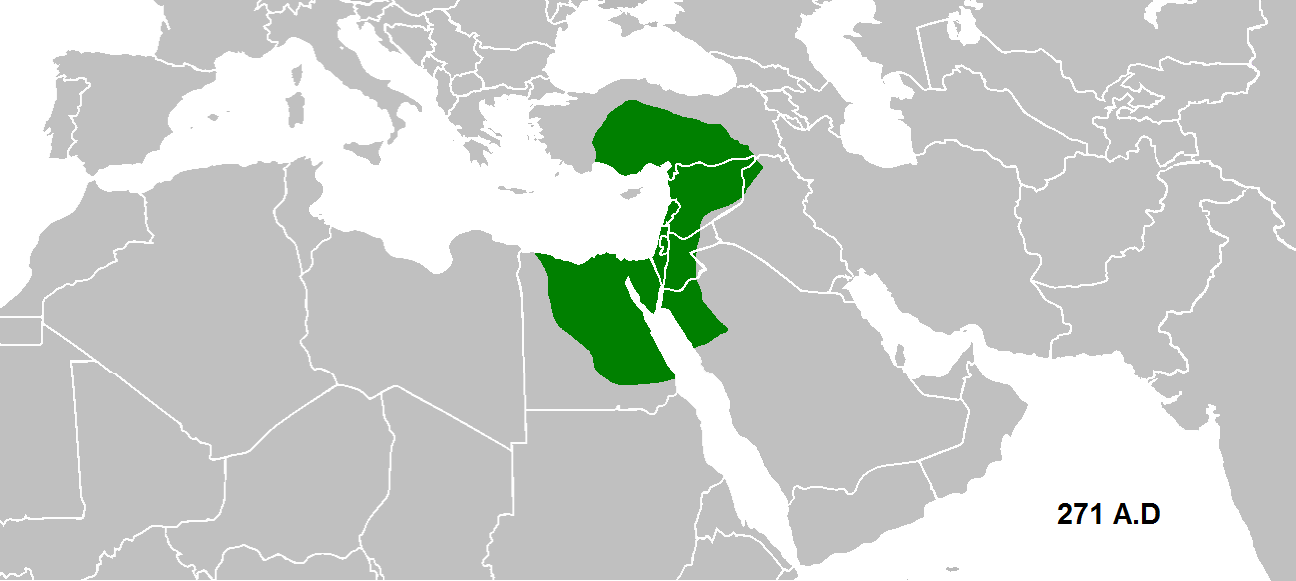
The Palmyrene empire in AD 271

Zenobia began her military career in the spring of 270, during the reign of Claudius Gothicus. Under the pretext of attacking the Tanukhids, she conquered Roman Arabia. This was followed in October by an invasion of Egypt, ending with a Palmyrene victory and Zenobia's proclamation as queen of Egypt. Palmyra invaded Anatolia the following year, reaching Ankara and the pinnacle of its expansion. The conquests were made behind a mask of subordination to Rome. Zenobia issued coins in the name of Claudius' successor Aurelian, with Vaballathus depicted as king; (Note: Claudius died in August 270, shortly before Zenobia's invasion of Egypt.) since Aurelian was occupied with repelling insurgencies in Europe, he tolerated the Palmyrene coinage and encroachments. In late 271, Vaballathus and his mother assumed the titles of Augustus (emperor) and Augusta. (Note: Scholarly opinion is divided as to whether this was a declaration of independence or a usurpation of the Roman throne.)

The following year, Aurelian crossed the Bosphorus and advanced quickly through Anatolia. According to one account, Roman general Marcus Aurelius Probus regained Egypt from Palmyra; (Note: All other accounts indicate that a military action was not necessary, as it seems that Zenobia withdrew her forces in order to defend Syria.) Aurelian entered Issus and headed to Antioch, where he defeated Zenobia in the Battle of Immae. Zenobia was defeated again at the Battle of Emesa, taking refuge in Homs before quickly returning to her capital. When the Romans besieged Palmyra, Zenobia refused their order to surrender in person to the emperor. She escaped east to ask the Persians for help, but was captured by the Romans; the city capitulated soon afterwards.

==== Later Roman and Byzantine periods ====
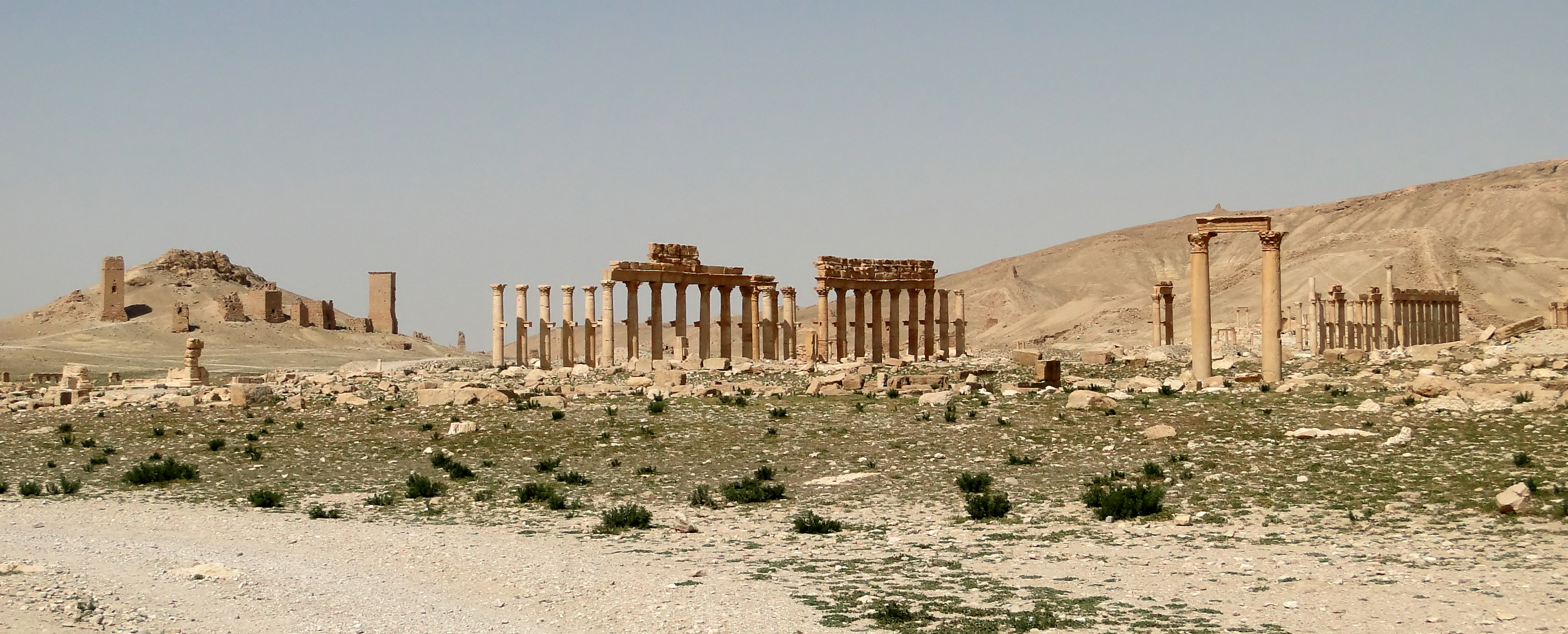
Diocletian's camp

Aurelian spared the city and stationed a garrison of 600 archers, led by Sandarion, as a peacekeeping force. In 273 Palmyra rebelled under the leadership of Septimius Apsaios, declaring Antiochus (a relative of Zenobia) as Augustus. Aurelian marched against Palmyra, razing it to the ground and seizing the most valuable monuments to decorate his Temple of Sol. Palmyrene buildings were smashed, residents massacred and the Temple of Bel pillaged.

Palmyra was significantly reduced and it largely disappeared from historical records of that period. After its sacking, Aurelian repaired the Temple of Bel, and the Legio I Illyricorum was stationed in the city. Shortly before 303 the Camp of Diocletian, a castrum in the western part of the city, was built. The 4-hectare (9.9-acre) camp was a base for the Legio I Illyricorum, which guarded the trade routes around the city. Though some of the city would not be rebuilt, Palmyra would become a major stronghold and fortress in the East. Thanks in part to this, in the following years Palmyra began to regain importance, becoming a Christian city in the decades following its destruction by Aurelian. In late 527, Justinian I further strengthened the city, ordering the restoration of Palmyra's churches and public buildings to protect the empire against raids by Lakhmid king Al-Mundhir III ibn al-Nu'man.

=== Arab caliphates ===
Palmyra was conquered by the Rashidun Caliphate after its 634 capture by the Muslim general Khalid ibn al-Walid, who took the city on his way to Damascus; an 18-day march by his army through the Syrian Desert from Mesopotamia. By then Palmyra was limited to the Diocletian camp. After the conquest, the city became part of Homs Province.

==== Umayyad and early Abbasid periods ====
Palmyra prospered as part of the Umayyad Caliphate, and its population grew. It was a key stop on the East-West trade route, with a large souq (market), built by the Umayyads, who also commissioned part of the Temple of Bel as a jama masjid (congregational mosque). During this period, Palmyra was a stronghold of the Banu Kalb tribe, which began to take abode in and around the city after the conquest. After being defeated by Marwan II during a civil war in the caliphate, Umayyad contender Sulayman ibn Hisham fled to the Banu Kalb in Palmyra, but eventually pledged allegiance to Marwan in 744; Palmyra continued to oppose Marwan until the surrender of the Banu Kalb chief al-Asbagh ibn Dhu'ala in 745. That year, Marwan ordered the city's walls demolished.

In 750 a revolt, led by Majza'a ibn al-Kawthar and Umayyad pretender Abu Muhammad al-Sufyani, against the new Abbasid Caliphate swept across Syria; the tribes in Palmyra supported the rebels. After his defeat Abu Muhammad took refuge in the city, which withstood an Abbasid assault long enough to allow him to escape.

==== Decentralization ====
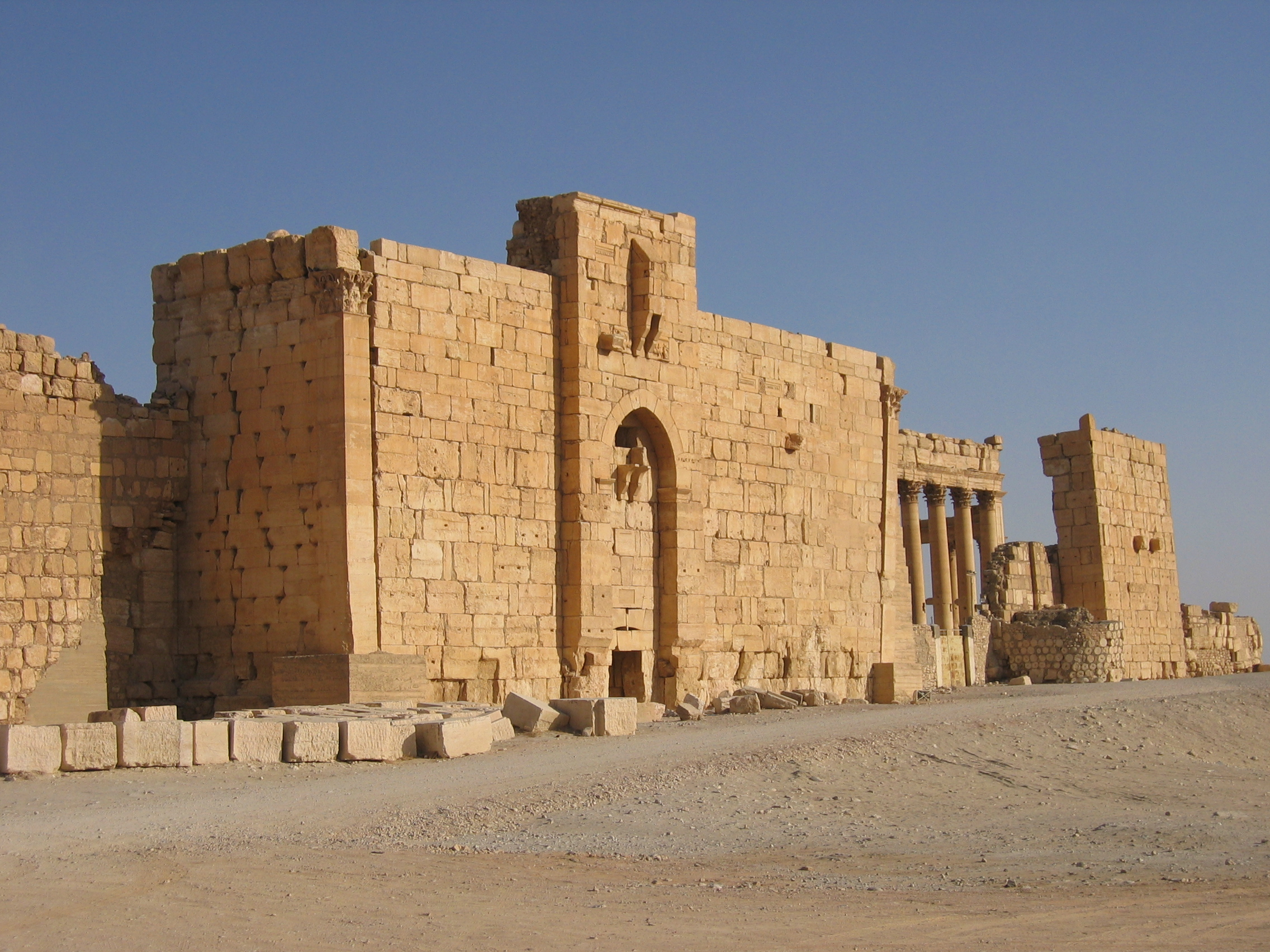
Fortifications at the Temple of Bel

Abbasid power dwindled during the 10th century, when the empire disintegrated and was divided among a number of vassals. Most of the new rulers acknowledged the caliph as their nominal sovereign, a situation which continued until the Mongol destruction of the Abbasid Caliphate in 1258.

The population of the city began to decline in the ninth century, a process that continued throughout the tenth century, by the end of which the inhabitants occupied only the enclosed area of the Temple of Bel. In 955 Sayf al-Dawla, the Hamdanid prince of Aleppo, defeated the nomads near the city, and built a kasbah (fortress) in response to campaigns by the Byzantine emperors Nikephoros II Phokas and John I Tzimiskes. With the advent of Fatimid rule in the late 10th century, Palmyra remained a stronghold of the Kalb and taxes on the oasis' crops was a major source of the tribe's income. Toward the end of the century, the Kalb around Palmyra migrated from the area. Earthquakes devastated Palmyra in 1068 and 1089. In the 1070s Syria was conquered by the Seljuk Empire, and in 1082, the district of Homs came under the control of the Arab lord Khalaf ibn Mula'ib. The latter was a brigand and was removed and imprisoned in 1090 by the Seljuq sultan Malik-Shah I. Khalaf's lands were given to Malik-Shah's brother, Tutush I, who gained his independence after his brother's 1092 death and established a cadet branch of the Seljuk dynasty in Syria.

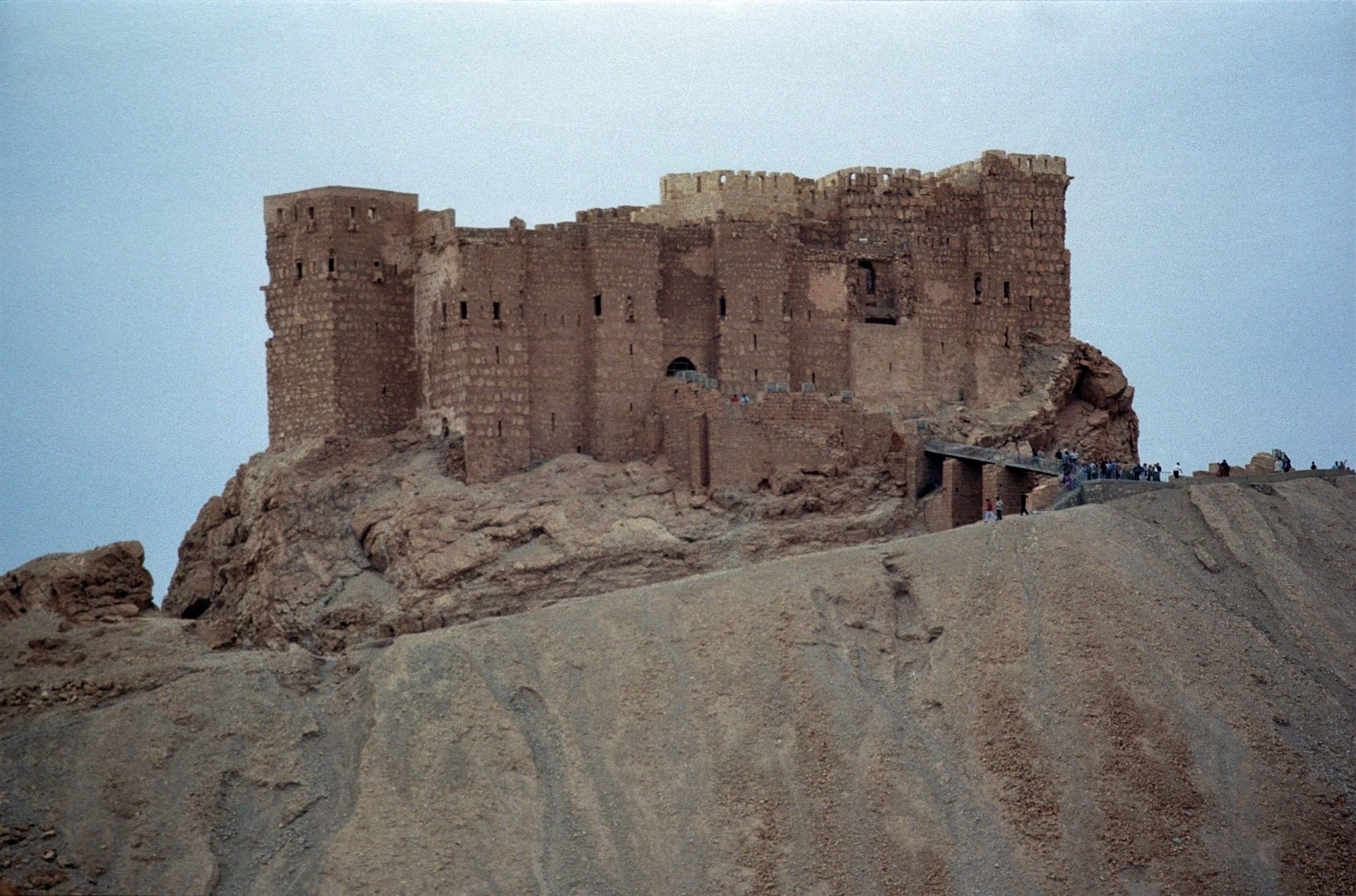
Fakhr-al-Din al-Maani Castle

In the twelfth century, Palmyra was ruled by Toghtekin, the Burid atabeg of Damascus, who appointed his nephew governor. Toghtekin's nephew was killed by rebels, and the atabeg retook the city in 1126. Palmyra was given to Toghtekin's grandson, Shihab-ud-din Mahmud, who was replaced by governor Yusuf ibn Firuz when Shihab-ud-din Mahmud returned to Damascus after his father Taj al-Muluk Buri succeeded Toghtekin. The Burids transformed the Temple of Bel into a citadel in 1132, fortifying the city, and transferring it to the Bin Qaraja family three years later in exchange for Homs.

During the mid-twelfth century, Palmyra was ruled by the Zengid king Nur ad-Din Mahmud. It became part of the district of Homs, which was given as a fiefdom to the Ayyubid general Shirkuh in 1168 and confiscated after his death in 1169. Homs region was conquered by the Ayyubid sultanate in 1174; the following year, Saladin gave Homs (including Palmyra) to his cousin Nasir al-Din Muhammad as a fiefdom. After Saladin's death, the Ayyubid realm was divided and Palmyra was given to Nasir al-Din Muhammad's son Al-Mujahid Shirkuh II (who built the castle of Palmyra known as Fakhr-al-Din al-Maani Castle around 1230). Five years earlier, Syrian geographer Yaqut al-Hamawi described Palmyra's residents as living in "a castle surrounded by a stone wall".

=== Mamluk period ===
Palmyra was used as a refuge by Shirkuh II's grandson, al-Ashraf Musa, who allied himself with the Mongol king Hulagu Khan and fled after the Mongol defeat in the 1260 Battle of Ain Jalut against the Mamluks. Al-Ashraf Musa asked the Mamluk sultan Qutuz for pardon and was accepted as a vassal. Al-Ashraf Musa died in 1263 without an heir, bringing the Homs district under direct Mamluk rule.

==== Al Fadl principality ====
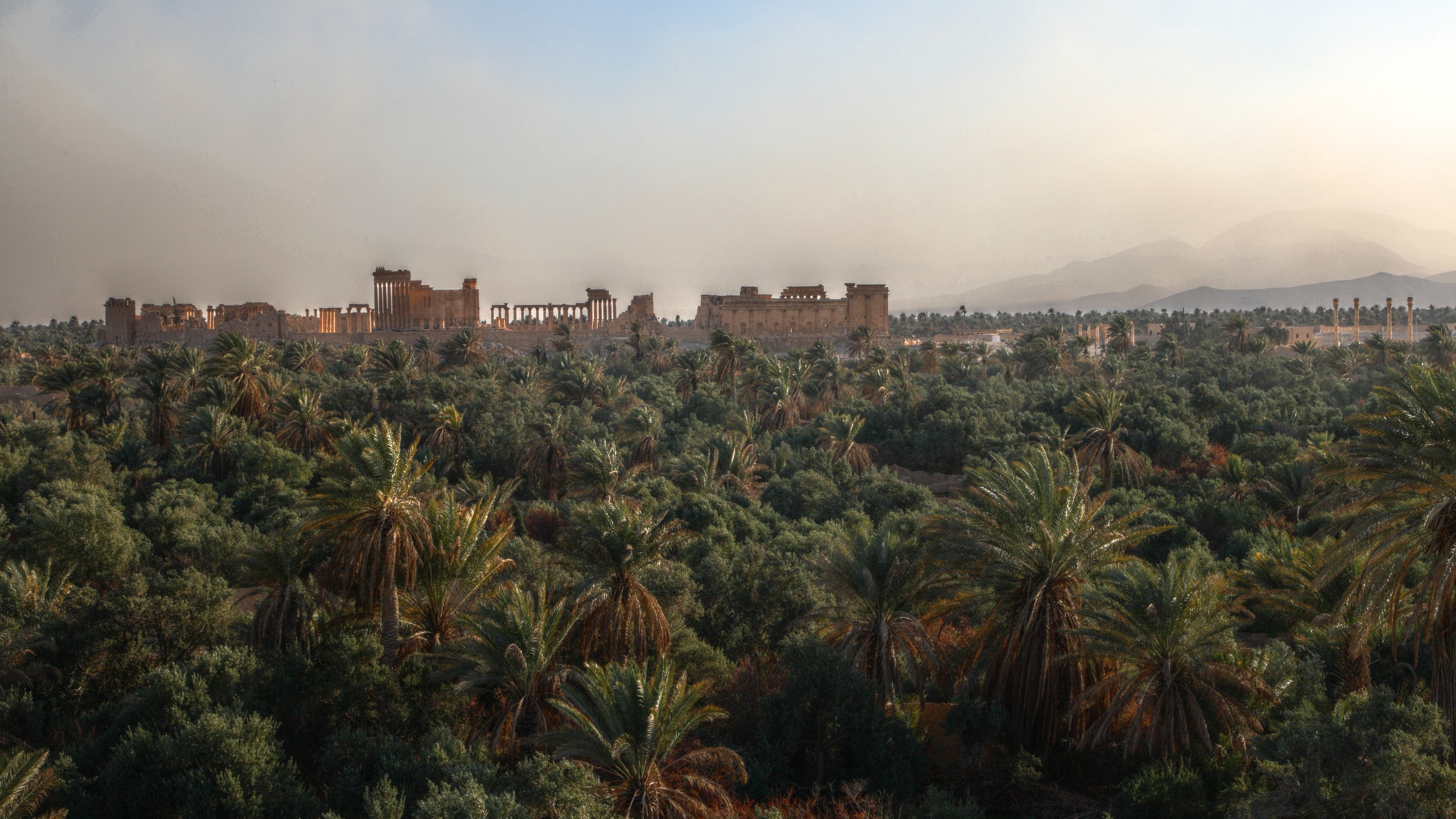
Palmyra's gardens

The Al Fadl clan (a branch of the Tayy tribe) were loyal to the Mamluks, and in 1281, Prince Issa bin Muhanna of the Al Fadl was appointed lord of Palmyra by sultan Qalawun. Issa was succeeded in 1284 by his son Muhanna bin Issa who was imprisoned by sultan al-Ashraf Khalil in 1293, and restored two years later by sultan al-Adil Kitbugha. Muhanna declared his loyalty to Öljaitü of the Ilkhanate in 1312 and was dismissed and replaced with his brother Fadl by sultan an-Nasir Muhammad. Although Muhanna was forgiven by an-Nasir and restored in 1317, he and his tribe were expelled in 1320 for his continued relations with the Ilkhanate, and he was replaced by tribal chief Muhammad ibn Abi Bakr.

Muhanna was forgiven and restored by an-Nasir in 1330; he remained loyal to the sultan until his death in 1335, when he was succeeded by his son. Contemporary historian Ibn Fadlallah al-Omari described the city as having "vast gardens, flourishing trades and bizarre monuments". The Al Fadl clan protected the trade routes and villages from Bedouin raids, raiding other cities and fighting among themselves. The Mamluks intervened militarily several times, dismissing, imprisoning or expelling its leaders. In 1400 Palmyra was attacked by Timur; the Fadl prince Nu'air escaped the battle and later fought Jakam, the sultan of Aleppo. Nu'air was captured, taken to Aleppo and executed in 1406; this, according to Ibn Hajar al-Asqalani, ended the Al Fadl clan's power.

=== Ottoman era ===
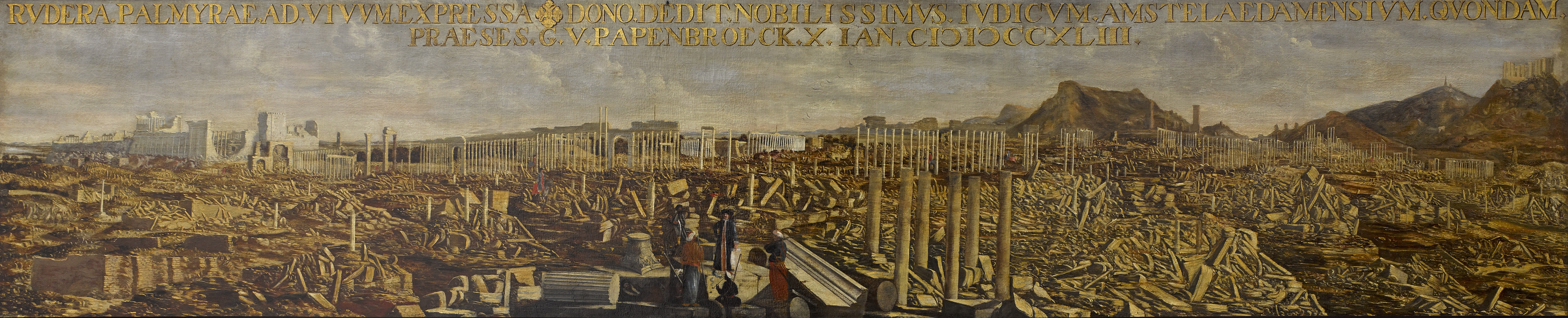
Gerard Hofsted van Essen's painting of the ruins, following his participation in the 1691 Levant Company expedition, the first Western expedition to the site. This is the earliest Western depiction of Palmyra. A group stands in the center foreground around a large stone, on which the date 1693 is shown. The gold text at the top explains the 1743 donation of the picture as part of the Papenbroek Collection. Scroll left and right to view the full panorama.

While most of Syria came under Ottoman rule in 1516, Palmyra (Tadmur) does not appear to have been incorporated into the Empire before the conquest of Iraq in 1534–1535. It first appears as the centre of an administrative district (sanjak) around 1560. (Note: Named in Ottoman system "Salyane Sanjak", which is a Sanjak that had an annual allowance from the government, in contrast to the Khas Sanjaks, which yielded a land revenue.) The region was important to the Ottomans above all for its salt deposits. In 1568, the governor of the sancak restored the medieval citadel. After 1568 the Ottomans appointed the Lebanese emir Ali bin Musa Harfush as governor of Palmyra's sanjak, dismissing him in 1584 for insubordination. In 1630 Palmyra came under the tax authority of another Lebanese emir, Fakhr-al-Din II, who renovated Shirkuh II's castle (which became known as Fakhr-al-Din al-Maani Castle). The prince fell from grace with the Ottomans in 1633 and lost control of the village, which remained a separate sanjak until it was absorbed by Zor Sanjak in 1857. The Ottoman governor of Syria, Mehmed Rashid Pasha, established a garrison in the village to control the Bedouin in 1867.

=== 20th century ===
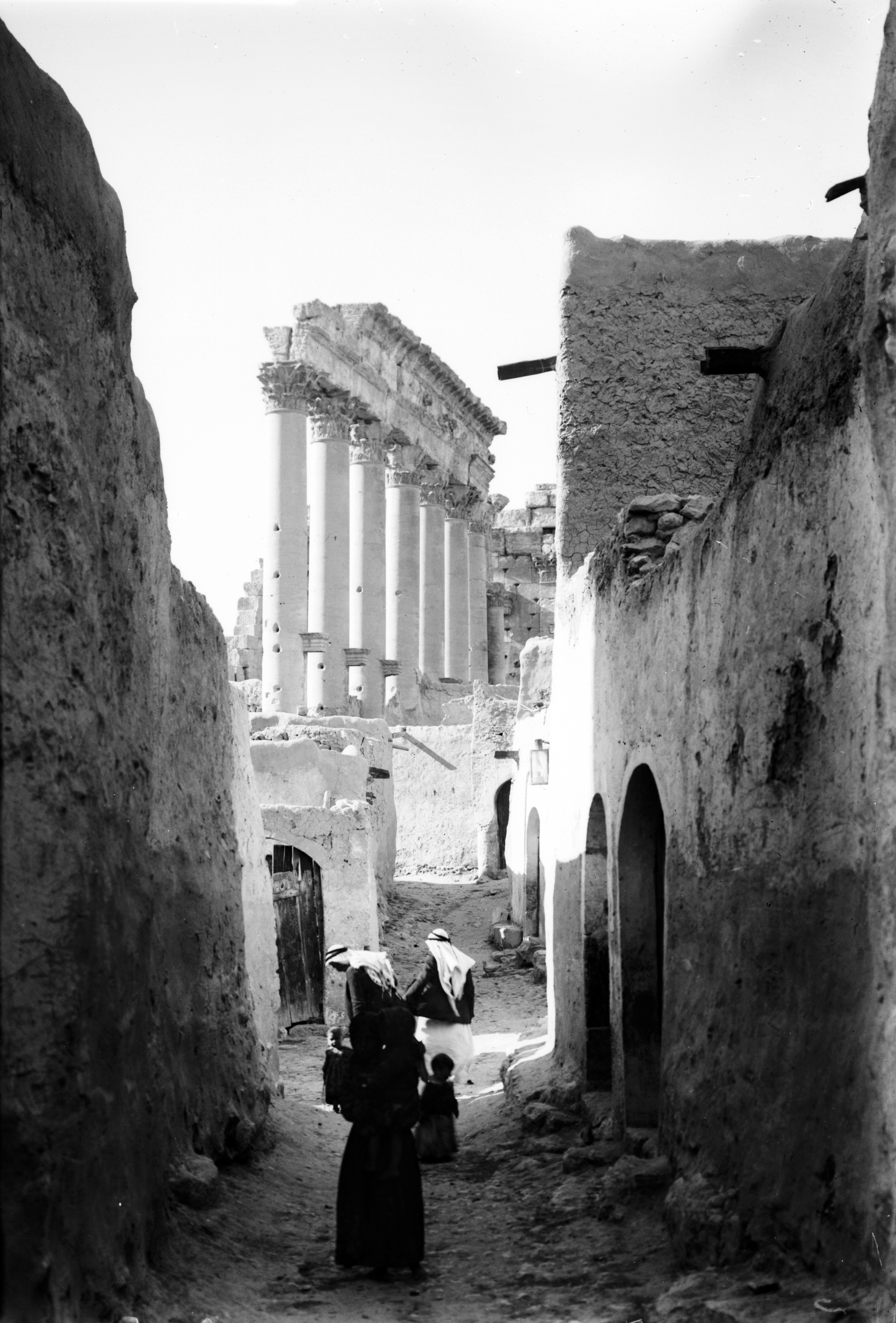
The village, within the Temple of Bel, during the early 20th century

In 1918, as World War I was ending, the Royal Air Force built an airfield for two planes, (Note: The British did not occupy the area and the local Bedouins agreed to protect the field.) and in November the Ottomans retreated from Zor Sanjak without a fight. (Note: Neither the British, French or Arab armies attacked the Sanjak.) The Syrian Emirate's army entered Deir ez-Zor on 4 December, and Zor Sanjak became part of Syria. In 1919, as the British and French argued over the borders of the planned mandates, the British permanent military representative to the Supreme War Council Henry Wilson suggested adding Palmyra to the British mandate. However, the British general Edmund Allenby persuaded his government to abandon this plan. Syria (including Palmyra) became part of the French Mandate after Syria's defeat in the Battle of Maysalun on 24 July 1920.

With Palmyra gaining importance in the French efforts to pacify the Syrian Desert, a base was constructed in the village near the Temple of Bel in 1921. In 1929, Henri Seyrig, began excavating the ruins and convinced the villagers to move to a new, French-built village next to the site. The relocation was completed in 1932; ancient Palmyra was ready for excavation as its villagers settled into the new village of Tadmur. During World War II, the Mandate came under the authority of Vichy France, who gave permission to Nazi Germany to use the airfield at Palmyra; forces of Free France, backed by British forces, invaded Syria in June 1941, and on 3 July 1941, the British took control over the city in the aftermath of a battle.

=== Syrian civil war ===
Destructions in Palmyra
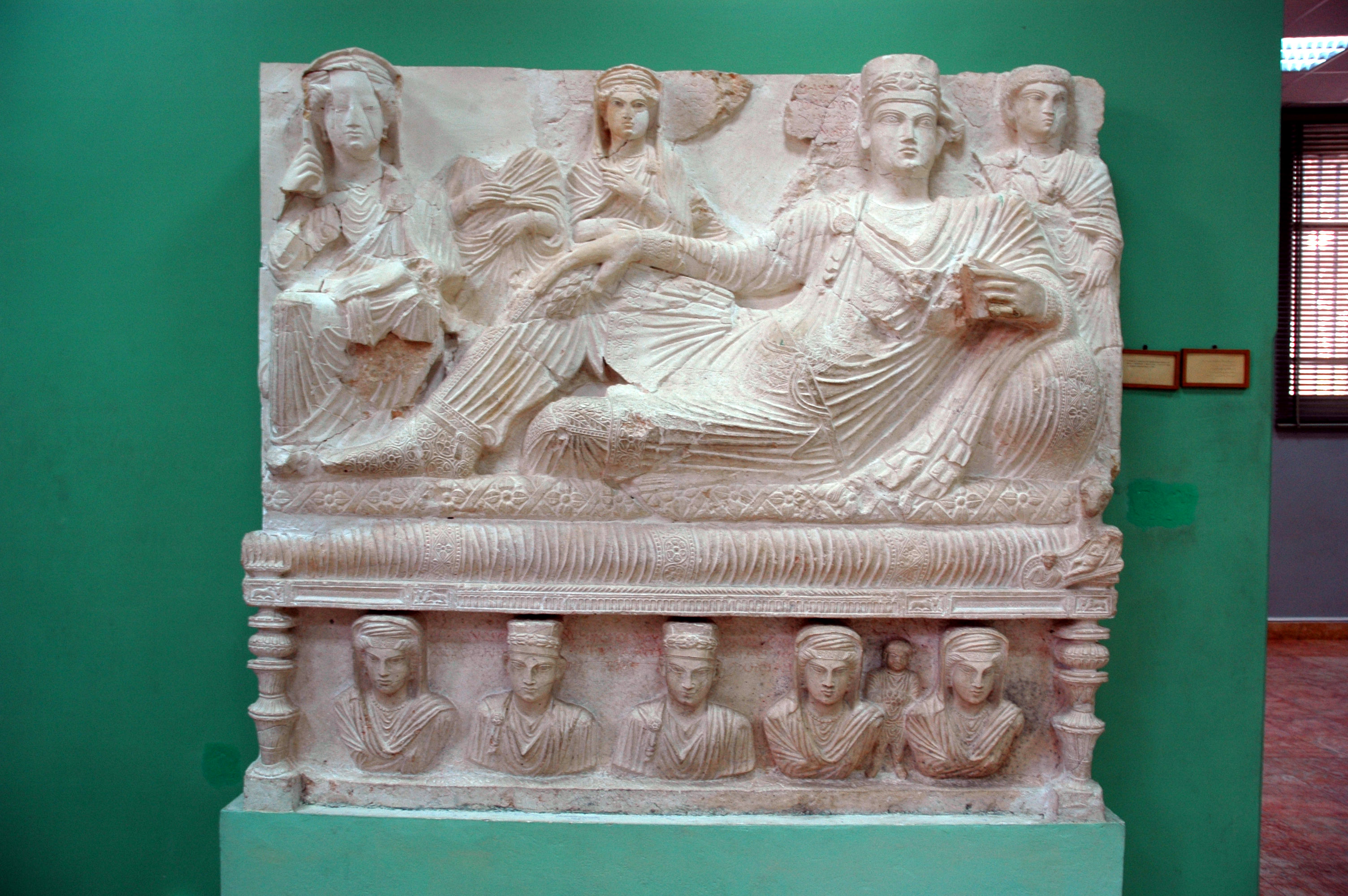
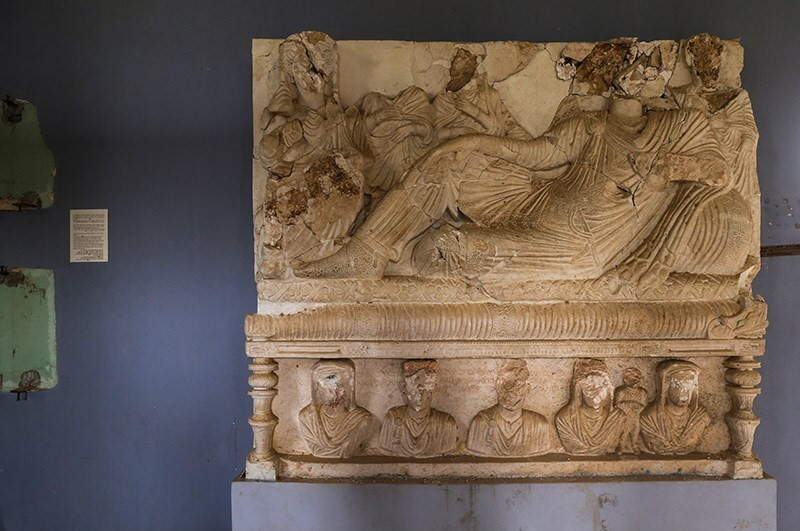
Sculpture in the Palmyra Museum, before and after the conflict.

During the war the Syrian Army positioned its troops within the archaeological site. On 13 May 2015, IS launched an attack on the modern town of Tadmur, sparking fears that the iconoclastic group would destroy the adjacent ancient site of Palmyra. The Syrian Directorate-General of Antiquities and Museums removed more than 400 statues and hundreds of artifacts from the museum and several safe locations, transporting them to Damascus for safekeeping. A number of Greco-Roman busts, jewelry, and other objects looted from the museum have been later found on the international market. IS' forces entered Palmyra on 21 May in a sudden takeover, which abruptly ended the Directorate-General's efforts to evacuate the remaining artifacts consisting of large statues and pieces.

During IS' first occupation of the site, Palmyra's theatre was used as a place of public executions of their opponents and captives; videos were released by ISIL showing the killing of Syrian prisoners in front of crowds at the theatre. On 18 August, Palmyra's retired antiquities chief Khaled al-Asaad was beheaded by ISIL after being tortured for a month to extract information about the city and its treasures; al-Asaad refused to give any information to his captors.

The Syrian Army supported by Russian airstrikes recaptured Palmyra on 27 March 2016. According to initial reports, the damage to the archaeological site was less extensive than anticipated, with numerous structures still standing. Russian de-mining teams began clearing mines planted by IS prior to their retreat. Following heavy fighting, IS briefly reoccupied the city on 11 December 2016, prompting an offensive by the Syrian Army which retook the city on 2 March 2017. On 7 December 2024, Palmyra was captured by the Syrian Free Army, a day before the fall of the Assad regime. The Syrian transitional government stationed guards as to protect the area from further damage.

== Government ==
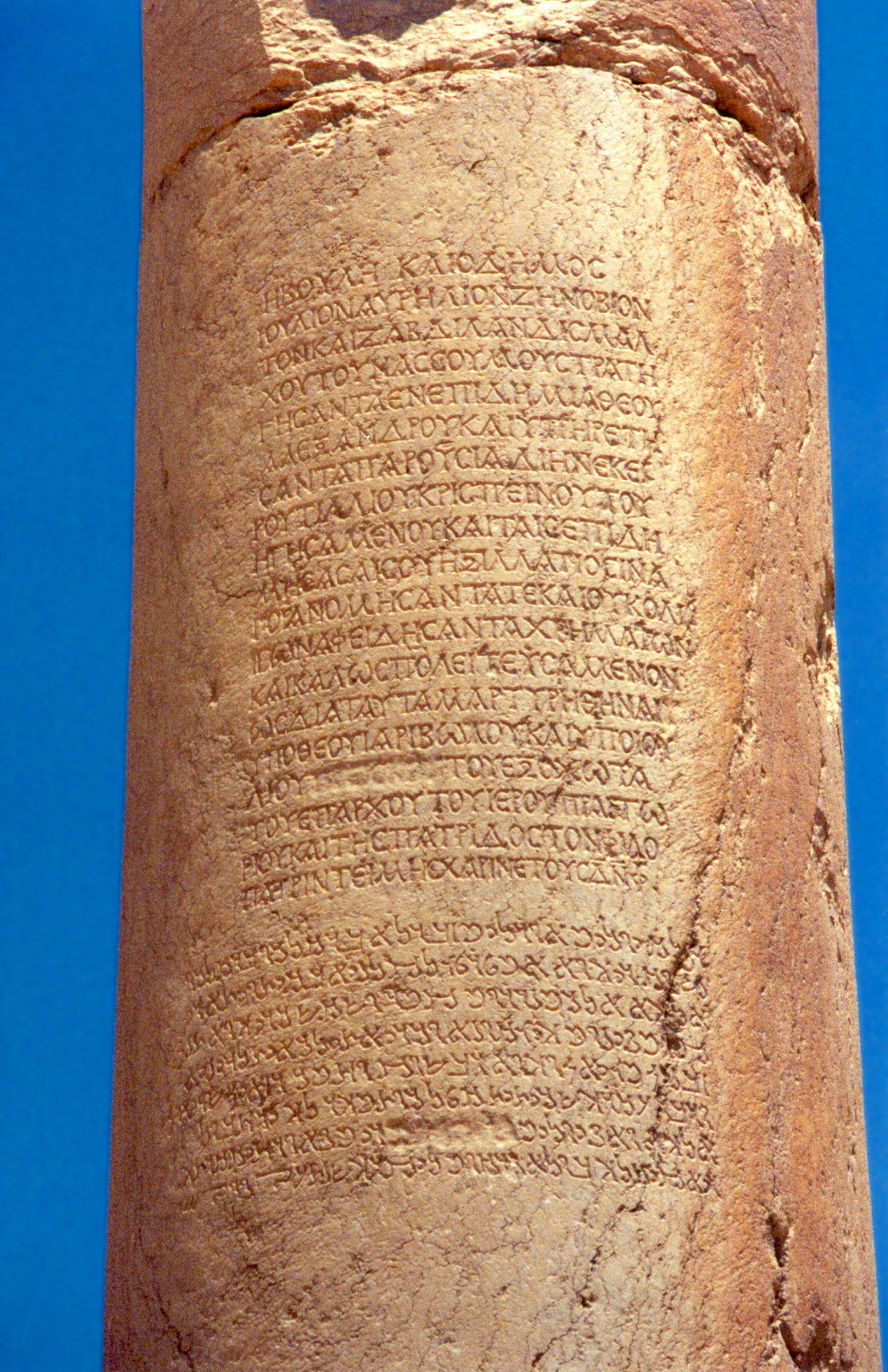
Palmyrene inscription (CIS II 3932) and Greek inscription honoring the strategos Zabdilas, whose Roman name was Julius Aurelius Zenobius, dated 242–243 AD.

From the beginning of its history to the first century AD Palmyra was a petty sheikhdom, and by the first century BC a Palmyrene identity began to develop. During the first half of the first century AD, Palmyra incorporated some of the institutions of a Greek city (polis); the notion of an existing citizenship first appears in an inscription, dated to AD 10, mentioning the "people of Palmyra". In AD 74, an inscription mentions the city's boule (senate). The tribal role in Palmyra is debated; during the first century, four treasurers representing the four tribes seems to have partially controlled the administration but their role became ceremonial by the second century and power rested in the hands of the council.

The Palmyrene council consisted of about six hundred members of the local elite (such as the elders or heads of wealthy families or clans), (Note: The number of 600 is hypothetical.) representing the city's four-quarters. The council, headed by a president, managed civic responsibilities; it supervised public works (including the construction of public buildings), approved expenditures, collected taxes, and appointed two archons (lords) each year. Palmyra's military was led by strategoi (generals) appointed by the council. Roman provincial authority set and approved Palmyra's tariff structure, but the provincial interference in local government was kept minimal as the empire sought to ensure the continuous success of Palmyrene trade most beneficial to Rome. An imposition of direct provincial administration would have jeopardized Palmyra's ability to conduct its trading activities in the East, especially in Parthia.

With the elevation of Palmyra to a colonia around 213–216, the city ceased being subject to Roman provincial governors and taxes. Palmyra incorporated Roman institutions into its system while keeping many of its former ones. The council remained, and the strategos designated one of two annually-elected magistrates. This duumviri implemented the new colonial constitution, replacing the archons. Palmyra's political scene changed with the rise of Odaenathus and his family; an inscription dated to 251 describes Odaenathus' son Hairan I as "Ras" (lord) of Palmyra (exarch in the Greek section of the inscription) and another inscription dated to 252 describes Odaenathus with the same title. (Note: Hairan I was described as "Ras" in 251 indicating that Odaenathus was promoted at that time as well.) Odaenathus was probably elected by the council as exarch, which was an unusual title in the Roman empire and was not part of the traditional Palmyrene governance institutions. Whether Odaenathus' title indicated a military or a priestly position is unknown, but the military role is more likely. By 257 Odaenathus was known as a consularis, possibly the legatus of the province of Phoenice. In 258 Odaenathus began extending his political influence, taking advantage of regional instability caused by Sasanian aggression; this culminated in the Battle of Edessa, Odaenathus' royal elevation and mobilization of troops, which made Palmyra a kingdom.

The monarchy continued most civic institutions, but the duumviri and the council were no longer attested after 264; Odaenathus appointed a governor for the city. In the absence of the monarch, the city was administered by a viceroy. Although governors of the eastern Roman provinces under Odaenathus' control were still appointed by Rome, the king had overall authority. During Zenobia's rebellion, governors were appointed by the queen. Not all Palmyrenes accepted the dominion of the royal family; a senator, Septimius Haddudan, appears in a later Palmyrene inscription as aiding Aurelian's armies during the 273 rebellion. After the Roman destruction of the city, Palmyra was ruled directly by Rome, and then by a succession of other rulers, including the Burids and Ayyubids, and subordinate Bedouin chiefs—primarily the Fadl family, who governed for the Mamluks.

=== Military ===
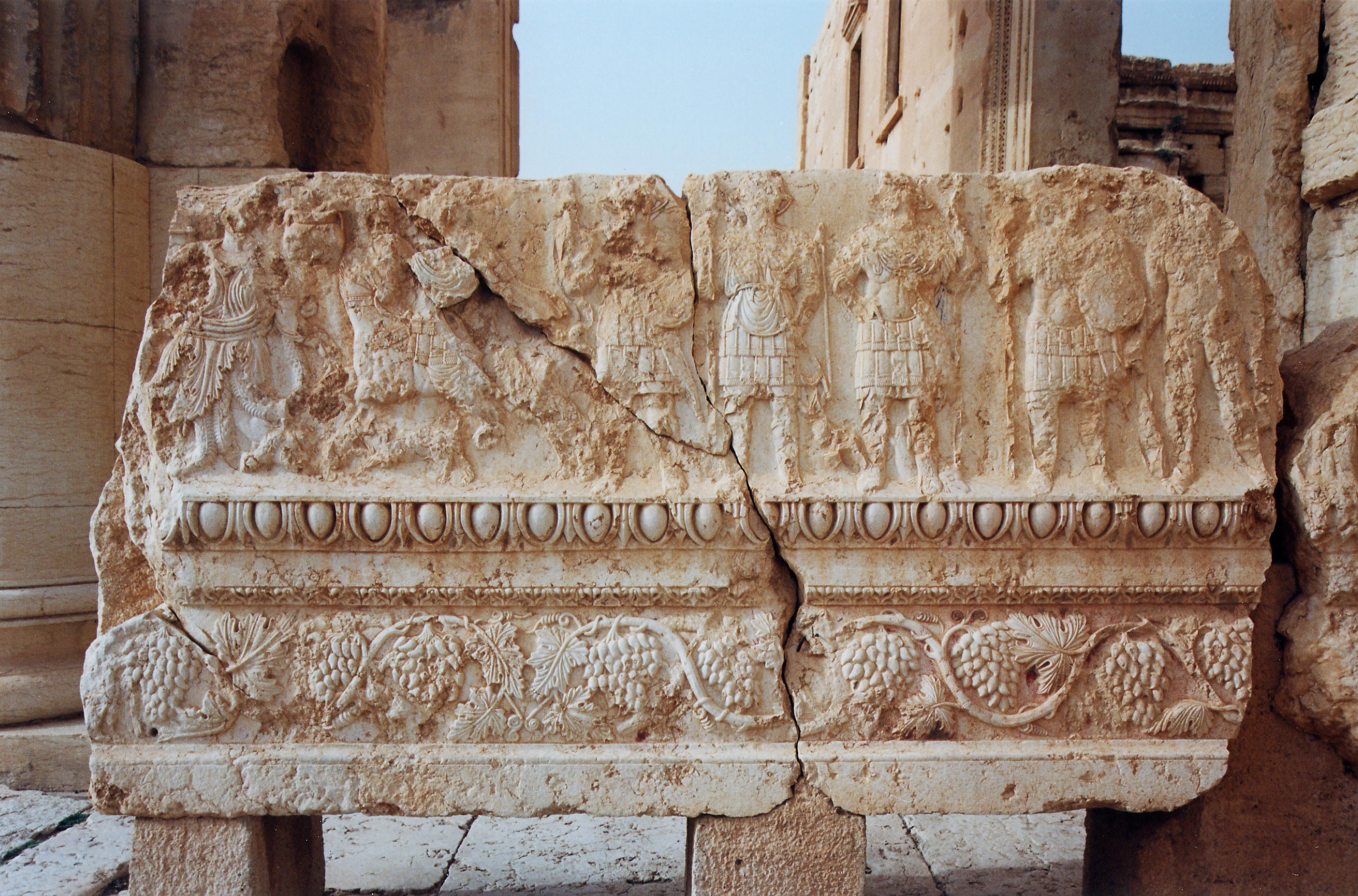
Relief in the Temple of Bel depicting Palmyrene war gods

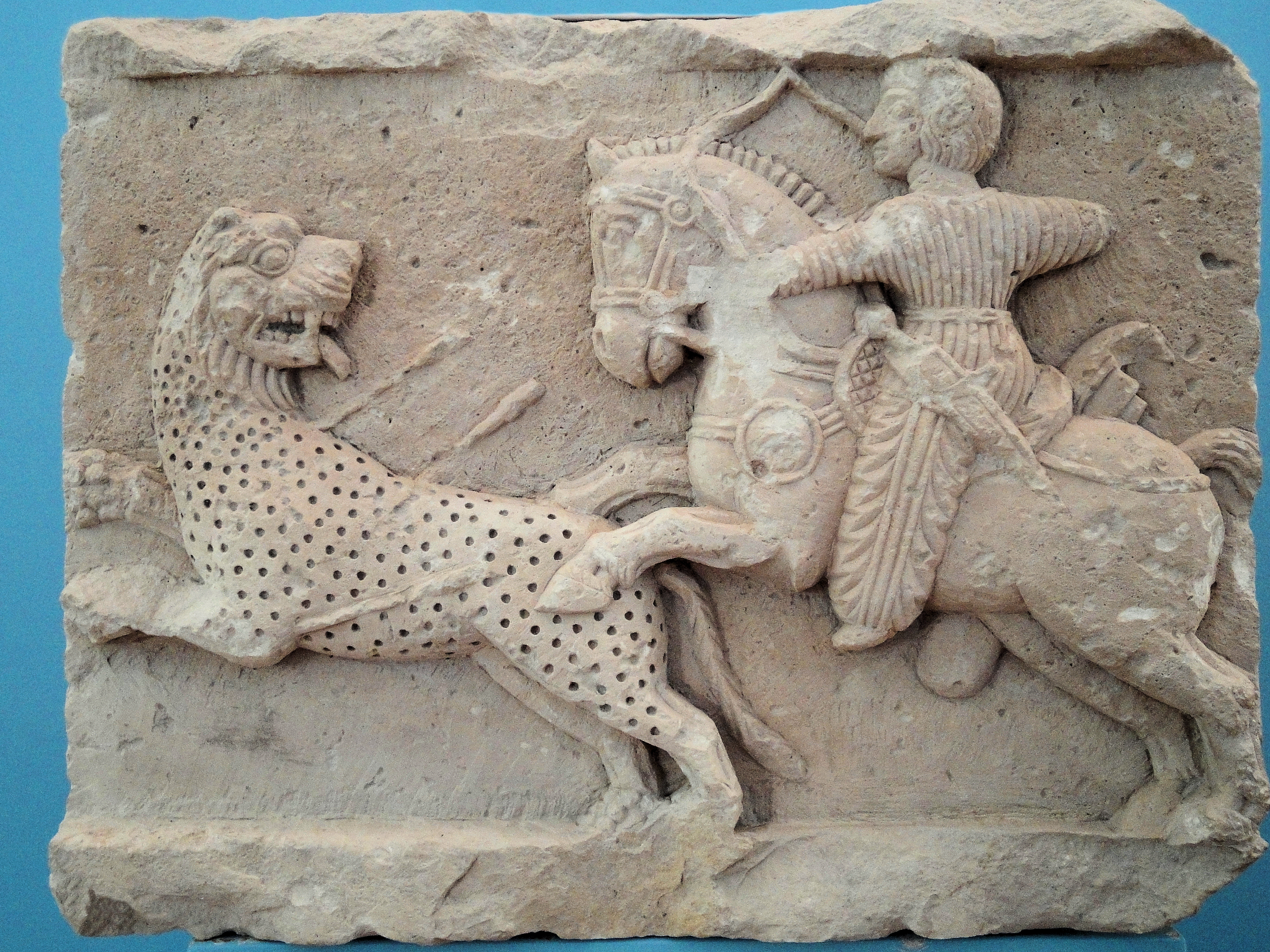
Palmyrene horseman, in a hunting scene.

Due to its military character and efficiency in battle, Palmyra was described by Irfan Shahîd as the "Sparta among the cities of the Orient, Arab and other, and even its gods were represented dressed in military uniforms." Palmyra's army protected the city and its economy, helping extend Palmyrene authority beyond the city walls and protecting the countryside's desert trade routes. The city had a substantial military; Zabdibel commanded a force of 10,000 in the third century BC, and Zenobia led an army of 70,000 in the Battle of Emesa. Soldiers were recruited from the city and its territories, spanning several thousand square kilometers from the outskirts of Homs to the Euphrates valley. Non-Palmyrene soldiers were also recruited; a Nabatean cavalryman is recorded in 132 as serving in a Palmyrene unit stationed at Anah. Palmyra's recruiting system is unknown; the city might have selected and equipped the troops and the strategoi led, trained and disciplined them.

The strategoi were appointed by the council with the approval of Rome. The royal army in the mid 3rd century AD was under the leadership of the monarch aided by generals, and was modeled on the Sasanians in arms and tactics. The Palmyrenes were noted archers. They used infantry while a heavily armored cavalry (clibanarii) constituted the main attacking force. (Note: The Palmyrene army that invaded Egypt was mainly composed of clibanarii supported by archers.) Palmyra's infantry was armed with swords, lances and small round shields; the clibanarii were fully armored (including their horses), and used heavy spears (kontos) 3.65 metres (12.0 ft) long without shields.

==== Relations with Rome ====
Citing the Palmyrenes' combat skills in large, sparsely populated areas, the Romans formed a Palmyrene auxilia to serve in the Imperial Roman army. Vespasian reportedly had 8,000 Palmyrene archers in Judea, and Trajan established the first Palmyrene Auxilia in 116 (a camel cavalry unit, Ala I Ulpia dromedariorum Palmyrenorum). Palmyrene units were deployed throughout the Roman Empire, (Note: A Palmyrene monument was discovered near Newcastle in England; it was set by a Palmyrene named Baratas, who was either a soldier or a camp follower.) serving in Dacia late in Hadrian's reign, and at El Kantara in Numidia and Moesia under Antoninus Pius. During the late second century Rome formed the Cohors XX Palmyrenorum, which was stationed in Dura-Europos.

== Religion ==
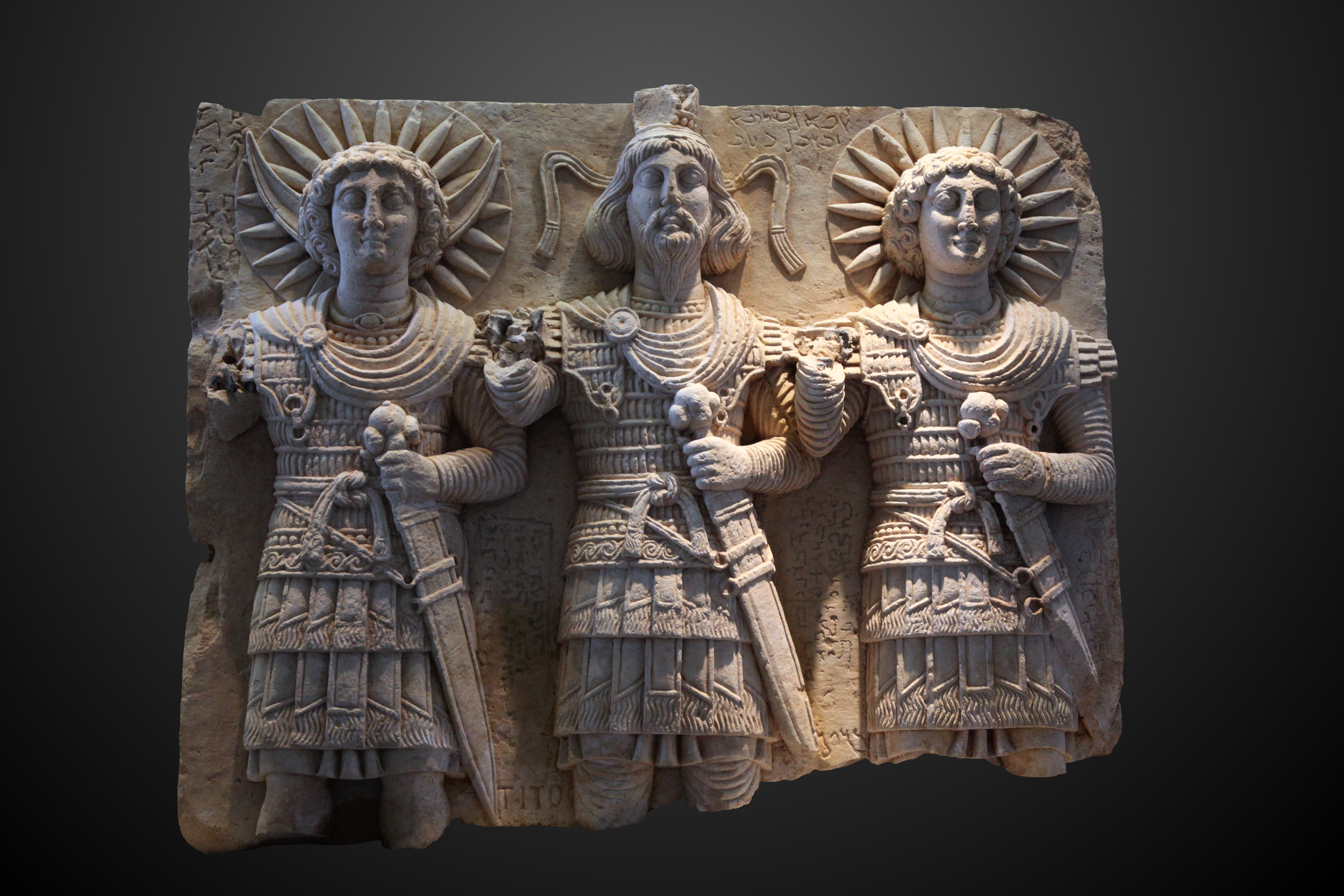
Baalshamin (center), Aglibol (left) and Malakbel (right)

Palmyra's gods were primarily part of the northwestern Semitic pantheon, with the addition of gods from the Mesopotamian and Arab pantheons. The city's chief pre-Hellenistic deity was called Bol, an abbreviation of Baal (a northwestern Semitic honorific). The Babylonian cult of Bel-Marduk influenced the Palmyrene religion and by 217 BC the chief deity's name was changed to Bel. This did not indicate the replacing of the northwestern Semitic Bol with a Mesopotamian deity, but was a mere change in the name.

Second in importance, after the supreme deity, were over sixty ancestral gods of the Palmyrene clans. Palmyra had unique deities, such as the god of justice and Efqa's guardian Yarhibol, the sun god Malakbel, and the moon god Aglibol. Palmyrenes worshiped regional deities, including the greater Levantine gods Astarte, Baal-hamon, Baalshamin and Atargatis; the Babylonian gods Nabu and Nergal, and the Arab Azizos, Arsu, Šams and Al-lāt.

The deities worshiped in the countryside were depicted as camel or horse riders and bore Arab names. The nature of those deities is uncertain as only names are known, most importantly Abgal. The Palmyrene pantheon included ginnaye (some were given the designation "Gad"), a group of lesser deities popular in the countryside, who were similar to the Arab jinn and the Roman genius. Ginnaye were believed to have the appearance and behavior of humans, similar to Arab jinn. Unlike jinn, however, the ginnaye could not possess or injure humans. Their role was similar to the Roman genius: tutelary deities who guarded individuals and their caravans, cattle and villages.

Although the Palmyrenes worshiped their deities as individuals, some were associated with other gods. Bel had Astarte-Belti as his consort, and formed a triple deity with Aglibol and Yarhibol (who became a sun god in his association with Bel). Malakbel was part of many associations, pairing with Gad Taimi and Aglibol, and forming a triple deity with Baalshamin and Aglibol. Palmyra hosted an Akitu (spring festival) each Nisan. Each of the city's four-quarters had a sanctuary for a deity considered ancestral to the resident tribe; Malakbel and Aglibol's sanctuary was in the Komare quarter. The Baalshamin sanctuary was in the Ma'zin quarter, the Arsu sanctuary in the Mattabol quarter, and the Atargatis sanctuary in the fourth tribe's quarter. (Note: The fourth tribe's name is not certain but most likely the Mita.)

The priests of Palmyra were selected from the city's leading families, and are recognized in busts through their headdresses which have the shape of a polos adorned with laurel wreath or other tree made of bronze among other elements. The high priest of Bel's temple was the highest religious authority and headed the clergy of priests who were organized into collegia each headed by a higher priest. The personnel of Efqa spring's sanctuary dedicated to Yarhibol belonged to a special class of priests as they were oracles. Palmyra's paganism was replaced with Christianity as the religion spread across the Roman Empire, and a bishop was reported in the city by 325. Although most temples became churches, the Temple of Al-lāt was destroyed in 385 at the order of Maternus Cynegius (the eastern praetorian prefect). After the Muslim conquest in 634 Islam gradually replaced Christianity, and the last known bishop of Palmyra was consecrated after 818.

=== Malakbel and the Roman Sol Invictus ===
The first Palmyrene inscriptions published in modern times, now in the Capitoline Museums, Rome. Left: Votive relief with Greek and Palmyrene dedication to Aglibol and Malakbel, AD 235–236. Right: Altar with a Latin dedication to Sol Sanctissimus and a Palmyrene dedication to Malakbel, second half of the 1st century AD.

In 274, following his victory over Palmyra, Aurelian dedicated a large temple of Sol Invictus in Rome; most scholars consider Aurelian's Sol Invictus to be of Syrian origin, either a continuation of emperor Elagabalus cult of Sol Invictus Elagabalus, or Malakbel of Palmyra. The Palmyrene deity was commonly identified with the Roman god Sol and he had a temple dedicated for him on the right bank of the Tiber since the second century. Also, he bore the epithet Invictus and was known with the name Sol "Sanctissimus", the latter was an epithet Aurelian bore on an inscription from Capena.

The position of the Palmyrene deity as Aurelian's Sol Invictus is inferred from a passage by Zosimus reading: "and the magnificent temple of the sun he (i.e. Aurelian) embellished with votive gifts from Palmyra, setting up statues of Helios and Bel". Three deities from Palmyra exemplified solar features: Malakbel, Yarhibol and Šams, hence the identification of the Palmyrene Helios appearing in Zosimus' work with Malakbel. Some scholars criticize the notion of Malakbel's identification with Sol Invictus; according to Gaston Halsberghe, the cult of Malakbel was too local for it to become an imperial Roman god and Aurelian's restoration of Bel's temple and sacrifices dedicated to Malakbel were a sign of his attachment to the sun god in general and his respect to the many ways in which the deity was worshiped. Richard Stoneman suggested another approach in which Aurelian simply borrowed the imagery of Malakbel to enhance his own solar deity. The relation between Malakbel and Sol Invictus can not be confirmed and will probably remain unresolved.

== Economy ==
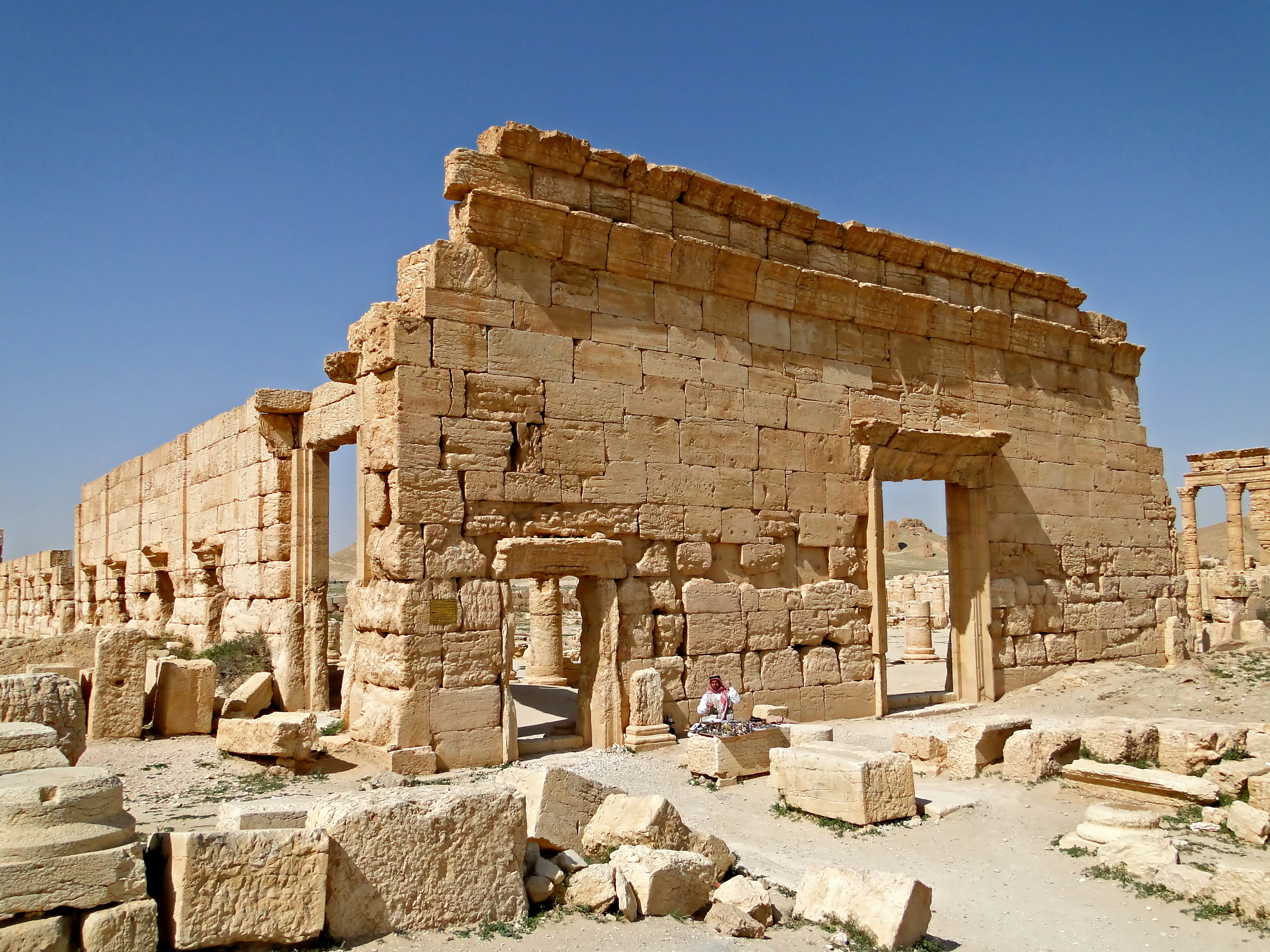
Palmyra's Agora; the two front entrances lead to the interior, the city's marketplace

Palmyra's economy before and at the beginning of the Roman period was based on agriculture, pastoralism, and commerce; the city served as a rest station for the caravans which sporadically crossed the desert. By the end of the first century BC, the city had a mixed economy based on agriculture, pastoralism, taxation, and, most importantly, the caravan trade. Taxation was an important source of revenue for the Palmyrene government. Caravaneers paid taxes in the building known as the Tariff Court, where a tax law dating to AD 137 was exhibited. The law regulated the tariffs paid by the merchants for goods sold at the internal market or exported from the city. (Note: Richard Stoneman proposes that the law regulated taxes imposed on goods destined for the internal market and did not cover the transit trade.)

After Palmyra's destruction in 273, it became a market for villagers and nomads from the surrounding area. The city regained some of its prosperity during the Umayyad era, indicated by the discovery of a large Umayyad souq in the colonnaded street. Palmyra was a minor trading center until its destruction in 1400; according to Sharaf ad-Din Ali Yazdi, Timur's men took 200,000 sheep, and the city was reduced into a settlement on the desert border whose inhabitants herded and cultivated small plots for vegetables and corn.

=== Agriculture and irrigation in classical Palmyra ===
The classicist Andrew M. Smith II suggested that most land in Palmyra was owned by the city, which collected grazing taxes. The oasis had about 1,000 hectares (2,500 acres) of irrigable land, which surrounded the city. The Palmyrenes constructed an extensive irrigation system in the northern mountains that consisted of reservoirs and channels to capture and store the occasional rainfall. The most notable irrigation work is Harbaqa Dam which was constructed in the late first century AD; (Note: The dating of the dam's construction was questioned by the archaeologist Denis Genequand who compared it to several Umayyad dams and suggested a date corresponding to the Umayyad period.) it is located 48 km (30 mi) southwest of the city and can collect 140,000 cubic metres (4,900,000 cu ft) of water. Terebinth trees in the hinterland were an important source of charcoal, resin and oil; although evidence is lacking, it is possible that olive trees were also planted, and dairy products were produced in the villages; it is also apparent that barley was cultivated. However, agriculture could not support the population and food was imported.

=== Commerce in classical Palmyra ===
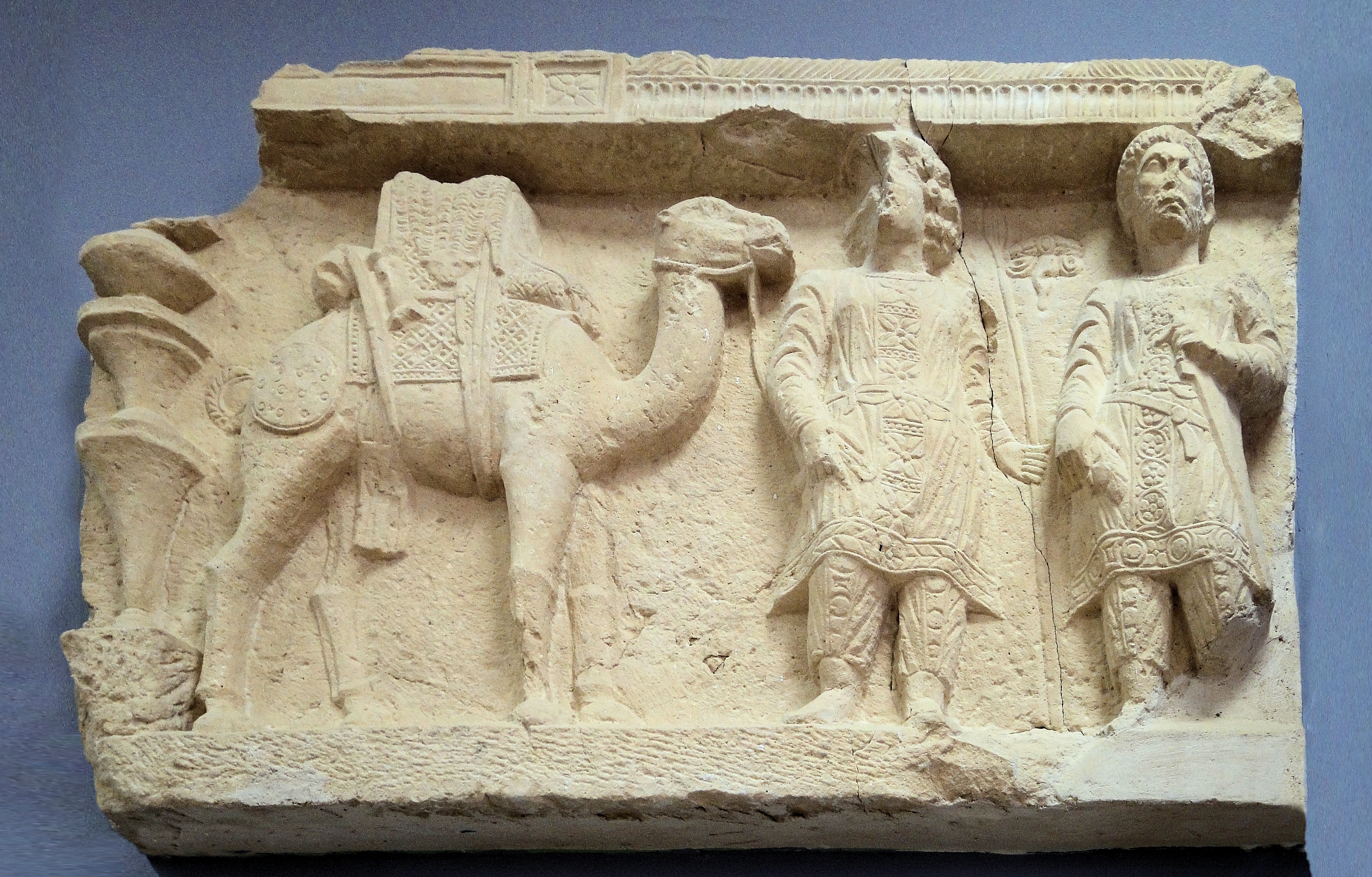
Palmyra caravan. Palmyra Archaeological Museum

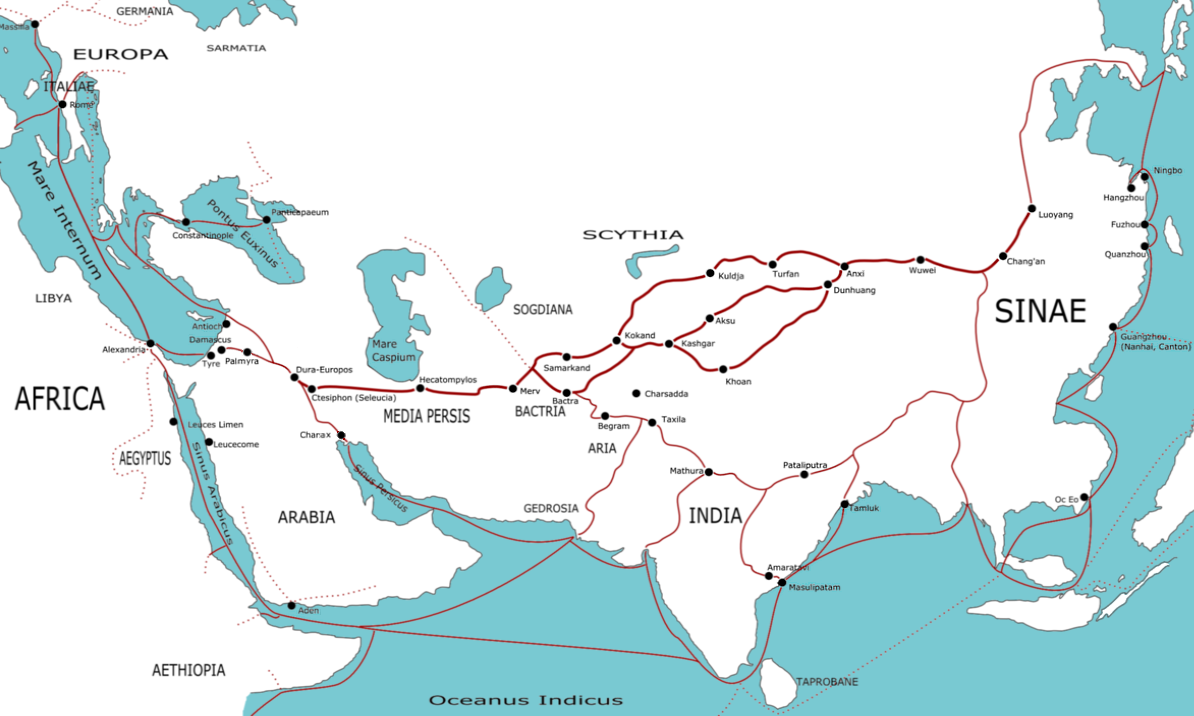
The Silk Road in Eurasia

If the Laghman II inscription in Afghanistan (commissioned by Ashoka) is referring to Palmyra, then the city's role in Central Asian overland trade was prominent as early as the third century BC. During the first centuries AD, Palmyra's main trade route ran east to the Euphrates where it connected at the city of Hīt. The route then ran south along the river toward the port of Charax Spasinu on the Persian Gulf, where Palmyrene ships traveled back and forth to India. Goods were imported from India, China and Transoxiana, and exported west to Emesa (or Antioch) then the Mediterranean ports, from which they were distributed throughout the Roman Empire. In addition to the usual route some Palmyrene merchants used the Red Sea, probably as a result of the Roman–Parthian Wars. Goods were carried overland from the seaports to a Nile port, and then taken to the Egyptian Mediterranean ports for export. Inscriptions attesting a Palmyrene presence in Egypt date to the reign of Hadrian.

Since Palmyra was not on the main trading route (which followed the Euphrates), the Palmyrenes secured the desert route passing their city. They connected it to the Euphrates valley, providing water and shelter. The Palmyrene route connected the Silk Road with the Mediterranean, and was used almost exclusively by the city's merchants, who maintained a presence in many cities, including Dura-Europos in 33 BC, Babylon by AD 19, Seleucia by AD 24, Dendera, Coptos, Bahrain, the Indus River Delta, Merv and Rome.

The caravan trade depended on patrons and merchants. Patrons owned the land on which the caravan animals were raised, providing animals and guards for the merchants. The lands were located in the numerous villages of the Palmyrene countryside. Although merchants used the patrons to conduct business, their roles often overlapped and a patron would sometimes lead a caravan. Commerce made Palmyra and its merchants among the wealthiest in the region. Some caravans were financed by a single merchant, such as Male' Agrippa (who financed Hadrian's visit in 129 and the 139 rebuilding of the Temple of Bel). The primary income-generating trade good was silk, which was exported from the East to the West. Other exported goods included jade, muslin, spices, ebony, ivory and precious stones. For its domestic market Palmyra imported a variety of goods including slaves, prostitutes, olive oil, dyed goods, myrrh and perfume.

== Research and excavations ==
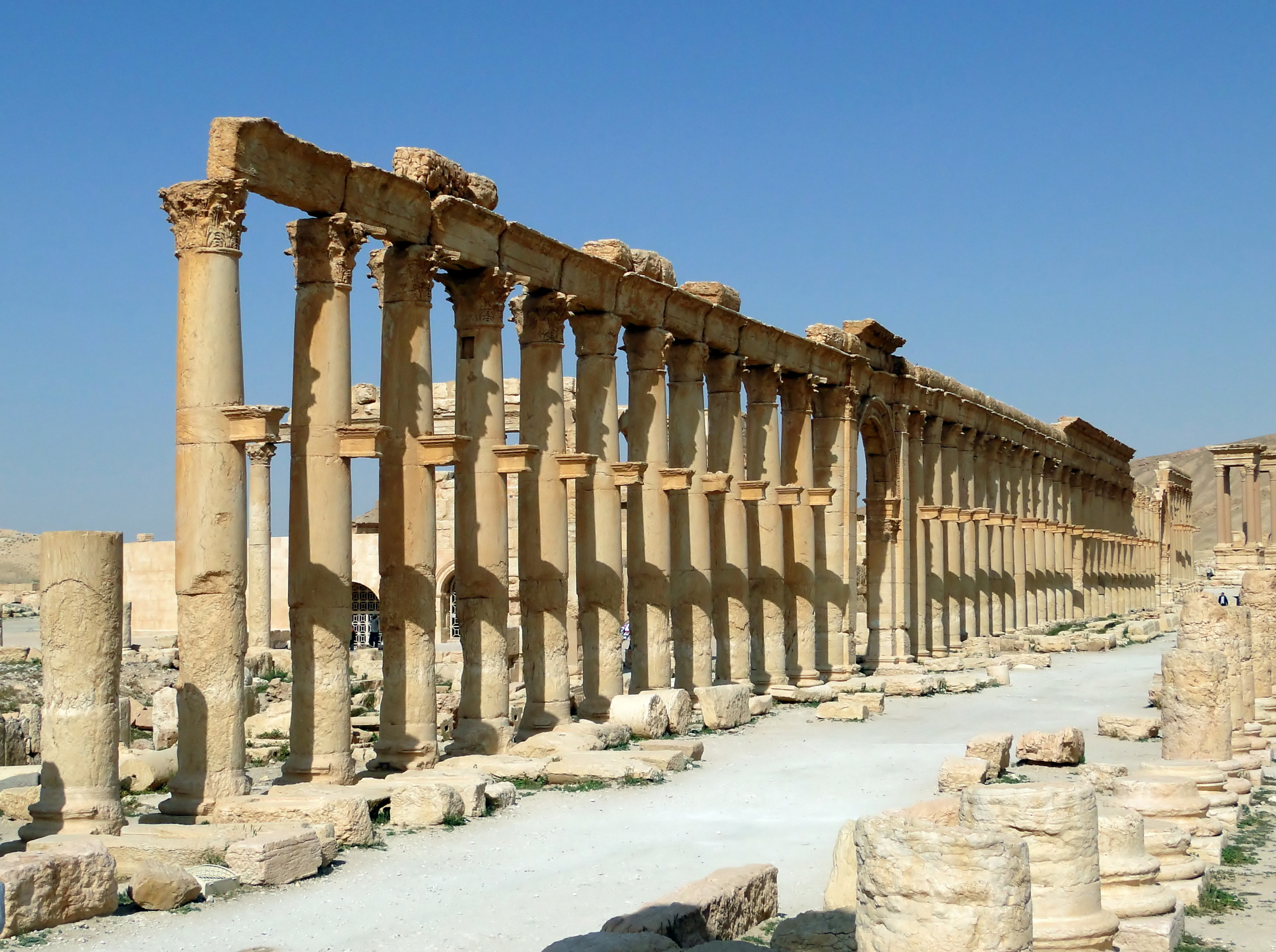
The Colonnade

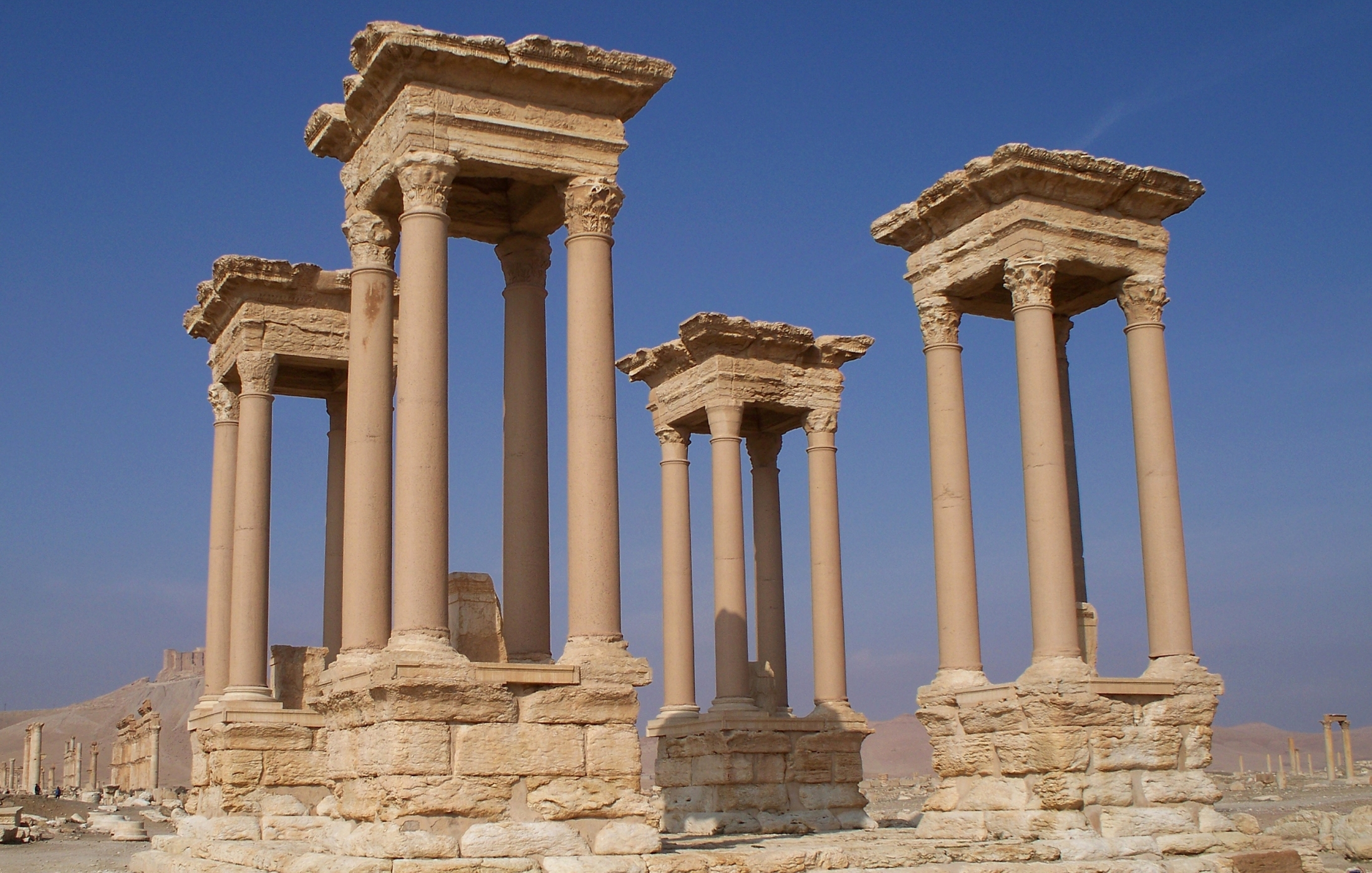
The Tetrapylon (destroyed in 2017)

Palmyra's first scholarly description appeared in a 1695 paper in the Philosophical Transactions of the Royal Society by William Hallifax followed by a 1696 book by Abednego Seller. In 1751, an expedition led by Robert Wood and James Dawkins studied Palmyra's architecture. French artist and architect Louis-François Cassas conducted an extensive survey of the city's monuments in 1785, publishing over a hundred drawings of Palmyra's civic buildings and tombs. Palmyra was photographed for the first time in 1864 by Louis Vignes. In 1882, the Palmyra Tariff, an inscribed stone slab from AD 137 in Greek and Palmyrene detailing import and export taxation, was discovered by prince Semyon Semyonovich Abamelik-Lazarev in the Tariff Court. It has been described by the historian John F. Matthews as "one of the most important single items of evidence for the economic life of any part of the Roman Empire". In 1901, the slab was gifted by the Ottoman Sultan Abdul Hamid II to the Russian Tsar and is now in the Hermitage Museum in Saint Petersburg.

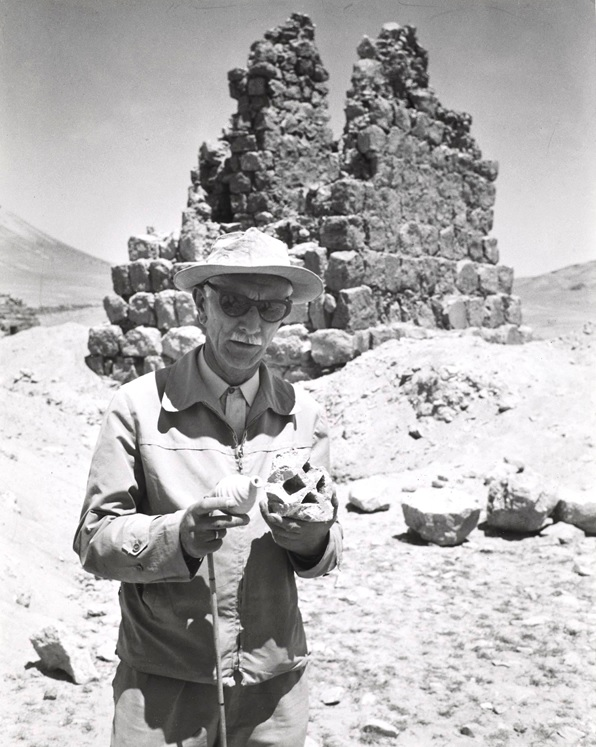
Excavations at Palmyra, 1962, Polish archaeologist Kazimierz Michałowski

Palmyra's first excavations were conducted in 1902 by Otto Puchstein and in 1917 by Theodor Wiegand. In 1929, French general director of antiquities of Syria and Lebanon Henri Seyrig began large-scale excavation of the site; interrupted by World War II, it resumed soon after the war's end. Seyrig started with the Temple of Bel in 1929 and between 1939 and 1940 he excavated the Agora. Daniel Schlumberger conducted excavations in the Palmyrene northwest countryside in 1934 and 1935 where he studied different local sanctuaries in the Palmyrene villages. From 1954 to 1956, a Swiss expedition organized by UNESCO excavated the Temple of Baalshamin. Since 1958, the site has been excavated by the Syrian Directorate-General of Antiquities, and Polish expeditions of the Polish Centre of Mediterranean Archaeology University of Warsaw, led consequtively by Kazimierz Michałowski, Anna Sadurska, Michał Gawlikowski and Grzegorz Majcherek. The stratigraphic sounding beneath the Temple of Bel was conducted in 1967 by Robert du Mesnil du Buisson, who also discovered the Temple of Baal-hamon in the 1970s. In 1980, the historic site including the necropolis outside the walls was declared a World Heritage Site by the UNESCO.

The Polish expedition concentrated its work on the Camp of Diocletian while the Syrian Directorate-General of Antiquities excavated the Temple of Nabu. Most of the hypogea were excavated jointly by the Polish expedition and the Syrian Directorate, while the area of Efqa was excavated by Jean Starcky and Jafar al-Hassani. The Palmyrene irrigation system was discovered in 2008 by Jørgen Christian Meyer who researched the Palmyrene countryside through ground inspections and satellite images. Most of Palmyra still remains unexplored especially the residential quarters in the north and south while the necropolis has been thoroughly excavated by the Directorate and the Polish expedition. Since the initiation of archaeological research in Palmyra, many international teams worked on the site, including expeditions from Japan, France, Poland, The United States, Italy and Norway. Excavation expeditions left Palmyra in 2011 due to the Syrian Civil War.

== See also ==
- Aureliano in Palmira
- Crisis of the Third Century
- Palmyrene (Unicode block)
- Thirty Tyrants (Roman)
- Septimius Worod
- Zabdas
