= Palmyrene inscriptions =

Aramaic inscriptions from Palmyra

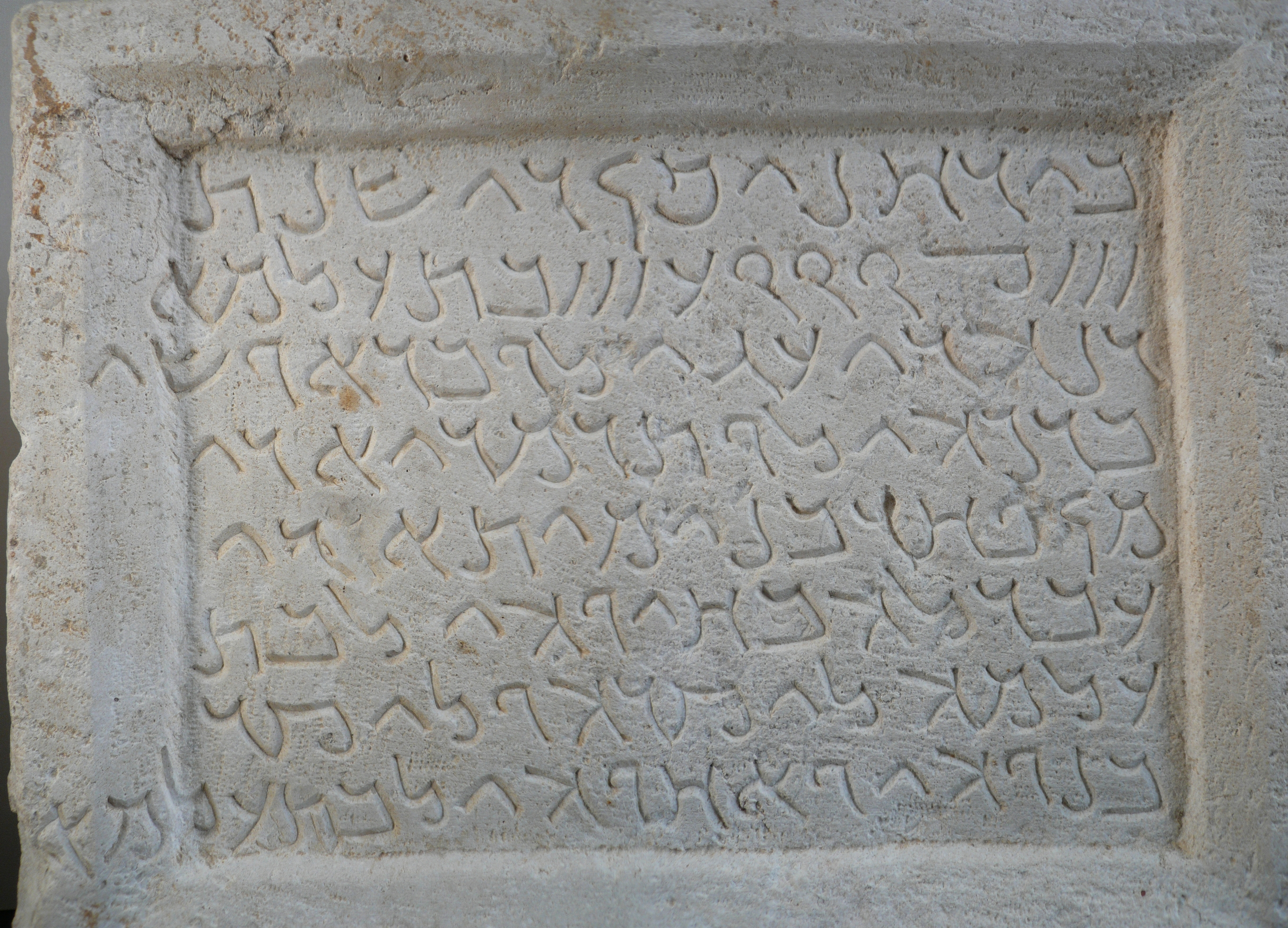
Palmyrene funerary foundation inscription in the Louvre, discovered in Palmyra: AO 2203, PAT 0468, RES 1072

Palmyrene inscriptions are a large corpus of Aramaic inscriptions discovered primarily in the ancient caravan city of Palmyra in central Syria. The texts date mainly from the 1st century BCE to the 3rd century CE and are written in the Palmyrene Aramaic dialect using the Palmyrene script.

The decipherment of Palmyrene was the first decipherment of a dead language in modern times, in 1754. The first published and translated of the Canaanite and Aramaic inscriptions was a Palmyrene inscription, and today the longest known Canaanite or Aramaic inscription – the Palmyra Tariff – is also Palmyrene. Peter T. Daniels described the ultimate decipherment by Jean-Jacques Barthélemy as straightforward, since: "the copies were (finally) reliable; there were obviously-paired bilinguals; they contained proper names; there were one-to-one correspondences between letters in the two versions; the unknown was in a familiar language; the identity of that language was known; the script was closely related to and resembled known ones".

Approximately 3,200 such inscriptions are known; the Palmyrene Aramaic Texts (PAT) corpus includes 2,832 inscriptions, and Jean-Baptiste Yon’s subsequent L’épigraphie palmyrénienne depuis PAT, 1996–2011 added an extra 185 inscriptions. This compares with over c.500 in Greek and c.50 in Latin found in the region of Palmyra. Most of the known inscriptions were found in Palmyra and its surrounding necropoleis during archaeological excavations at Palmyra in the late nineteenth and twentieth centuries. Others were discovered at sites connected with Palmyrene trade networks across the Near East and the Mediterranean, including Dura-Europos and Egypt. The texts are typically carved on stone monuments, funerary busts, tomb architecture, altars, and building blocks.

Most of the inscriptions are undated, with exact provenance unknown. The earliest dated Palmyrene inscription is a dedication by the priests of Bel from 44 BC, and none are known following the defeat of Zenobia by Aurelian in 272 CE. After this, Greek inscriptions in Palmyra continued in reduced numbers until 562 CE, Latin disappeared after the early fourth century, and a small number of Hebrew inscriptions are known from the fourth century.

A number of multilingual inscriptions are known – many Greek inscriptions are bilingual with an Aramaic version, and some are trilingual with the addition of Latin. The inscriptions are crucial to scholarly knowledge of Palmyra, as classical texts are limited to excerpts from Pliny the Elder (Natural History 5.88) and Appian (Civil Wars 5.9), and later narratives such as Zosimus describing the rise and fall of Palmyra under Odaenathus and Zenobia.

Today, many inscriptions are preserved in museums such as the National Museum of Damascus, the Louvre, the British Museum, and other international collections. A number of inscriptions in situ or at the Palmyra Museum were subject to the destruction of cultural heritage by the Islamic State between 2015 and 2017.

== Discovery and decipherment ==
The first published Palmyrene inscription was the altar inscription from Rome now catalogued as CIS II 3902 (Rome 1), published by Jan Gruter in 1616. A second inscription, also from Rome, CIS II 3903 (Rome 2), was later published by Jacob Spon in 1683. These inscriptions, preserved in the Capitoline Museums, were recognised as belonging to an unknown script associated with the ancient city of Palmyra. About a decade later, following the first modern European expedition to Palmyra in 1691, William Hallifax published an account in the Philosophical Transactions of the Royal Society in 1695, including a copy of an inscription from a lintel from the entrance gate to the modern village later catalogued as CIS II 4202. Halifax observed that the unfamiliar script frequently appeared beneath Greek inscriptions and likely represented the same text in the local language. Shortly afterward, Edward Bernard and Thomas Smith published a collection of Palmyrene inscriptions in 1698, including what later became known as CIS II 3944, CIS II 4214, and CIS II 3943. However, all these copies were inaccurate, making decipherment challenging.

The decisive breakthrough occurred after the visit of Robert Wood and James Dawkins to Palmyra in 1751. Their illustrated work The Ruins of Palmyra (1753) provided more accurate copies of numerous inscriptions, including the important Greek–Palmyrene bilingual inscription which became known as CIS II 3940. Using this material together with the previously published inscriptions (CIS II 3902, 3903, 4202, 3944, 4214, and 3943), the French scholar Jean-Jacques Barthélemy and the English antiquarian John Swinton independently deciphered the script in 1754.

Barthélemy’s method relied on comparing the Greek and Palmyrene texts of the bilingual inscriptions. By identifying repeated proper names and chronological formulas in inscriptions such as CIS II 3940, he was able to assign phonetic values to the Palmyrene letters and reconstruct the alphabet. Within a short time he produced a working reading of the inscriptions and demonstrated that the language was a dialect of Aramaic. The decipherment of Palmyrene thus became the first successful decipherment of a previously "dead" ancient script in modern scholarship.

Earliest published Palmyrene inscriptions, used in the first decipherment
Image	Identification	Location	First published	Hallifax (1890)	Bernard (1698)	Hyde (1700)	Wood (1753)	Barthélemy (1759)	de Vogüé (1868)	NE (1898)	CIS II (1926)
An inscription	Rom. I (Gruter)	Capitoline Museums	1616			2		3		477,1	3902
An inscription	Rom. II (Spon)	Capitoline Museums	1683			1		4		477,2	3903
	Hallifax	Lintel of the entrance gate to the modern village	1691	p. 280	XII	3			21	480,10	4202
	Bernard’s 2nd	Great Colonnade column	1698	p. 287	XIV	5	V		22	460,9	3944
	Bernard’s 3rd	Three architrave fragments found on the ground near Temple of Baalshamin	1698	p. 292	XVII				71		4214
	Bernard’s 4th	Three architrave fragments found on the ground near Temple of Baalshamin	1698	p. 293	XVIII				71		4214
	Bernard’s 5th	Great Colonnade column	1698	p. 286	XIX	4	IX	2	27		3943
	Wood VIII	Great Colonnade column	1753				VIII	1	26	461,12	3940

== Corpora ==
The first significant and accurate group of inscriptions was published by Robert Wood and James Dawkins following their visit to Palmyra in 1751; their book (1753) included copies of 11 Greek-Palmyrene bilingual inscriptions, 15 Greek-only and two Palmyrene-only inscriptions. The next significant publication of new inscriptions came a century later following the expedition of William Henry Waddington in 1861, organized on the advice of Eugène-Melchior de Vogüé. Waddington's records of 144 Palmyrene inscriptions were published by de Vogüé in 1868. At the beginning of the twentieth century selections of inscriptions were published George Albert Cooke and Mark Lidzbarski, and comprehensive corpus of Palmyrene Aramaic inscriptions was produced in the Corpus Inscriptionum Semiticarum (1926–1949), edited by Jean-Baptiste Chabot. The next phase of significant publications were made by Jean Cantineau, who initiated the series Inventaire des inscriptions de Palmyre (1930–1939), later continued by Jean Starcky, Javier Teixidor, and Adnan Bounni. In 1996 a consolidated collection of the Aramaic inscriptions was published as Palmyrene Aramaic Texts (PAT) by Delbert R. Hillers and Eleonora Cussini as part of the Comprehensive Aramaic Lexicon project. The work assembled approximately 2,830 inscriptions and remains the principal reference for Palmyrene Aramaic epigraphy.

These major scholarly corpora and catalogues are listed below:

- CIS – Corpus Inscriptionum Semiticarum, an early comprehensive collection of Semitic inscriptions. The first Palmyrene volume (II t.3 f.1) was edited by Jean-Baptiste Chabot in 1926.
- NE - Handbuch der Nordsemitischen Epigraphik, 1898
- IIP / Inv – Inventaire des inscriptions de Palmyre, 1930-75 in twelve fascicules, a catalogue of Palmyrene inscriptions not included in CIS.
- IP - Jean Cantineau's Inscriptions palmyréniennes, 1930
- Tad - Jean Cantineau's Tadmorea in Syria, 1931-38
- RTP – Recueil Des Tessères de Palmyre, 1955
- BS III – Dunant, Christiane (1971). Le sanctuaire de Baalshamin à Palmyre: Les inscriptions. Vol. 3. Institut Suisse.
- RSP – Michał Gawlikowski's Recueil d'inscriptions palmyréniennes provenant de fouilles syriennes et polonaises récentes à Palmyre, 1974
- PAT – Palmyrene Aramaic Texts, a modern concordance and synthesis of earlier publications. In the reference system used in Palmyrene Aramaic Texts, the ID numbers ("sigla") follow a priority order beginning with CIS

A selected concordance is shown below, all of which appear in PAT:

Type	CIS	IP	IIP	Tad	NE	RTP/RSP	Vogue	NSI	TSSI	Other
Honorary inscriptions	3915		9 13		457 a.1 XXXVII, 1					
Honorary inscriptions	3930		2 2		458 a.2 XXXIX, 4		1	110	32	
Honorary inscriptions	3952		5 3		458 a.3 XXXVII, 2		11	119		
Honorary inscriptions	3948		3 28		458 a.4 XXXIX, 5		6	115		
Honorary inscriptions	3932		3 22		459 a.5 XXXVII, 3		15	121	33	
Honorary inscriptions	3933		3 21		459 a.6 XXXVII, 4		4	113		
Honorary inscriptions	3934		3 14		460 a.7 XXXVII, 5		17	123		
Honorary inscriptions	3936		3 13		460 a.8 XXXVII, 6		7	116		
Honorary inscriptions	3944		3 16		460 a.9 XXXVII, 7		22	125		
Honorary inscriptions	3939		3 10		461 a.10 XXXVII, 8		24	127		
Honorary inscriptions	3938		3 11		461 a.11 XXXVII, 9		25	128		
Honorary inscriptions	3940		3 9		461 a.12 XXXVIII, 2		26	129		
Honorary inscriptions	3945		3 17		462 a.13 XXXVIII, 1		23	126		
Honorary inscriptions	3946		3 19		462 a.14 XXXVIII, 3		28	130	35	
Honorary inscriptions	3947		3 20		462 a.15 XXXVIII, 4		29	131	36	
Honorary inscriptions	3927						3	112		
Honorary inscriptions	3928						5	114		
Honorary inscriptions	3931		2 3				2	111		
Honorary inscriptions	3937		3 12				20	124		
Honorary inscriptions	3954		5 5				13	120		
Honorary inscriptions	3959		1 2				16	122		BS III 44
Honorary inscriptions			11 100						28	
Honorary inscriptions				17					29	
Honorary inscriptions	3917		9 15						30	
Honorary inscriptions			10 81						31	
Honorary inscriptions	3971								34	
The customs and tax tariff	3913		10 143		463–73 b XXXIX, 3			147	37	
Votive inscriptions	3983		1 4		473 c.1 XXXVIII, 5			133		Eut 4
Votive inscriptions	3978				474 c.2 XXXVIII, 6			136		Oxford 1751
Votive inscriptions	3994				474 c.3 XXXVIII, 8		124			
Votive inscriptions	3986				474 c.4 XL, 2		73	134		
Votive inscriptions	3996				474 c.5 XXXVIII, 8		75	135		
Votive inscriptions	4014				475 c.6 XL, 3					Eut 6
Votive inscriptions	4027				475 c.7 XXXVIII, 10		84			
Votive inscriptions	4029				475 c.8 XXXVIII, 9		82			
Votive inscriptions	3981				475 c.9 XXXVIII, 7		93	139		
Votive inscriptions	4030				476 c.10 XL, 8		90			
Votive inscriptions	3976				476 c.11 XL, 5		95			
Votive inscriptions	4051				476 c.12 XL, 4		92			
Votive inscriptions	4046				476 c.13 XL, 6		116			
Votive inscriptions	3912				477 c.14 XL, 1					Brit Mus
Votive inscriptions	3902				477 (Rome) 1 XLII, 9					Capitol Mus
Votive inscriptions	3903				477 (Rome) 2 XLII, 10					Capitol Mus
Votive inscriptions									38	BS III 1-2
Votive inscriptions									39	BS III 24
Votive inscriptions			12 48						40	
Votive inscriptions	3974								41	
Votive inscriptions	3973							140B	42	
Funerary inscriptions	4109		4 28		478 d.α1 XL, 11		30a	141		
Funerary inscriptions	4113		8 56		478 d.α2 XL					
Funerary inscriptions	4116				478 d.α3 XL, 10		32			
Funerary inscriptions	4122		7 6a		478 d.α4 XXXIX, 1		34			
Funerary inscriptions	4130				478 d.α5					
Funerary inscriptions	4164		4 19		479 d.α6 XL, 12		31			
Funerary inscriptions	4194				479 d.α7					
Funerary inscriptions	4195				479 d.α8 XL					Constantinople
Funerary inscriptions	4199				479 d.α9			143	44	Nold
Funerary inscriptions	4202		8 55		480 d.α10 XXXIX, 2		14			
Funerary inscriptions	4218				480 d.α11 XLII, 2					Louvre
Funerary inscriptions	4403				480 d.β1 XLII, 8					Berlin
Funerary inscriptions	4357				481 d.β2 XLII, 3					Copenhagen
Funerary inscriptions	4281				481 d.β3 XLII, 6					Copenhagen
Funerary inscriptions	4283				481 d.β4 XLII, 43					Copenhagen
Funerary inscriptions	4384				481 d.β5 XLII, 5					Copenhagen
Funerary inscriptions	4394				481 d.β6 XLII, 7					Copenhagen
Funerary inscriptions	4502				481 d.β7					Louvre
Funerary inscriptions	4501				481 d.β8 XLII, 10					Louvre
Funerary inscriptions	4225				481 d.β9 XLII, 9					Eut 19
Funerary inscriptions	3905				481 d.γ1 XLII, 1					Capitol Mus
Funerary inscriptions	3908				482 d.γ2 XLII, 11			146		Constantine
Funerary inscriptions	3909				482 d.γ3 XLII, 12					Constantine
Funerary inscriptions	3906				482 d.γ4					
Funerary inscriptions	3901				482 d.γ5 XLII, 13					South Sheilds
Funerary inscriptions									43	MelCol p.161
Funerary inscriptions									45	Ber 38, 119-140
Lychnarion inscription					483 e.1–6	RTP				
Inscriptions on clay tablets		67			483 f XLII, 1					
	3914		9 25							
	3916		9 14a							
	3918		9 18							
	3919		9 19							
	3920		9 32							
	3921		9 31							
	3922		9 9							
	3923		9 8							
	3924		9 6a							
	3925		9 6b							
	3935		3 15							
	3941		3 8							
	3942		3 7							
	3943		3 6							
	3949		3 29							
	3950		5 1							
	3951		5 2							
	3953		5 4							
	3955		5 8							
	3956		5 7							
	3957		5 6							
	3958		1 3							
	3960	9	10 87–88							
	3961		10 89							
	3962		10 17							
	3963		10 47							
	3966		2 1							
	3967		6 7							
	3968		6 6							
	3969		11 84							
	3977		6 11							
	3984		5 9							
	3985		6 1							
	3988		6 3							
	3989		6 9							
	3993			13						
	3998		6 5							
	4010		11 23							
	4043		11 18							
	4075		11 29							
	4102		6 12							
	4114		4 4a							
	4115		4 18							
	4121		4 5							
	4123		4 6							
	4124		4 3							
	4125		8 160							
	4126		8 161a							
	4127a		8 161b							
	4127b		8 161c							
	4134-58		4 27							
	4162	65	7 1a							
	4163		8 61	39						
	4166		12 16							
	4168		4 9a							
	4170		4 23							
	4171-4186			27						
	4187		4 2							
	4192		4 22							
	4197	38	7 15a,b							
	4201		7 4							
	4206		4 1a							
	4207		4 1b							
	4208		4 1c							
	4212	39	7 13							
	4213		7 11							
	4214		7 2							
	4216	71	4 21							
	4231		8 194							
	4232		4 17							
	4235		8 57							
	4236		7 6b							
	4237		7 8							
	4239		8 193							
	4241		8 100							
	4483	1								
	4486	3								
	4613	4								
	4614	2								
		6	10 39							
		7	10 40							
		8	10 78							
		12	4 9b							
		13	4 9c							
		15	4 9d							
		17	4 9e							
		22	8 145							
		24	8 144							
		29	8 169							
		30	1 5							
		31	9 28							
		32	9 29							
		33	12 21							
		35	5 10							
		40	4 13							
		41	4 14							
		45	8 200							
		47	3 2							
		48	3 4							
		53	3 25							
		59	4 16							
		63	7 9							
		64	7 7							
		66	8 159							
		68	4 8							
		69	4 10							
		70	4 11							
		72	8 68							
		74	11 7							
		75	8 109							
		76	8 19							
		77	8 65							
		86				RTP 92				
		87				RTP 77				
		88				RTP 80				
		89				RTP 81				
		90				RTP 306				
		91				RTP 184				
		92				RTP 714				
		93				RTP 315				
		94				RTP 580				
		95				RTP 821				
		96				RTP 311				
		97				RTP 752				
		98				RTP 247				
		99				RTP 303				
		100				RTP 996				
		101				RTP 1				
		102				RTP 39				
		103				RTP 289				
		104				RTP 131				
		105				RTP 15				
			9 1	1						
			9 36	2						
			11 87	6						
			8 71	12b						
				14		RTP 125				
			10 105	30						
			10 107	28a						
			10 111	28b						
			12 17			RSP 105				
			12 14			RSP 51				

== Types of inscriptions ==
Palmyrene inscriptions covered a range of social and religious contexts:

- Funerary inscriptions, among the most common, typically appear on tomb façades, loculi (burial niches), or funerary reliefs and record the name and lineage of the deceased. Many are accompanied by Palmyrene funerary reliefs. The inscriptions often follow formulaic patterns identifying the individual, their father, and sometimes their tribe or profession.
- Temple and dedication inscriptions with dedications to gods (e.g. Bel, Baalshamin) or construction work in temples
- Honorific inscriptions commemorated individuals who contributed to the city’s civic or religious life.
- Tesserae are small inscribed tokens, understood to have served as admission tokens or ritual markers connected with temple banquets and religious festivals.

== Gallery ==
=== In situ ===
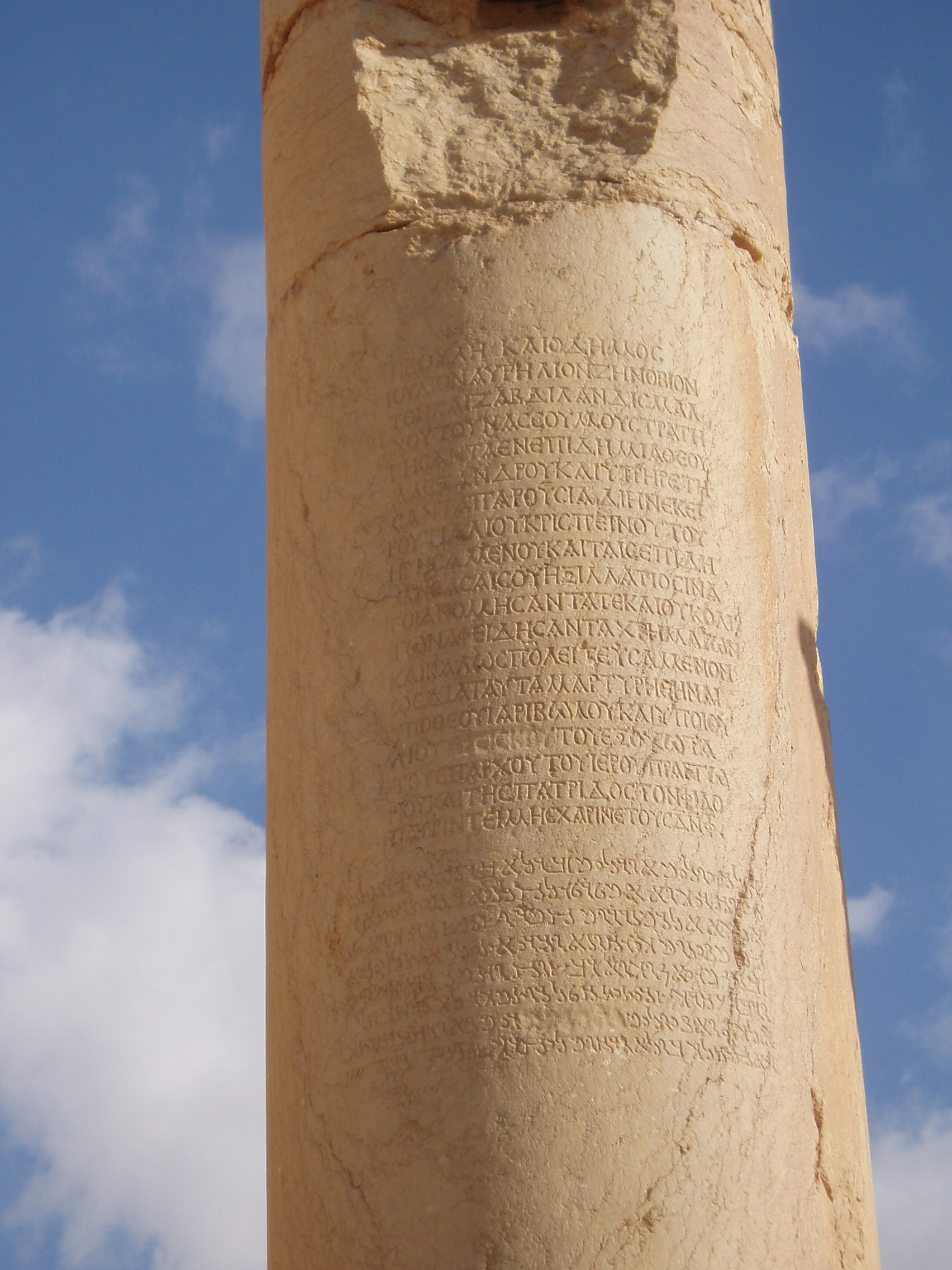
From the Great Colonnade at Palmyra: CIS II 3932, PAT 0278, NE p.459 a5, XXXVII, RES 841, IIP 3 22

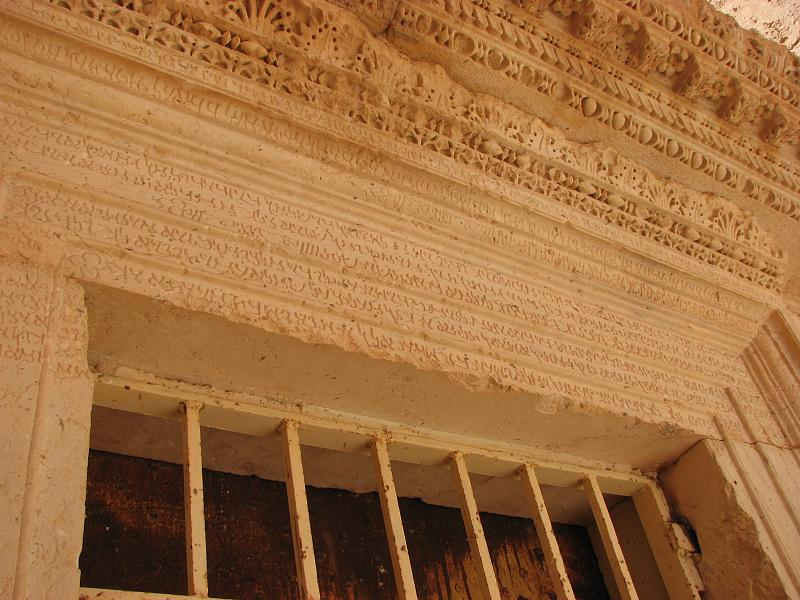
From the Hypogeum of the Three Brothers: CIS II 4171-86, PAT 0523-0542, Tad 27, RES 1041

=== In museums ===
Rome 1 - the first published Palmyrene inscription

Rome 2 - the second published Palmyrene inscription

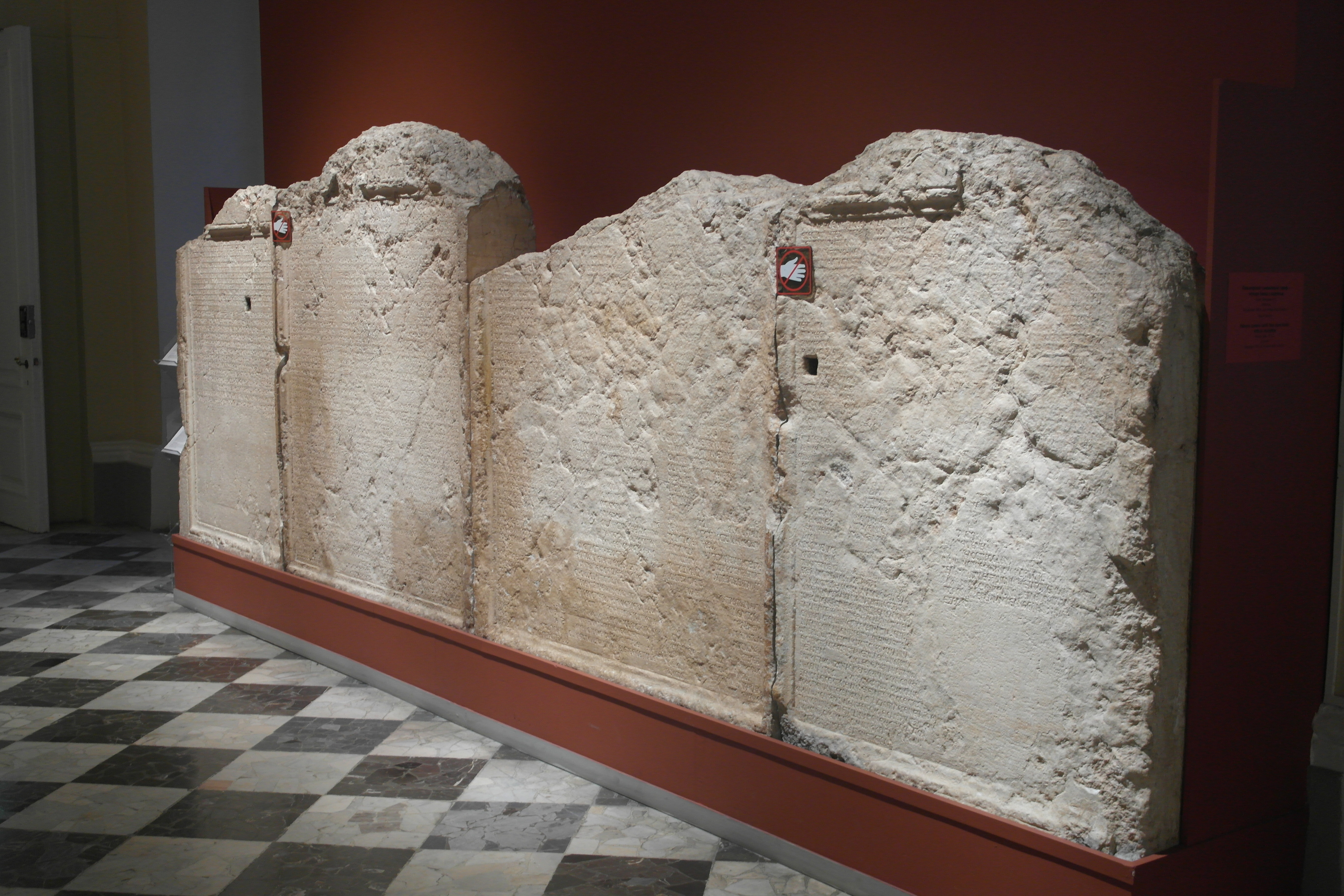
Palmyra Tariff

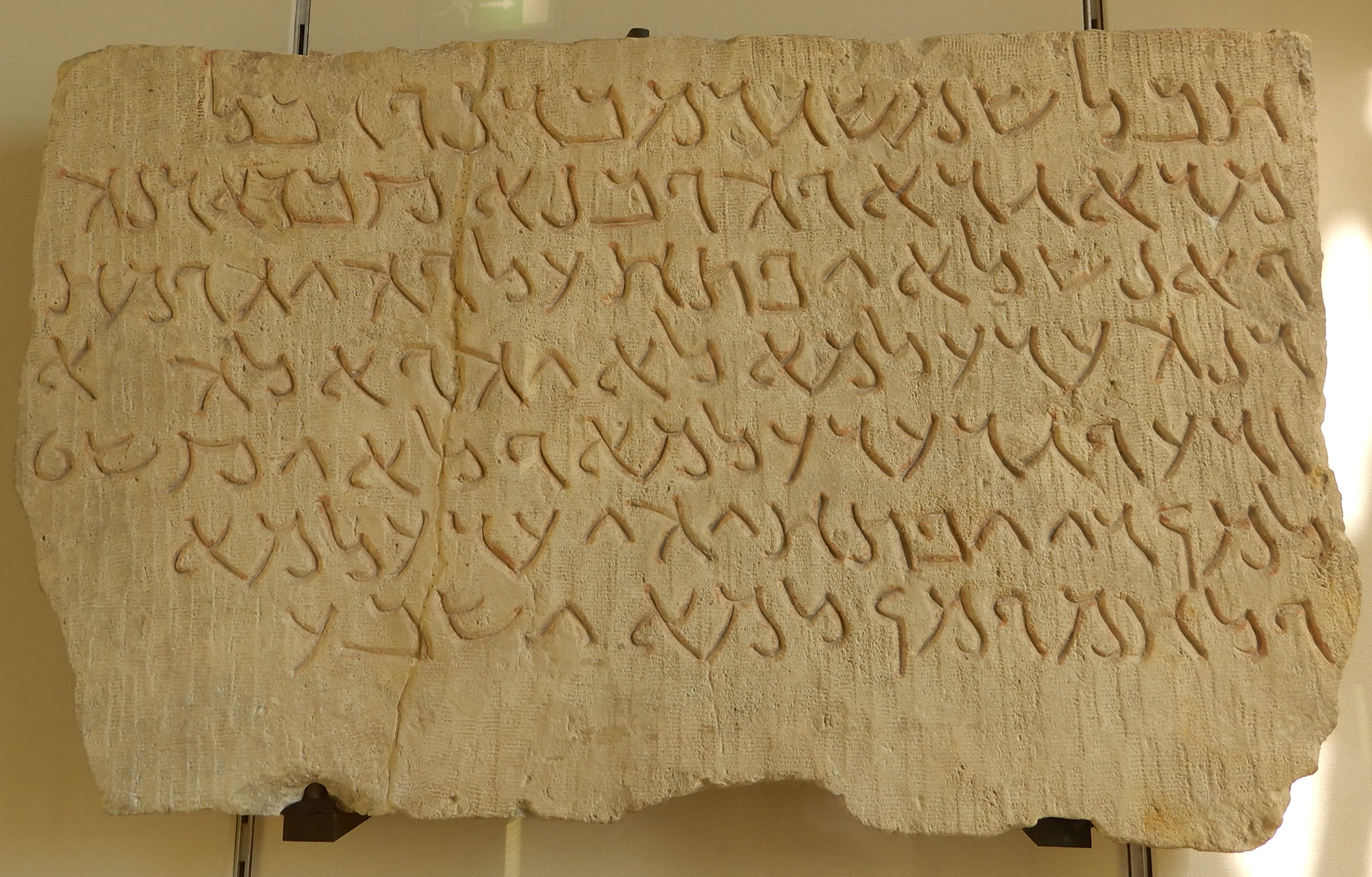
Louvre AO 2204, CIS II 4218

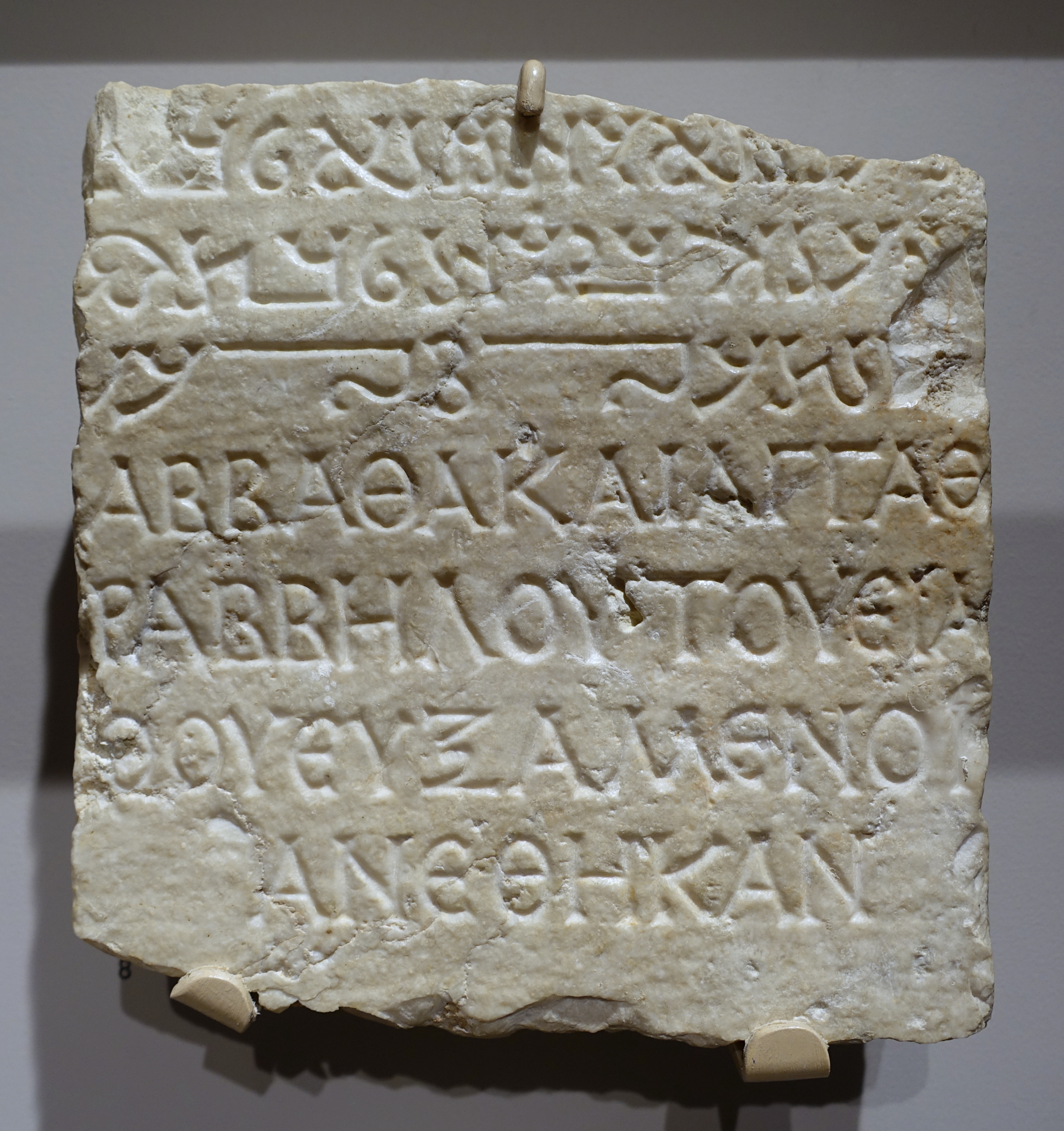
Harvard Semitic Museum 1905.5.33

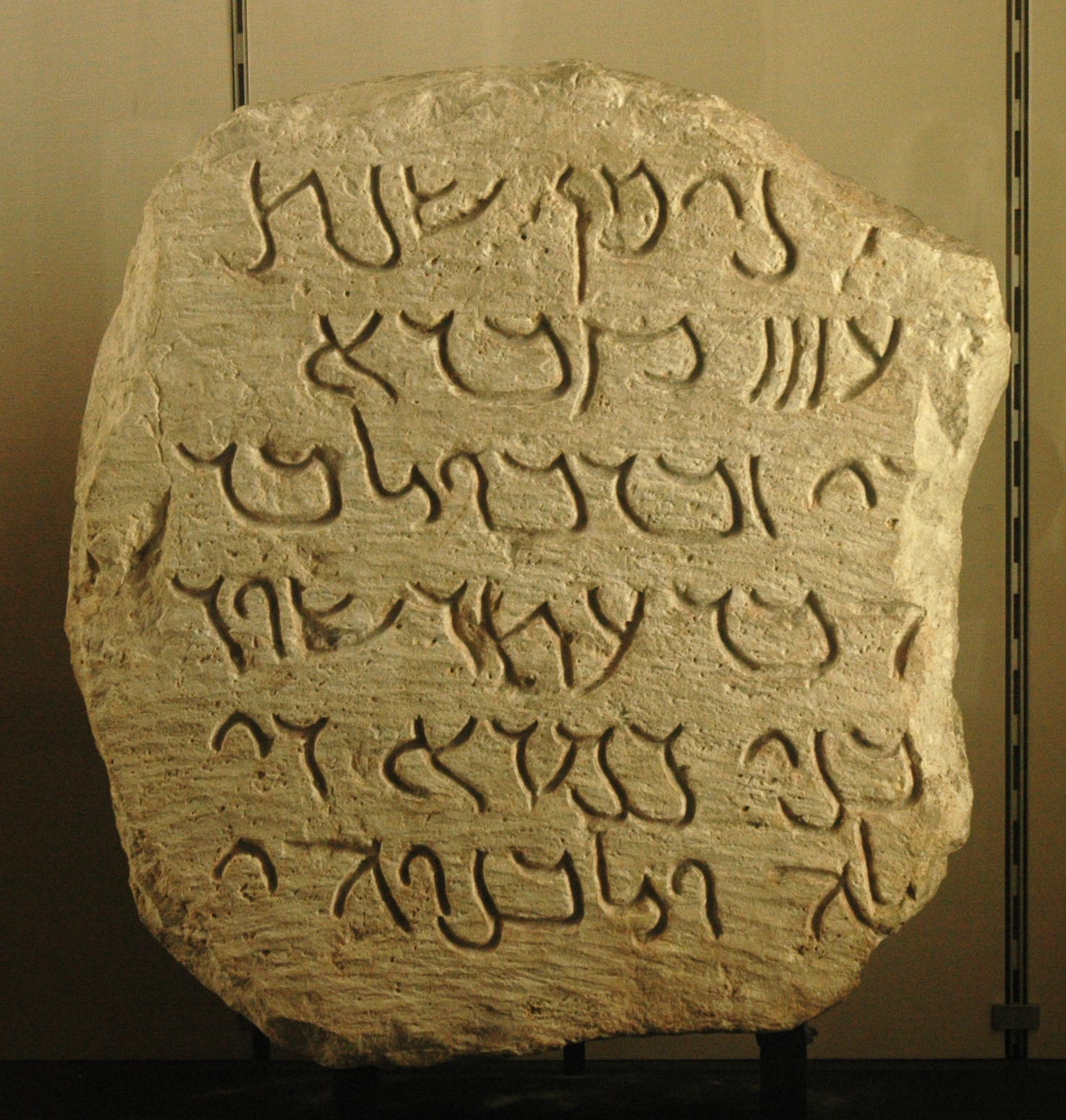
Louvre AO2205, CIS II 4112

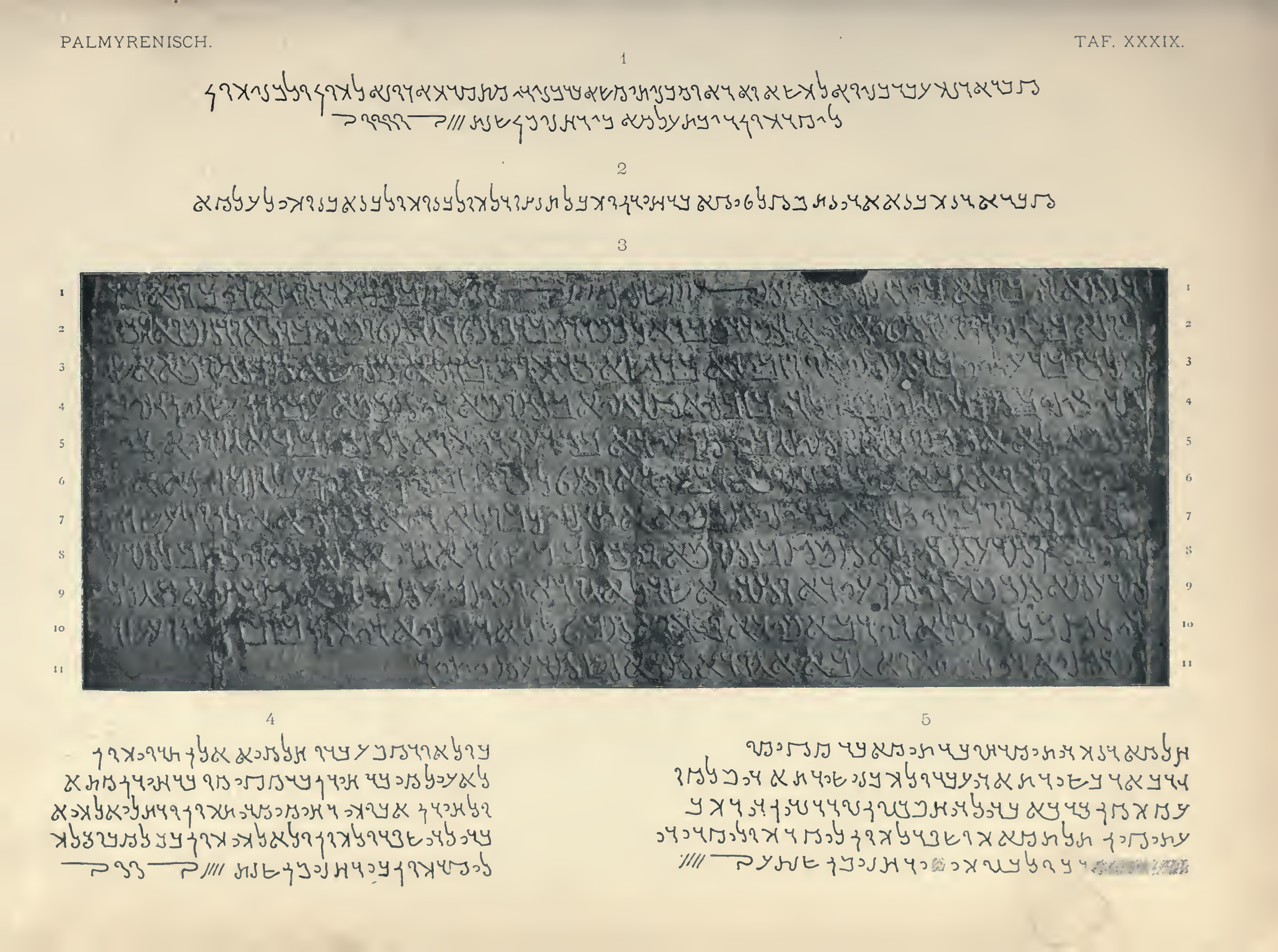
Mark Lidzbarski's Handbuch der Nordsemitischen Epigraphik Table XXXIX

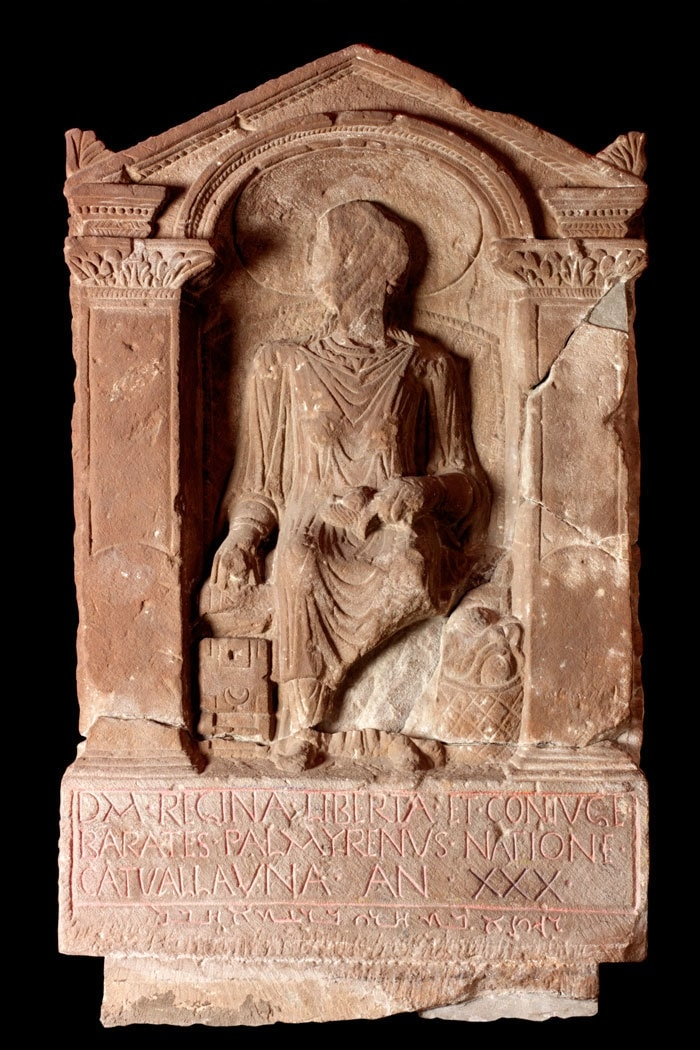
Tombstone of Regina, from Hadrian's Wall, England

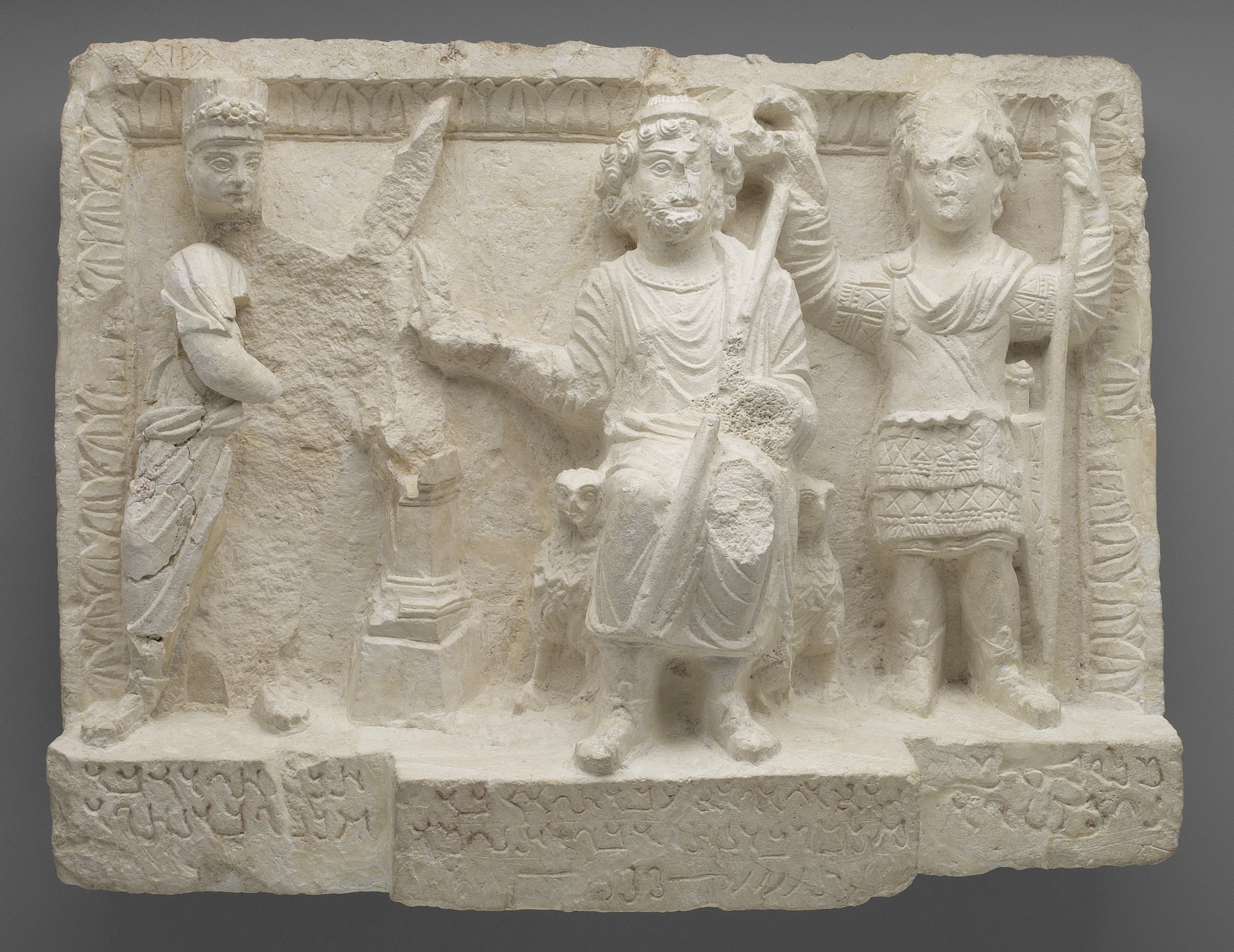
Yale University Art Gallery, 1938.5314, with PAT sigla "Doura 28-32"

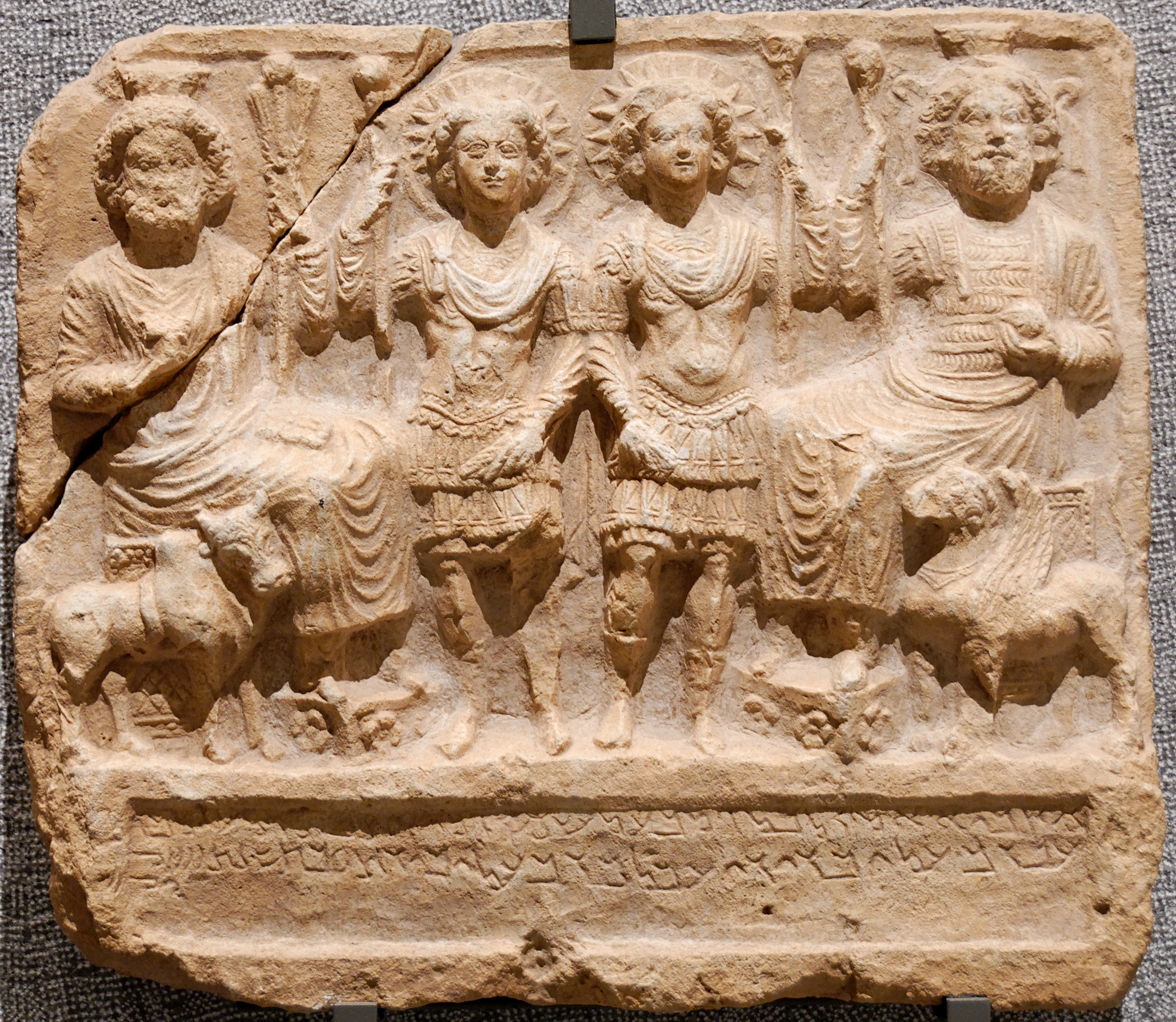
Museum of Fine Arts of Lyon, Inv. 1992-13

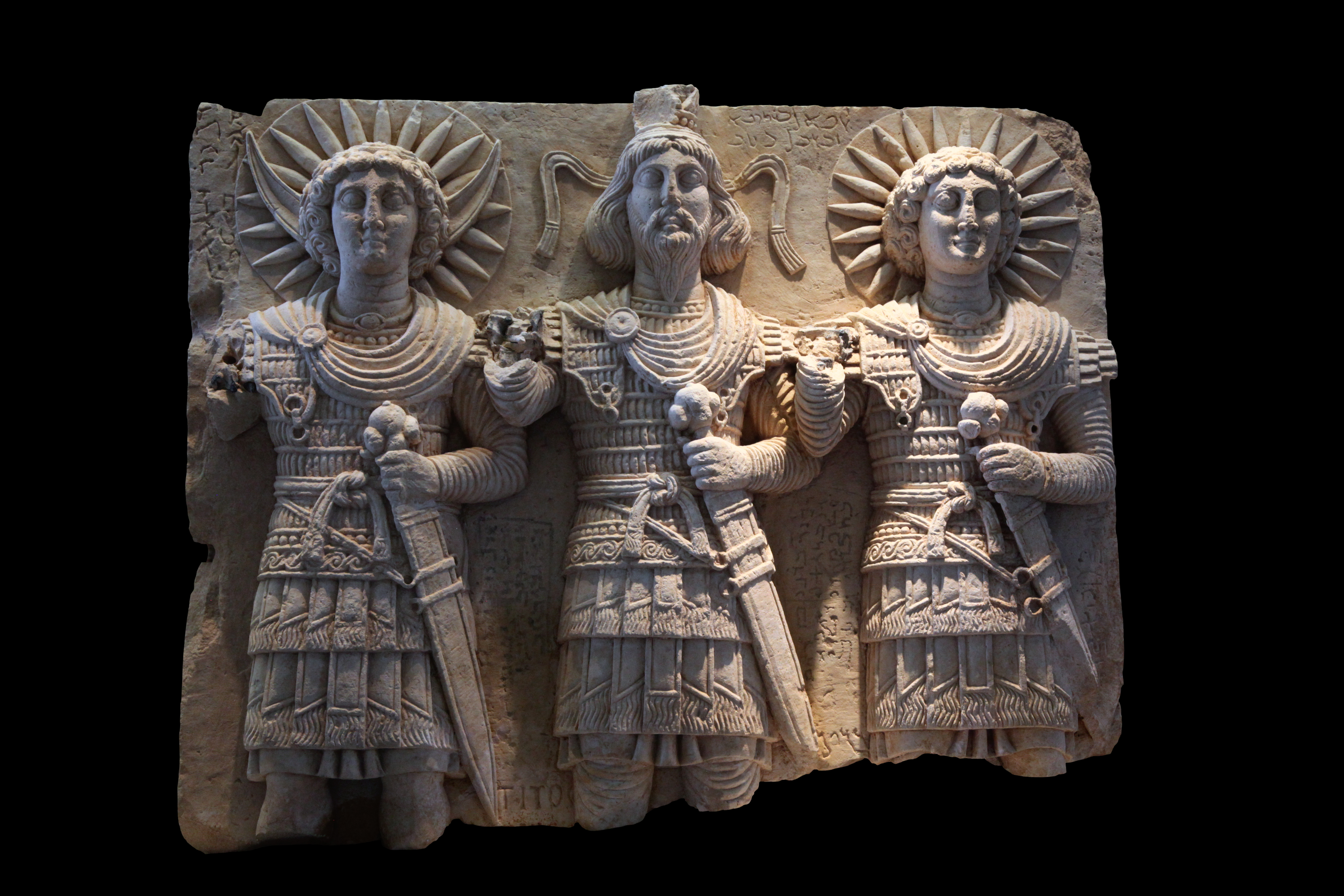
Louvre, AO 19801, with PAT sigla "Syr ’49 p 36-40"

=== Funerary reliefs ===
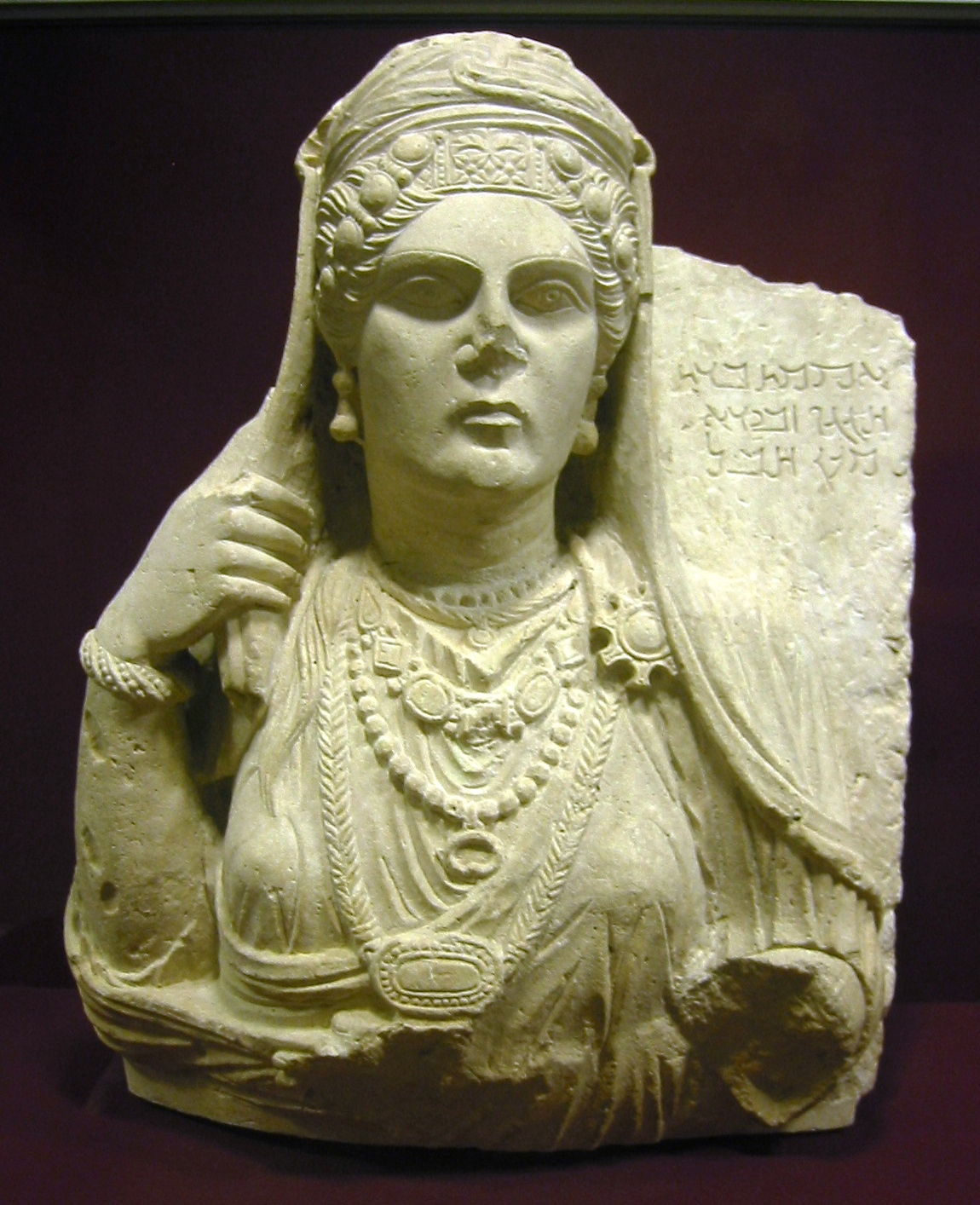
British Museum, 102612, CIS II 4200

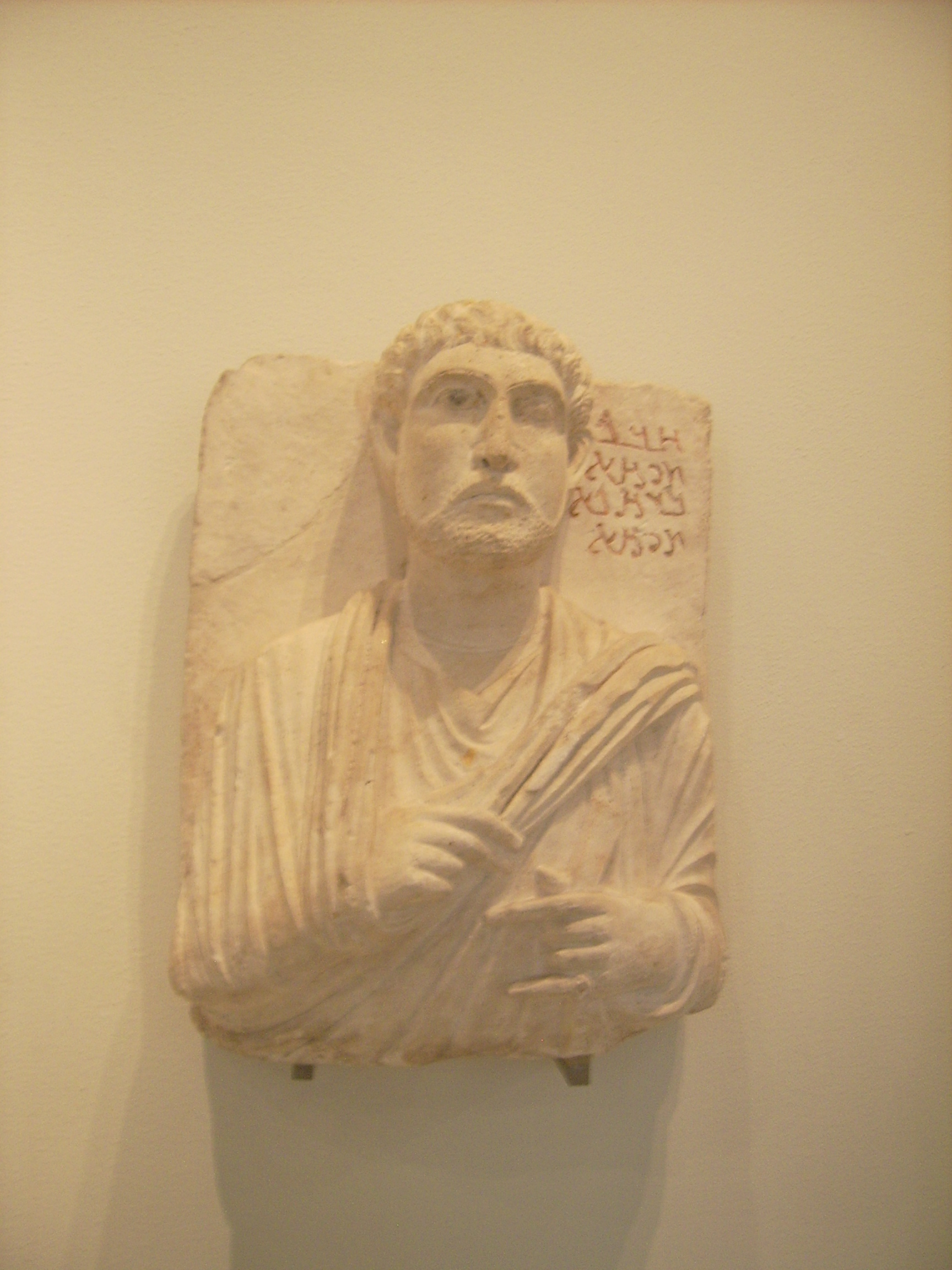
Berlin

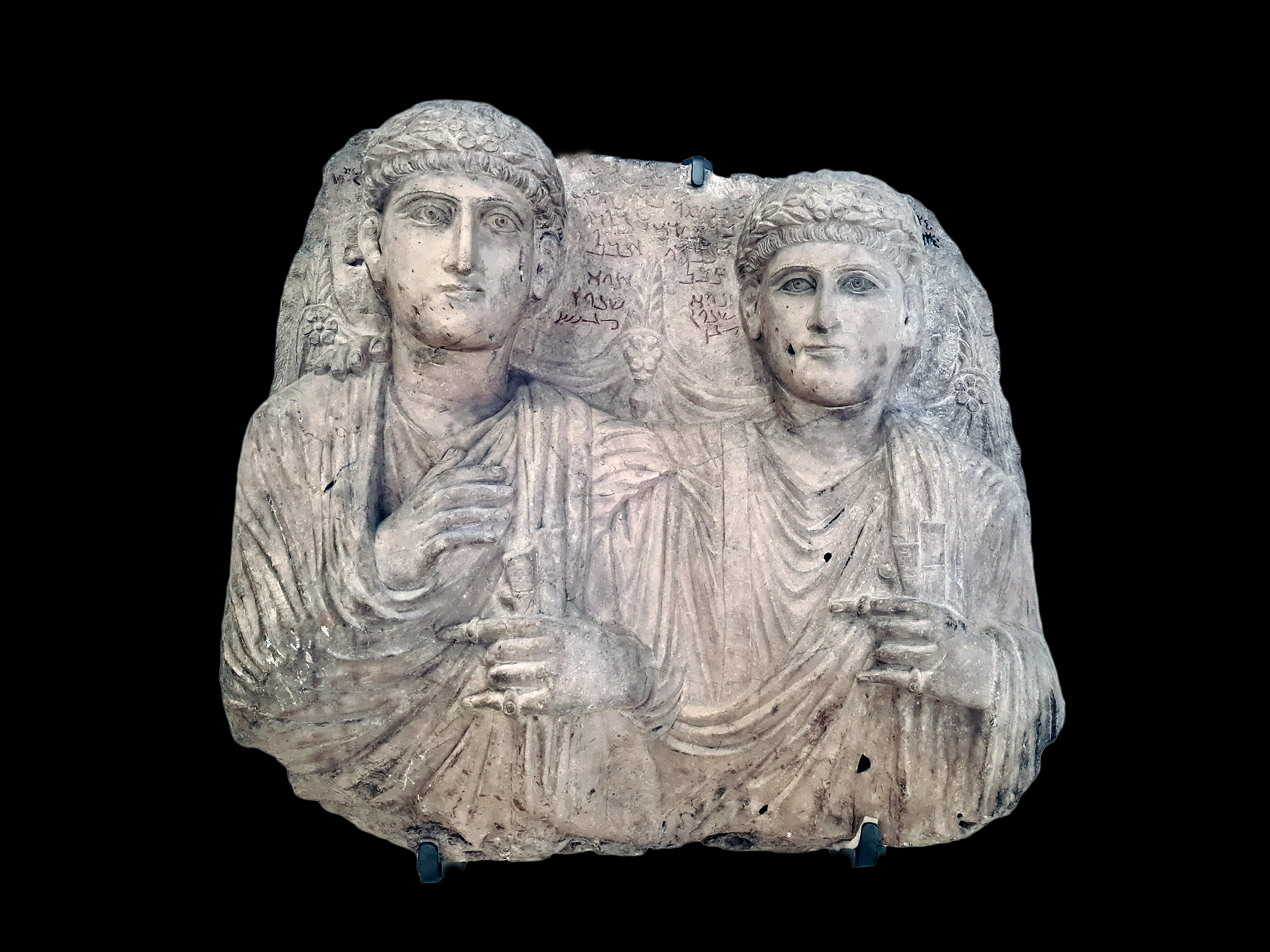
Damascus

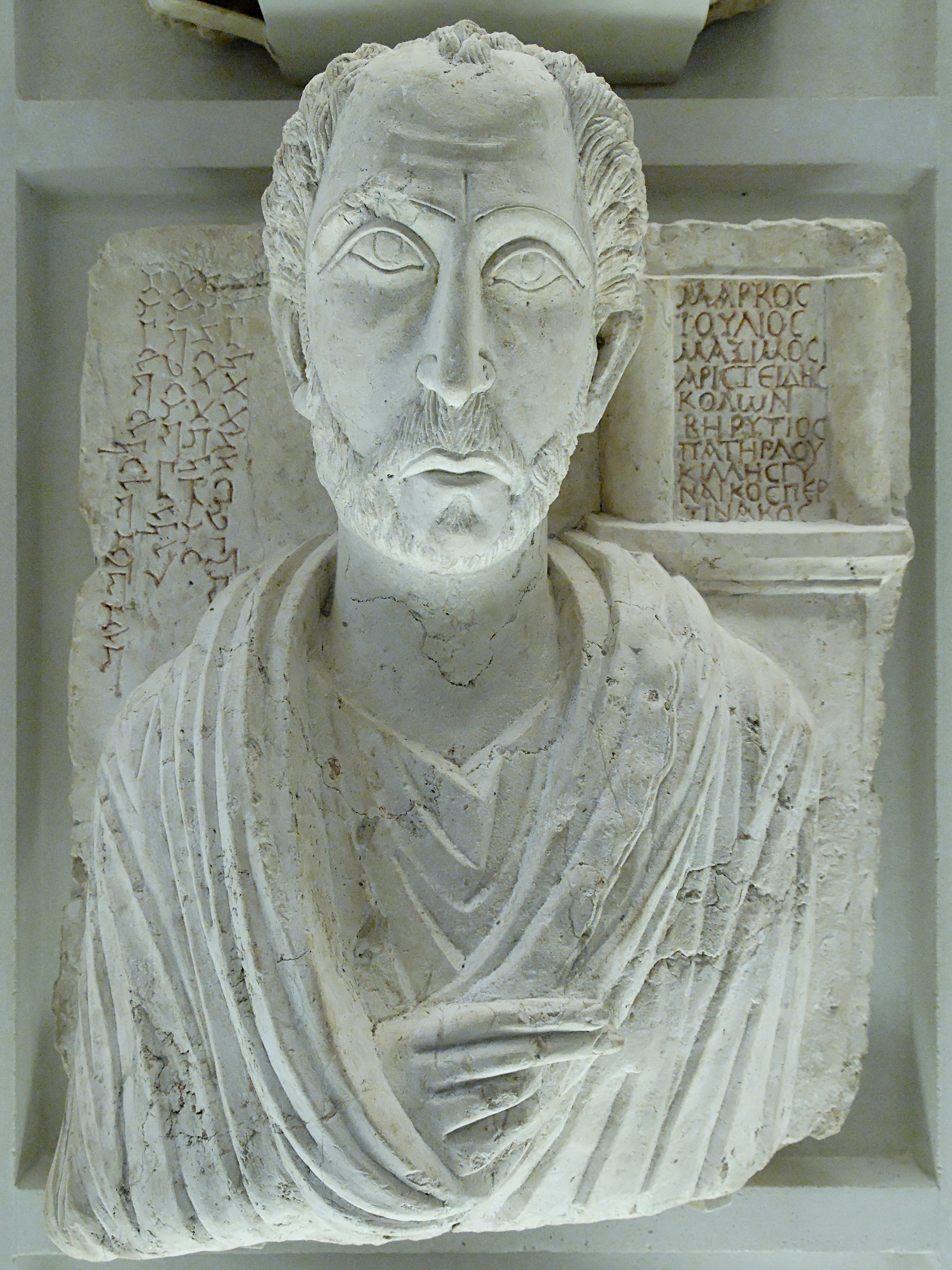
Louvre AO1556, CIS II 4401

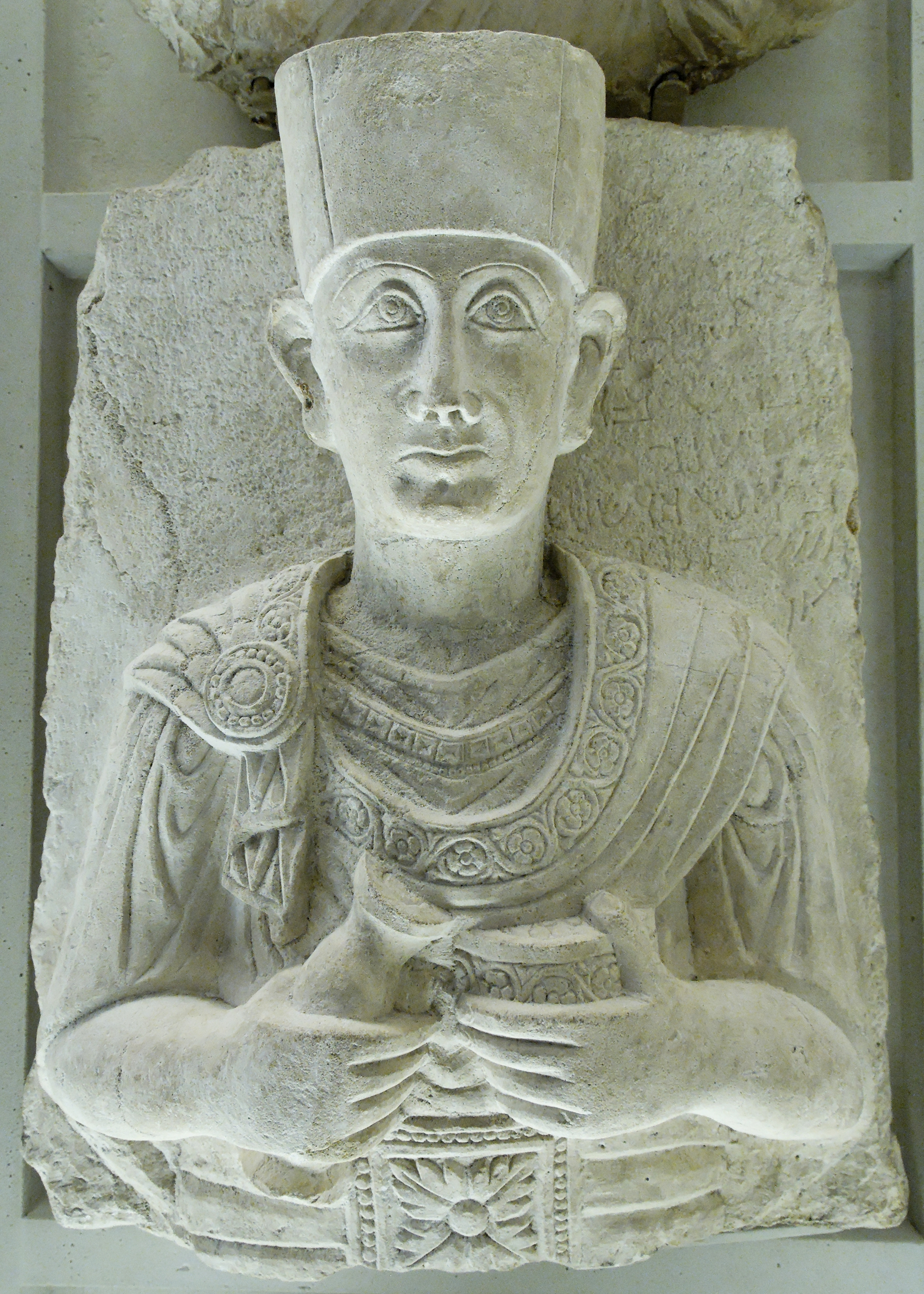
Louvre AO2200, CIS II 4250

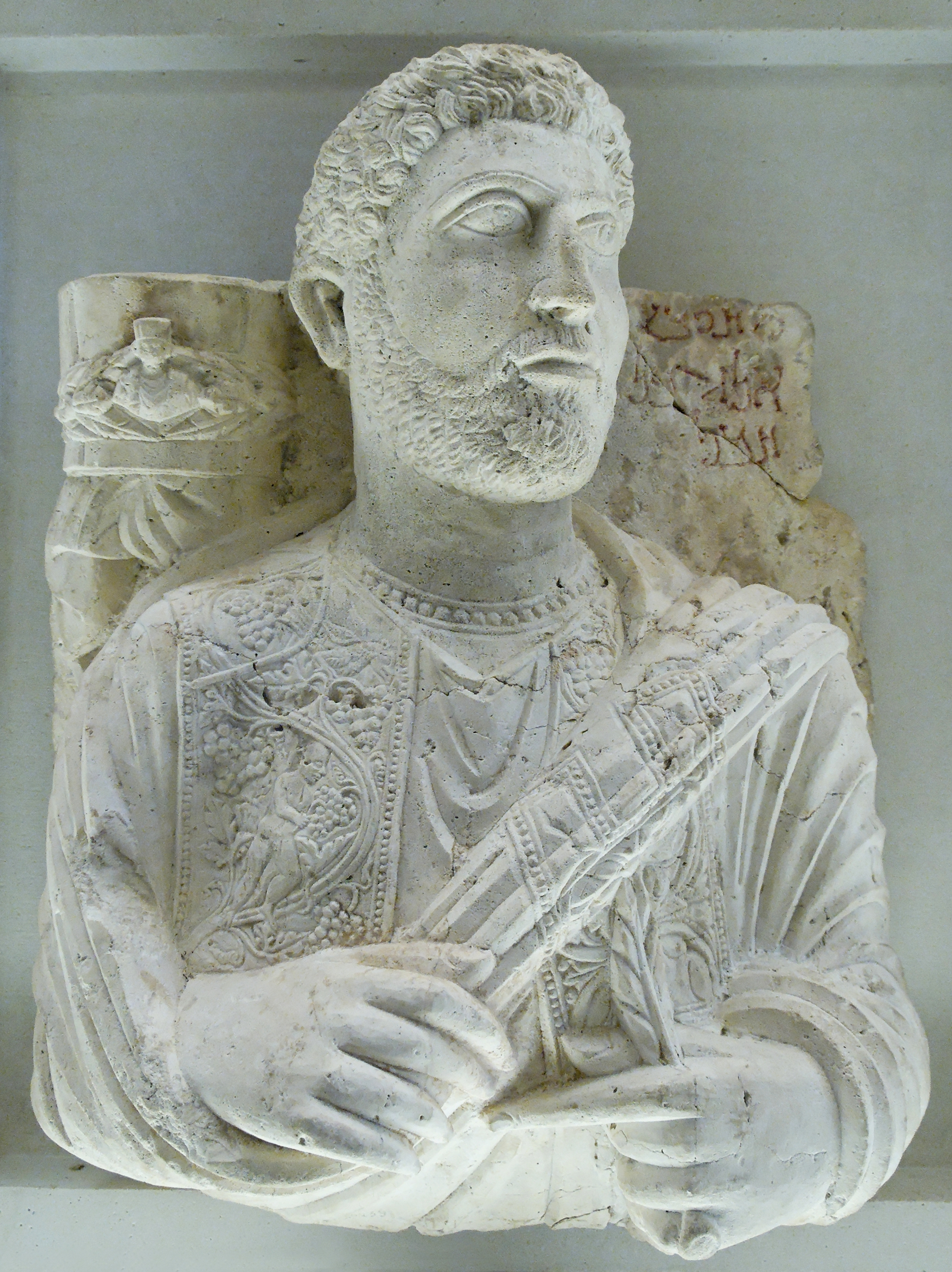
Louvre AO2398, CIS II 4381

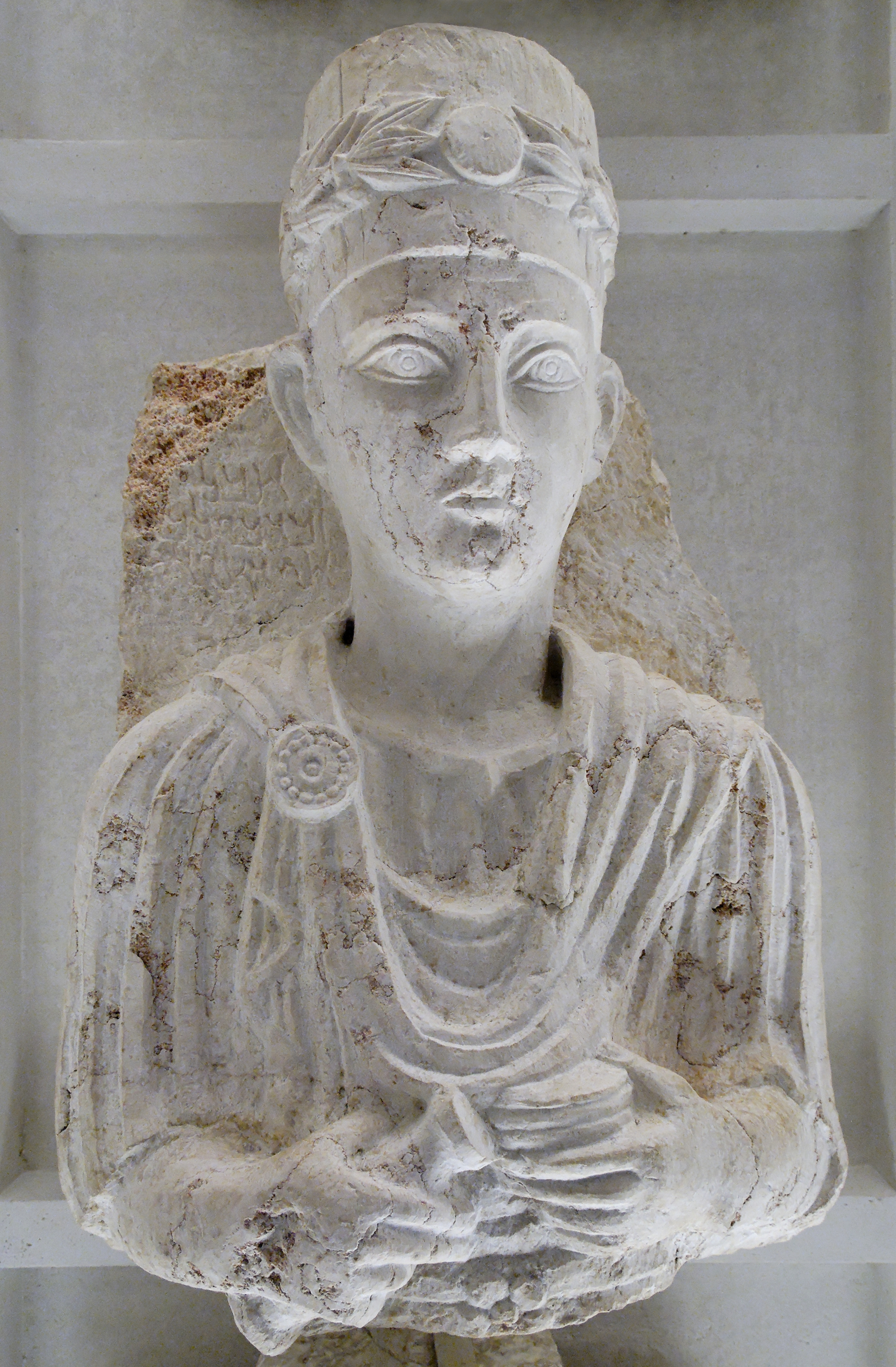
Louvre AO4085, CIS II 4465

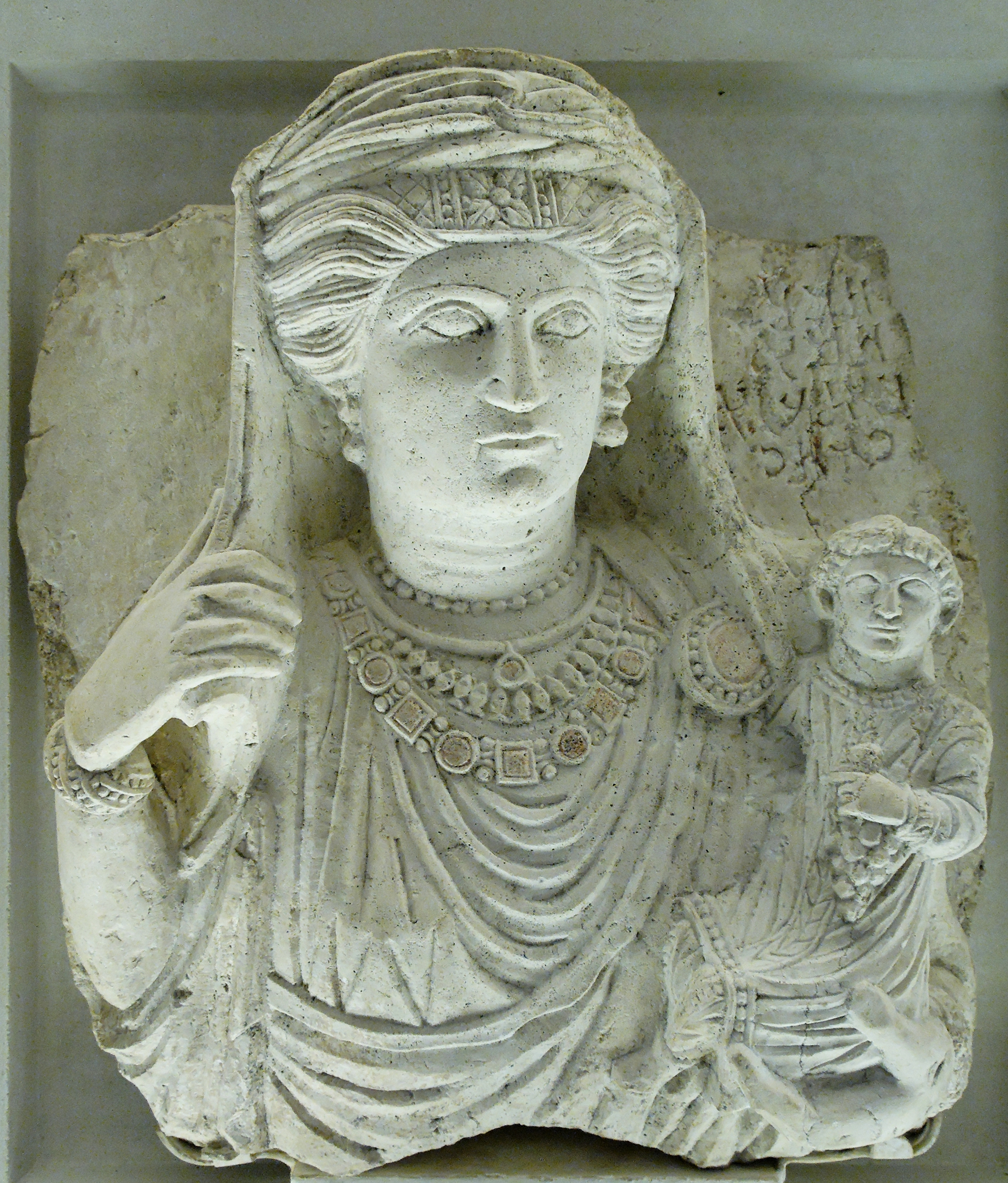
Louvre AO4147, CIS II 4538, IIP 4 27o

== Museum holdings ==
About 1,200 of the inscriptions in PAT are known from museum collections. Many of the others are still in situ.

Museum / Location	Museum Entry	PAT Sigla
Amherst, Mass. – Mead Art Museum	1942.78	PS no. 493
Baghdad – Iraq Museum	66457	Sumer ’62 p
Baghdad – Iraq Museum	51100	Sumer ’62 p 63
Baghdad – Iraq Museum	67810	Sumer ’64 p
Baghdad – Iraq Museum	67815	Sumer ’64 p
Baghdad – Iraq Museum	67806	Sumer ’64 p 13
Baghdad – Iraq Museum	67808	Sumer ’64 p 15
Baghdad – Iraq Museum	67814	Sumer ’64 p 16
Baghdad – Iraq Museum	67809	Sumer ’64 p 17
Baghdad – Iraq Museum	67811	Sumer ’64 p 18
Baghdad – Iraq Museum	67812	Sumer ’64 p 19
Baghdad – Iraq Museum	67817	Sumer ’64 p 19
Baghdad – Iraq Museum	67807	Sumer ’64 p 20
Baghdad – Iraq Museum	67813	Sumer ’64 p 20
Basel – Antikenmuseum	1906/57	C4386
Beirut – American University Museum	25.1	Ber ’34 p 33
Beirut – American University Museum	32.25	Ber ’34 p 36
Beirut – American University Museum	32.56	Ber ’34 p 38
Beirut – American University Museum	33.12	Ber ’34 p 40
Beirut – American University Museum	2740	C4248
Beirut – American University Museum	2739	C4254
Beirut – American University Museum	2733	C4256
Beirut – American University Museum	2732	C4272
Beirut – American University Museum	2737	C4275
Beirut – American University Museum	2734	C4278
Beirut – American University Museum	30.11	C4317
Beirut – American University Museum	2738	C4363
Beirut – American University Museum	2763	C4420
Beirut – American University Museum	2745	C4564
Beirut – American University Museum	2742	C4565
Beirut – American University Museum	2754	C4566
Beirut – American University Museum	2748	C4567
Beirut – American University Museum	2753	C4568
Beirut – Musée National	520	Ber ’36 p 88
Beirut – Musée National	2614	BMB ’55 p 30
Beirut – Musée National	692	BMB ’55 p 33
Beirut – Musée National	589	BMB ’55 p 34
Beirut – Musée National	696	BMB ’55 p 34
Beirut – Musée National	506	BMB ’55 p 35
Beirut – Musée National	587	BMB ’55 p 36
Beirut – Musée National	514	BMB ’55 p 38
Beirut – Musée National	701	BMB ’55 p 38
Beirut – Musée National	2625	BMB ’55 p 41
Beirut – Musée National	2626	BMB ’55 p 41
Beirut – Musée National	515	BMB ’55 p 42
Beirut – Musée National	689	BMB ’55 p 43
Beirut – Musée National	516	C4406
Belgrade – National Museum	—	PS no. 244A
Berlin – Staatliche Museen	VA 3032	C4268
Berlin – Staatliche Museen	VA 2660	C4301
Berlin – Staatliche Museen	VA 51	C4382
Berlin – Staatliche Museen	VA 47	C4383
Berlin – Staatliche Museen	VA 50	C4385
Berlin – Staatliche Museen	VA 27/65	C4479
Berlin – Staatliche Museen	VA 2015	C4510
Berlin – Staatliche Museen	VA 2661	C4511
Berlin – Staatliche Museen	VA 3098	C4540
Bloomington, Indiana – University Art Museum	61.16	C4266
Boston – Museum of Fine Arts	10.79	PS no. 193
Boston – Museum of Fine Arts	96.682	PS no. 234
Brussels – Musées Royaux d’Art et d’Histoire	A 1620	C4257
Brussels – Musées Royaux d’Art et d’Histoire	O 3633	C4304
Brussels – Musées Royaux d’Art et d’Histoire	A 1621	C4617
Bucharest – Public Museum	—	C3907
Cabinet des Médailles	TMP	pp. 757–58
Cabinet des Médailles	—	Sem ’73 p 121
Cairo – Egyptian Museum	64738	Maarav ’87 p 72
Cambridge, Mass. – Harvard University Art Museums	1975.41.116	C4291
Cambridge, Mass. – Harvard University Art Museums	1908.3	StSc 149
Cambridge, Mass. – Harvard University Art Museums	593.1941	StSc 151
Canberra – Australian War Memorial	ART 00484	AfO ’53 p 312
Chapel Hill, North Carolina – Ackland Art Museum	79.29.1	PGSc 12
Cincinnati – Cincinnati Art Museum	1958.257	Verm ’81
Copenhagen – Ny Carlsberg Glyptotek	2816	AA ’30 p 192
Copenhagen – Ny Carlsberg Glyptotek	1081	C4008
Copenhagen – Ny Carlsberg Glyptotek	1080	C4074
Copenhagen – Ny Carlsberg Glyptotek	1161	C4089
Copenhagen – Ny Carlsberg Glyptotek	1147	C4133
Copenhagen – Ny Carlsberg Glyptotek	1137	C4188
Copenhagen – Ny Carlsberg Glyptotek	1136	C4189
Copenhagen – Ny Carlsberg Glyptotek	1135	C4211
Copenhagen – Ny Carlsberg Glyptotek	1155	C4247
Copenhagen – Ny Carlsberg Glyptotek	1046	C4280
Copenhagen – Ny Carlsberg Glyptotek	1049	C4281
Copenhagen – Ny Carlsberg Glyptotek	1028	C4283
Copenhagen – Ny Carlsberg Glyptotek	1032	C4285
Copenhagen – Ny Carlsberg Glyptotek	1037	C4286
Copenhagen – Ny Carlsberg Glyptotek	1033	C4298
Copenhagen – Ny Carlsberg Glyptotek	1029	C4318
Copenhagen – Ny Carlsberg Glyptotek	1030	C4320
Copenhagen – Ny Carlsberg Glyptotek	1024	C4322
Copenhagen – Ny Carlsberg Glyptotek	1061	C4325
Copenhagen – Ny Carlsberg Glyptotek	1039	C4332
Copenhagen – Ny Carlsberg Glyptotek	1055	C4341
Copenhagen – Ny Carlsberg Glyptotek	1139	C4343
Copenhagen – Ny Carlsberg Glyptotek	1044	C4344
Copenhagen – Ny Carlsberg Glyptotek	1057	C4354
Copenhagen – Ny Carlsberg Glyptotek	1138	C4355
Copenhagen – Ny Carlsberg Glyptotek	1040	C4357
Copenhagen – Ny Carlsberg Glyptotek	1038	C4360
Copenhagen – Ny Carlsberg Glyptotek	1041	C4361
Copenhagen – Ny Carlsberg Glyptotek	1034	C4364
Copenhagen – Ny Carlsberg Glyptotek	1025	C4365
Copenhagen – Ny Carlsberg Glyptotek	1140	C4366
Copenhagen – Ny Carlsberg Glyptotek	1059	C4367
Copenhagen – Ny Carlsberg Glyptotek	2776	C4369
Copenhagen – Ny Carlsberg Glyptotek	1079	C4374bis
Copenhagen – Ny Carlsberg Glyptotek	1063	C4380
Copenhagen – Ny Carlsberg Glyptotek	1053	C4384
Copenhagen – Ny Carlsberg Glyptotek	1056	C4388
Copenhagen – Ny Carlsberg Glyptotek	1045	C4389
Copenhagen – Ny Carlsberg Glyptotek	1052	C4390
Copenhagen – Ny Carlsberg Glyptotek	1060	C4391
Copenhagen – Ny Carlsberg Glyptotek	1042	C4392
Copenhagen – Ny Carlsberg Glyptotek	1054	C4393
Copenhagen – Ny Carlsberg Glyptotek	1058	C4394
Copenhagen – Ny Carlsberg Glyptotek	1031	C4395
Copenhagen – Ny Carlsberg Glyptotek	1035	C4400
Copenhagen – Ny Carlsberg Glyptotek	1027	C4405
Copenhagen – Ny Carlsberg Glyptotek	1074	C4408
Copenhagen – Ny Carlsberg Glyptotek	1073	C4409
Copenhagen – Ny Carlsberg Glyptotek	1159	C4458
Copenhagen – Ny Carlsberg Glyptotek	1160	C4458bis
Copenhagen – Ny Carlsberg Glyptotek	1064	C4488
Copenhagen – Ny Carlsberg Glyptotek	1062	C4489
Copenhagen – Ny Carlsberg Glyptotek	1065	C4490
Copenhagen – Ny Carlsberg Glyptotek	1050	C4492
Copenhagen – Ny Carlsberg Glyptotek	1072	C4493
Copenhagen – Ny Carlsberg Glyptotek	1051	C4494
Copenhagen – Ny Carlsberg Glyptotek	1077	C4495
Copenhagen – Ny Carlsberg Glyptotek	1078	C4496
Copenhagen – Ny Carlsberg Glyptotek	2774	C4527
Copenhagen – Ny Carlsberg Glyptotek	1146	C4555
Copenhagen – Ny Carlsberg Glyptotek	1146	C4556
Copenhagen – Ny Carlsberg Glyptotek	1043	C4611
Copenhagen – Ny Carlsberg Glyptotek	1036	C4612
Copenhagen – Ny Carlsberg Glyptotek	3727	MUSJ ’62 p 106
Copenhagen – Ny Carlsberg Glyptotek	2833	NyCG 47
Copenhagen – Ny Carlsberg Glyptotek	2775	NyCG 62
Copenhagen – Ny Carlsberg Glyptotek	1043	NyCG 70
Copenhagen – Ny Carlsberg Glyptotek	2763	NyCG 73
Copenhagen – Ny Carlsberg Glyptotek	2794	PS no. 39
Damascus - Musée de l’Armée	SFP 39	SFP p 25
Damascus – National Museum	15028	AAS ’53 p 19
Damascus – National Museum	15027	AAS ’53 p 22
Damascus – National Museum	15020	AAS ’53 p 24
Damascus – National Museum	7459	BS III 57
Damascus – National Museum	164 (248)	C3974
Damascus – National Museum	22	C4243
Damascus – National Museum	9	C4244
Damascus – National Museum	6340 (15029)	C4359
Damascus – National Museum	2	C4414
Damascus – National Museum	7	C4444
Damascus – National Museum	12	C4449
Damascus – National Museum	10	C4464
Damascus – National Museum	21	C4473
Damascus – National Museum	26	C4576
Damascus – National Museum	31	C4589
Damascus – National Museum	15	C4610
Damascus – National Museum	4947 (10941)	CatDam p 123
Damascus – National Museum	4522	CatMD
Damascus – National Museum	5318	CatMD
Damascus – National Museum	8832	CatMD
Damascus – National Museum	10948	Doura 20
Damascus – National Museum	2793 (7864)	EblaDam p 295
Damascus – National Museum	7444	EblaDam p 296
Damascus – National Museum	25	IP 79
Damascus – National Museum	30	IP 80
Damascus – National Museum	32	IP 81
Damascus – National Museum	34	IP 82
Damascus – National Museum	65	IP 83
Damascus – National Museum	245	IP 84
Damascus – National Museum	246	IP 85
Damascus – National Museum	5924	PNO no. 13
Damascus – National Museum	5.925	PNO no. 14
Damascus – National Museum	9023	PNO no. 15
Damascus – National Museum	2844	PNO no. 16
Damascus – National Museum	5921	PNO no. 20
Damascus – National Museum	5069	PNO no. 35
Damascus – National Museum	5070	PNO no. 37
Damascus – National Museum	5215	PNO no. 39
Damascus – National Museum	5115	PNO no. 42
Damascus – National Museum	5922	PNO no. 48
Damascus – National Museum	5917	PNO no. 5
Damascus – National Museum	3841	PNO no. 57
Damascus – National Museum	2842	PNO no. 6
Damascus – National Museum	9014	PNO no. 61
Damascus – National Museum	33	PS no. 141
Damascus – National Museum	39	PS no. 143
Damascus – National Museum	18.802	RSP 11
Damascus – National Museum	18.797	RSP 16
Damascus – National Museum	4480	Syr ’33 p 179
Damascus – National Museum	4834	Syr ’33 p 181
Damascus – National Museum	331	Syr ’37 pp 31, 33 fig 20
Damascus – National Museum	12875	Syr ’49 p 249
Dresden – Staatliche Skulpturensammlung	ZV 846	C4300
Dresden – Staatliche Skulpturensammlung	ZV 845	C4506
Erlangen – Archäologisches Institut der Universität	I 1156	C4461
Erlangen – Archäologisches Institut der Universität	I 1184	C4569
Geneva – Musée d’Art et d’Histoire	8195	C4265
Geneva – Musée d’Art et d’Histoire	8191	C4270
Geneva – Musée d’Art et d’Histoire	8188	C4277
Geneva – Musée d’Art et d’Histoire	8194	C4309
Geneva – Musée d’Art et d’Histoire	8194	C4310
Geneva – Musée d’Art et d’Histoire	8196	C4430
Geneva – Musée d’Art et d’Histoire	8193	C4431
Geneva – Musée d’Art et d’Histoire	19806	MélColl p 161
Grenoble – Musée des Beaux-Arts	1582	C4397
Havana – Museo Nacional de l'Havana	—	C4290
Institut Catholique – Musée Bible et Terre Sainte	—	Déd p 217
Istanbul – Arkeoloji Müzesi	3711 T?	C3929
Istanbul – Arkeoloji Müzesi	160	C3976
Istanbul – Arkeoloji Müzesi	3703 T	C4020
Istanbul – Arkeoloji Müzesi	3704 T	C4063
Istanbul – Arkeoloji Müzesi	3708 T	C4077
Istanbul – Arkeoloji Müzesi	3759 T	C4131
Istanbul – Arkeoloji Müzesi	3716 T	C4191
Istanbul – Arkeoloji Müzesi	3742 T	C4195
Istanbul – Arkeoloji Müzesi	3822 T	C4264
Istanbul – Arkeoloji Müzesi	3747 T	C4274
Istanbul – Arkeoloji Müzesi	3837 T	C4299
Istanbul – Arkeoloji Müzesi	3758 T	C4303
Istanbul – Arkeoloji Müzesi	3783 T	C4306
Istanbul – Arkeoloji Müzesi	3713 T	C4345
Istanbul – Arkeoloji Müzesi	3712 T	C4346
Istanbul – Arkeoloji Müzesi	3719 T	C4347
Istanbul – Arkeoloji Müzesi	3714 T	C4348
Istanbul – Arkeoloji Müzesi	3715 T	C4350
Istanbul – Arkeoloji Müzesi	3750 T	C4416
Istanbul – Arkeoloji Müzesi	3753 T	C4419
Istanbul – Arkeoloji Müzesi	3725 T	C4421
Istanbul – Arkeoloji Müzesi	3745 T	C4422
Istanbul – Arkeoloji Müzesi	3730 T	C4423
Istanbul – Arkeoloji Müzesi	3801 T	C4424
Istanbul – Arkeoloji Müzesi	3828 T	C4427
Istanbul – Arkeoloji Müzesi	3794 T	C4429
Istanbul – Arkeoloji Müzesi	3749 T	C4447
Istanbul – Arkeoloji Müzesi	3839 T	C4471
Istanbul – Arkeoloji Müzesi	3816 T	C4476
Istanbul – Arkeoloji Müzesi	3740 T	C4512
Istanbul – Arkeoloji Müzesi	3741 T	C4513
Istanbul – Arkeoloji Müzesi	3743 T	C4514
Istanbul – Arkeoloji Müzesi	3744 T	C4515
Istanbul – Arkeoloji Müzesi	3748 T	C4516
Istanbul – Arkeoloji Müzesi	575	C4517
Istanbul – Arkeoloji Müzesi	3751 T	C4518
Istanbul – Arkeoloji Müzesi	3808 T	C4534
Istanbul – Arkeoloji Müzesi	3746 T	C4586
Istanbul – Arkeoloji Müzesi	3824 T?	C4590
Istanbul – Arkeoloji Müzesi	3824 T	C4591
Istanbul – Arkeoloji Müzesi	3820 T	C4600
Istanbul – Arkeoloji Müzesi	3796 T	C4601
Istanbul – Arkeoloji Müzesi	3821 T	C4602
Istanbul – Arkeoloji Müzesi	3823 T	C4603
Istanbul – Arkeoloji Müzesi	3805 T	C4604
Istanbul – Arkeoloji Müzesi	3818 T	C4605
Istanbul – Arkeoloji Müzesi	3784 T?	C4606
Istanbul – Arkeoloji Müzesi	3840 T	C4616
Istanbul – Arkeoloji Müzesi	3833 T	C4622
Jerusalem - Albright Institute	—	BJPES ’47 p 146
Jerusalem - Bible Land Museum	BLMJ 2587	Sem ’74 p 69
Jerusalem - Musée biblique de Bethesda	PB 2669	C4276
Jerusalem - Musée biblique de Bethesda	PB 2670	C4329
Jerusalem - Studium Biblicum Franciscanum	—	C4450
Jerusalem - Studium Biblicum Franciscanum	—	C4451
Leiden – Rijksmuseum van Oudheden	B 1977/4.1	OM ’88 p 37
London – British Museum	125025	C3912
London – British Museum	125206	C3972
London – British Museum	1250	C4118
London – British Museum	102612	C4200
London – British Museum	125038	C4282
London – British Museum	125201	C4288
London – British Museum	125036	C4296
London – British Museum	125032	C4297
London – British Museum	125020	C4323
London – British Museum	125202	C4324
London – British Museum	125019	C4326
London – British Museum	125203	C4335
London – British Museum	(580)	C4337
London – British Museum	125024	C4338
London – British Museum	125048	C4356
London – British Museum	125695	C4374
London – British Museum	104460	C4404
London – British Museum	125156	C4432
London – British Museum	125125	C4433
London – British Museum	125150	C4507
London – British Museum	125204	C4508
London – British Museum	125017	C4509
London – British Museum	125031	C4580
London – British Museum	125023	C4581
Los Angeles – County Museum of Art	M.79.147	C4570
Mainz – Prinz Johann Georg Sammlung	835	C4245
Mainz – Prinz Johann Georg Sammlung	834	C4417
Mainz – Prinz Johann Georg Sammlung	833	C4437
Mainz – Prinz Johann Georg Sammlung	721	C4474
Malibu – J. Paul Getty Museum	88.AA.50 no. 40	Soth 5518
Mentana (Rome) – Federico Zeri Collection	—	AIΩN ’86a p 246
Mentana (Rome) – Federico Zeri Collection	—	AIΩN ’86a p 247
Mentana (Rome) – Federico Zeri Collection	—	AIΩN ’86a p 247
Mentana (Rome) – Federico Zeri Collection	—	AIΩN ’86b p 231
Mentana (Rome) – Federico Zeri Collection	AIΩN ’86a p 248	C4587
Milan – Vitali Collection	—	C4459
Minneapolis – Minneapolis Institute of Art	—	C4571
Morris, N.Y. – Frederick A. Godley Collection	—	YCS ’55 p 177
Mosul – Dominican Friars	—	Syr ’63 p 48
Munich – Glyptotek König Ludwigs I	Gl. 469	C4593
New Haven - Beinecke Library	Inv. D.Pg. 35	PDura 152
New Haven – Yale University Art Gallery	1954.30.1	C4547
New Haven – Yale University Art Gallery	1954.30.2	C4548
New Haven – Yale University Art Gallery	1954.30.3	C4549
New Haven – Yale University Art Gallery	1954.30.4	C4550
New Haven – Yale University Art Gallery	1938.5312	Doura 12
New Haven – Yale University Art Gallery	1935.97	Doura 19
New Haven – Yale University Art Gallery	1935.45	Doura 23
New Haven – Yale University Art Gallery	1938.5314	Doura 28
New Haven – Yale University Art Gallery	1938.5314	Doura 29
New Haven – Yale University Art Gallery	1938.5314	Doura 30
New Haven – Yale University Art Gallery	1938.5314	Doura 31
New Haven – Yale University Art Gallery	1938.5314	Doura 32
New Haven – Yale University Art Gallery	1938.5301	Doura 33
New Haven – Yale University Art Gallery	1938.5304	Doura 34
New Haven – Yale University Art Gallery	1938.5311	Doura 47
New Haven – Yale University Art Gallery	1930.6	PGSc 13
New York – Metropolitan Museum of Art	MMA 95.28	C4030
New York – Metropolitan Museum of Art	MMA 98.19.1	C4117
New York – Metropolitan Museum of Art	MMA 02.29.3	C4258
New York – Metropolitan Museum of Art	MMA 02.29.1	C4259
New York – Metropolitan Museum of Art	MMA 02.29.5	C4260
New York – Metropolitan Museum of Art	MMA 02.29.6	C4261
New York – Metropolitan Museum of Art	MMA 02.29.4	C4263
New York – Metropolitan Museum of Art	—	C4316
New York – Metropolitan Museum of Art	MMA 98.19.3	C4327
New York – Metropolitan Museum of Art	MMA 98.19.2	C4328
New York – Metropolitan Museum of Art	MMA 98.19.4	C4330
New York – Metropolitan Museum of Art	MMA 01.25.2	C4519
New York – Metropolitan Museum of Art	MMA 01.25.3	C4551
New York – Metropolitan Museum of Art	MMA 01.25.5	C4552
New York – Metropolitan Museum of Art	MMA L 1994.1	C4560
Omaha – Joslyn Art Museum	1960.266	C4598
Oslo – National Gallery	—	C4307
Oslo – National Gallery	—	C4308
Oslo – National Gallery	—	C4314
Oxford – Ashmolean Museum	1976.187	C3910
Oxford – Ashmolean Museum	C2-9	C3978
Oxford – Ashmolean Museum	C2-10	C4021
Oxford – Ashmolean Museum	C2-11	C4031
Palmyra Museum	B 10/63	AAS ’65/2 p 127
Palmyra Museum	A 453	Ber ’36 p 94
Palmyra Museum	A 281	Ber ’36 p 97
Palmyra Museum	519	Ber ’36 p 99
Palmyra Museum	exc no. 57	BS III 1
Palmyra Museum	exc no. 283	BS III 10
Palmyra Museum	exc no. 277	BS III 11
Palmyra Museum	exc no. 27	BS III 12
Palmyra Museum	exc no. 287	BS III 14
Palmyra Museum	exc no. 288	BS III 15
Palmyra Museum	exc no. 346	BS III 16
Palmyra Museum	exc no. 116	BS III 17
Palmyra Museum	exc no. 282	BS III 18
Palmyra Museum	exc no. 87	BS III 19
Palmyra Museum	exc no. 96,129,254,278,161	BS III 2
Palmyra Museum	exc no. 203	BS III 20
Palmyra Museum	exc no. 89	BS III 21
Palmyra Museum	exc no. 88	BS III 22
Palmyra Museum	exc no. 110	BS III 23
Palmyra Museum	exc no. 15	BS III 24
Palmyra Museum	exc no. 231	BS III 26
Palmyra Museum	A 1303	BS III 27
Palmyra Museum	A 1271	BS III 28
Palmyra Museum	exc no. 341	BS III 29
Palmyra Museum	exc no. 42	BS III 3
Palmyra Museum	A 1268	BS III 32
Palmyra Museum	exc no. 200	BS III 33
Palmyra Museum	exc no. 99	BS III 34
Palmyra Museum	exc no. 156	BS III 35
Palmyra Museum	A 1290 + A 1294	BS III 36
Palmyra Museum	exc no. 272	BS III 37
Palmyra Museum	exc no. 8	BS III 38
Palmyra Museum	exc no. 4	BS III 39
Palmyra Museum	exc no. 302	BS III 4
Palmyra Museum	exc no. 30	BS III 40
Palmyra Museum	A 1285	BS III 41
Palmyra Museum	exc no. 16	BS III 42
Palmyra Museum	exc no. 135	BS III 43
Palmyra Museum	exc no. 134	BS III 45
Palmyra Museum	exc no. 44	BS III 46
Palmyra Museum	exc no. 160	BS III 47
Palmyra Museum	exc no. 90,132,227	BS III 5
Palmyra Museum	exc no. 19	BS III 51
Palmyra Museum	A 1310	BS III 53
Palmyra Museum	A 1280, A 1273	BS III 54
Palmyra Museum	A 1274	BS III 55
Palmyra Museum	B 1864	BS III 56
Palmyra Museum	A 1285	BS III 58
Palmyra Museum	exc no. 262	BS III 59
Palmyra Museum	exc no. 41	BS III 6
Palmyra Museum	A 1302	BS III 60
Palmyra Museum	B 1896	BS III 62
Palmyra Museum	A 1277	BS III 63
Palmyra Museum	B 1903	BS III 64
Palmyra Museum	A 1297	BS III 65
Palmyra Museum	A 1309	BS III 66
Palmyra Museum	A 1298	BS III 67
Palmyra Museum	exc no. 86	BS III 68
Palmyra Museum	exc no. 85	BS III 69
Palmyra Museum	exc no. 109	BS III 7
Palmyra Museum	exc no. 216	BS III 70
Palmyra Museum	exc no. 87	BS III 71
Palmyra Museum	exc no. 87	BS III 72
Palmyra Museum	exc no. 273	BS III 73
Palmyra Museum	A 1279	BS III 79
Palmyra Museum	exc no. 76 + 45	BS III 8
Palmyra Museum	A 1295	BS III 82
Palmyra Museum	A 1301	BS III 83
Palmyra Museum	A 1269	BS III 84
Palmyra Museum	A 1287	BS III 85
Palmyra Museum	A 1305	BS III 86
Palmyra Museum	A 1307	BS III 87
Palmyra Museum	A 1291	BS III 88
Palmyra Museum	A 1312	BS III 89
Palmyra Museum	exc no. 36	BS III 9
Palmyra Museum	A 1275	BS III 90
Palmyra Museum	exc no. 271	BS VI p 113
Palmyra Museum	exc no. 123	BS VI p 114
Palmyra Museum	exc no. 238	BS VI p 114
Palmyra Museum	exc no. 244	BS VI p 114
Palmyra Museum	exc no. 128	BS VI p 115
Palmyra Museum	exc no. 13	BS VI p 116
Palmyra Museum	exc no. 133	BS VI p 116
Palmyra Museum	A 34	C3924
Palmyra Museum	A 34	C3925
Palmyra Museum	Room I, S wall	C3945
Palmyra Museum	S 1707	C3963
Palmyra Museum	41 and 45/62	C3967
Palmyra Museum	TE 320	C3988
Palmyra Museum	TE 1	C3989
Palmyra Museum	TE 220	C3998
Palmyra Museum	A 249	C4010
Palmyra Museum	A 255	C4035
Palmyra Museum	A 357	C4043
Palmyra Museum	A 417	C4075
Palmyra Museum	A 269	C4101
Palmyra Museum	A 453	C4105ter
Palmyra Museum	A 189	C4120
Palmyra Museum	A 177	C4125
Palmyra Museum	A 215	C4126
Palmyra Museum	A 215	C4127a
Palmyra Museum	A 215	C4127b
Palmyra Museum	A 152	C4163
Palmyra Museum	1403	C4166
Palmyra Museum	A 218	C4231
Palmyra Museum	218	C4232
Palmyra Museum	A 217	C4239
Palmyra Museum	1471/8834	CRAIBL ’85
Palmyra Museum	A 1415/8423	DaM ’85 p 37
Palmyra Museum	A 1416/8424	DaM ’85 p 37
Palmyra Museum	A 1415/8426	DaM ’85 p 38
Palmyra Museum	A 1417/8425	DaM ’85 p 38
Palmyra Museum	A 1419/8427	DaM ’85 p 39
Palmyra Museum	A 1420/8428	DaM ’85 p 39
Palmyra Museum	A 1422/8423	DaM ’85 p 39
Palmyra Museum	A 1465/8772	DaM ’85 p 40
Palmyra Museum	A 1472/8840	DaM ’85 p 40
Palmyra Museum	A 1473/8841	DaM ’85 p 40
Palmyra Museum	A 1474/8842	DaM ’85 p 40
Palmyra Museum	A 1475/8843	DaM ’85 p 41
Palmyra Museum	A 1475/8843	DaM ’85 p 41
Palmyra Museum	A 1441/8599	DaM ’85 p 42
Palmyra Museum	A 1454/8654	DaM ’85 p 42
Palmyra Museum	A 2471/8710	DaM ’85 p 42
Palmyra Museum	A 1453/8646	DaM ’85 p 43
Palmyra Museum	A 1460/8690	DaM ’85 p 43
Palmyra Museum	38 (?)	DaM ’85 p 44
Palmyra Museum	1937/7029	DaM 92
Palmyra Museum	1938/7030	DaM 92
Palmyra Museum	1939/7031	DaM 92
Palmyra Museum	1940/7032	DaM 92
Palmyra Museum	1941/7033	DaM 92
Palmyra Museum	1943/7035	DaM 92
Palmyra Museum	1944/7036	DaM 92
Palmyra Museum	1945/7037	DaM 92
Palmyra Museum	1946/7038	DaM 92
Palmyra Museum	1947/7039	DaM 92
Palmyra Museum	1948/7040	DaM 92
Palmyra Museum	1949/7041	DaM 92
Palmyra Museum	1950/7042	DaM 92
Palmyra Museum	1951/7043	DaM 92
Palmyra Museum	1952/7044	DaM 92
Palmyra Museum	1953/7045	DaM 92
Palmyra Museum	1954/7046	DaM 92
Palmyra Museum	1956/7048	DaM 92
Palmyra Museum	1957/7049	DaM 92
Palmyra Museum	1958/7050	DaM 92
Palmyra Museum	1959/7051	DaM 92
Palmyra Museum	1960/7052	DaM 92
Palmyra Museum	1961/7053	DaM 92
Palmyra Museum	1962/7054	DaM 92
Palmyra Museum	1963/7055	DaM 92
Palmyra Museum	1965/7057	DaM 92
Palmyra Museum	1966/7058	DaM 92
Palmyra Museum	1967/7059	DaM 92
Palmyra Museum	1968/7060	DaM 92
Palmyra Museum	1969/7061	DaM 92
Palmyra Museum	1970/7062	DaM 92
Palmyra Museum	1971/7063	DaM 92
Palmyra Museum	1972/7064	DaM 92
Palmyra Museum	1973/7065	DaM 92
Palmyra Museum	1974/7066	DaM 92
Palmyra Museum	1975/7067	DaM 92
Palmyra Museum	1976/7068	DaM 92
Palmyra Museum	1977/7069	DaM 92
Palmyra Museum	1978/7070	DaM 92
Palmyra Museum	1979/7071	DaM 92
Palmyra Museum	1980/7072	DaM 92
Palmyra Museum	1981/7073	DaM 92
Palmyra Museum	1982/7074	DaM 92
Palmyra Museum	1983/7075	DaM 92
Palmyra Museum	1984/7076	DaM 92
Palmyra Museum	1985/7077	DaM 92
Palmyra Museum	1986/7078	DaM 92
Palmyra Museum	A 11	Déd p 36
Palmyra Museum	B 7078	EblaDam p 290
Palmyra Museum	CD 147/75	HomVer
Palmyra Museum	CD 38/76	HomVer
Palmyra Museum	A 1040	Inv 10 102
Palmyra Museum	S 13 (A 633)	Inv 10 105
Palmyra Museum	S 1854	Inv 10 106
Palmyra Museum	A 621	Inv 10 107
Palmyra Museum	A 1057	Inv 10 11
Palmyra Museum	A 1054	Inv 10 110
Palmyra Museum	A 603	Inv 10 111
Palmyra Museum	A 1055 = A 1070	Inv 10 112
Palmyra Museum	S 1990	Inv 10 113
Palmyra Museum	A 618	Inv 10 114
Palmyra Museum	S 1872	Inv 10 115
Palmyra Museum	A 1066	Inv 10 118
Palmyra Museum	S 200	Inv 10 119
Palmyra Museum	A 972	Inv 10 12
Palmyra Museum	A 979	Inv 10 123
Palmyra Museum	nos. A 975 + A 976	Inv 10 124
Palmyra Museum	S 2338	Inv 10 126
Palmyra Museum	A 1901	Inv 10 127
Palmyra Museum	S 2342 = A 1105	Inv 10 128
Palmyra Museum	S 2343	Inv 10 129
Palmyra Museum	S 2351	Inv 10 130
Palmyra Museum	S 2352	Inv 10 131
Palmyra Museum	A 989	Inv 10 132
Palmyra Museum	A 1090	Inv 10 140
Palmyra Museum	S 2140	Inv 10 144
Palmyra Museum	S 2312	Inv 10 145
Palmyra Museum	A 993	Inv 10 16
Palmyra Museum	S 1737	Inv 10 29
Palmyra Museum	S 1494	Inv 10 38
Palmyra Museum	S 1307	Inv 10 39
Palmyra Museum	S 1911	Inv 10 4
Palmyra Museum	S 1308	Inv 10 40
Palmyra Museum	A 1023	Inv 10 42
Palmyra Museum	S 1861	Inv 10 44
Palmyra Museum	A 1033	Inv 10 48
Palmyra Museum	A 1039	Inv 10 49
Palmyra Museum	S 565	Inv 10 53
Palmyra Museum	S 1170	Inv 10 54
Palmyra Museum	A 1009	Inv 10 56
Palmyra Museum	S 1782	Inv 10 57
Palmyra Museum	S 1962	Inv 10 6
Palmyra Museum	A 1013	Inv 10 61
Palmyra Museum	A 1015 + A 1003	Inv 10 62
Palmyra Museum	S 1781	Inv 10 63
Palmyra Museum	A 999	Inv 10 65
Palmyra Museum	S 1209	Inv 10 69
Palmyra Museum	S 1910	Inv 10 7
Palmyra Museum	A 1008	Inv 10 70
Palmyra Museum	A 1017	Inv 10 72
Palmyra Museum	A 1004	Inv 10 74
Palmyra Museum	A 1005	Inv 10 75
Palmyra Museum	A 1001	Inv 10 76
Palmyra Museum	A 997	Inv 10 77
Palmyra Museum	S 760	Inv 10 78
Palmyra Museum	A 1057	Inv 10 8
Palmyra Museum	S 1903	Inv 10 81
Palmyra Museum	A 1056	Inv 10 85
Palmyra Museum	S 118 (A 969)	Inv 10 90
Palmyra Museum	A 1075	Inv 10 91
Palmyra Museum	A 1083	Inv 10 93
Palmyra Museum	A 1076	Inv 10 94
Palmyra Museum	A 964	Inv 10 96
Palmyra Museum	A 966	Inv 10 98
Palmyra Museum	A 968 + A 1037 + A 1030	Inv 10 99
Palmyra Museum	A 538	Inv 11 1
Palmyra Museum	A 286	Inv 11 10
Palmyra Museum	A 959	Inv 11 100
Palmyra Museum	A 1157	Inv 11 11
Palmyra Museum	A 390 + A 391	Inv 11 12
Palmyra Museum	A 1159	Inv 11 13
Palmyra Museum	A 255	Inv 11 14
Palmyra Museum	A 549	Inv 11 15
Palmyra Museum	A 377	Inv 11 16
Palmyra Museum	A 289	Inv 11 17
Palmyra Museum	A 438	Inv 11 19
Palmyra Museum	A 29	Inv 11 2
Palmyra Museum	A 273	Inv 11 20
Palmyra Museum	A 241	Inv 11 21
Palmyra Museum	A 242	Inv 11 22
Palmyra Museum	A 270	Inv 11 24
Palmyra Museum	A 274	Inv 11 25
Palmyra Museum	A 302	Inv 11 26
Palmyra Museum	A 374	Inv 11 27
Palmyra Museum	A 375	Inv 11 28
Palmyra Museum	A 837	Inv 11 3
Palmyra Museum	A 431	Inv 11 30
Palmyra Museum	A 433	Inv 11 31
Palmyra Museum	A 439	Inv 11 32
Palmyra Museum	A 466	Inv 11 33
Palmyra Museum	A 504	Inv 11 34
Palmyra Museum	A 508	Inv 11 35
Palmyra Museum	A 510	Inv 11 36
Palmyra Museum	A 528	Inv 11 37
Palmyra Museum	A 530	Inv 11 38
Palmyra Museum	A 558	Inv 11 39
Palmyra Museum	A 532	Inv 11 4
Palmyra Museum	A 709	Inv 11 40
Palmyra Museum	A 914	Inv 11 41
Palmyra Museum	A 924	Inv 11 42
Palmyra Museum	A 1155	Inv 11 44
Palmyra Museum	A 1158	Inv 11 45
Palmyra Museum	A 1160	Inv 11 46
Palmyra Museum	A 1161	Inv 11 47
Palmyra Museum	A 1162	Inv 11 48
Palmyra Museum	A 290	Inv 11 49
Palmyra Museum	A 525	Inv 11 5
Palmyra Museum	A 411	Inv 11 50
Palmyra Museum	A 244	Inv 11 51
Palmyra Museum	A 257	Inv 11 52
Palmyra Museum	A 298	Inv 11 53
Palmyra Museum	A 352	Inv 11 54
Palmyra Museum	A 363	Inv 11 55
Palmyra Museum	A 369	Inv 11 56
Palmyra Museum	A 379	Inv 11 57
Palmyra Museum	A 403	Inv 11 58
Palmyra Museum	A 408	Inv 11 59
Palmyra Museum	A 470	Inv 11 6
Palmyra Museum	A 416	Inv 11 60
Palmyra Museum	A 841	Inv 11 61
Palmyra Museum	A 857	Inv 11 62
Palmyra Museum	A 858	Inv 11 63
Palmyra Museum	A 896	Inv 11 64
Palmyra Museum	A 918	Inv 11 65
Palmyra Museum	A 840	Inv 11 66
Palmyra Museum	A 915	Inv 11 67
Palmyra Museum	A 309	Inv 11 68
Palmyra Museum	A 890	Inv 11 69
Palmyra Museum	A 573	Inv 11 7
Palmyra Museum	A 807	Inv 11 70
Palmyra Museum	A 712	Inv 11 71
Palmyra Museum	A 362	Inv 11 72
Palmyra Museum	A 912	Inv 11 73
Palmyra Museum	A 761	Inv 11 74
Palmyra Museum	A 865	Inv 11 75
Palmyra Museum	A 278	Inv 11 76
Palmyra Museum	A 931	Inv 11 77
Palmyra Museum	A 803	Inv 11 78
Palmyra Museum	A 435	Inv 11 79
Palmyra Museum	A 246	Inv 11 8
Palmyra Museum	A 445	Inv 11 80
Palmyra Museum	A 523	Inv 11 81
Palmyra Museum	A 280	Inv 11 82
Palmyra Museum	A 751	Inv 11 83
Palmyra Museum	A 895	Inv 11 85
Palmyra Museum	A 447	Inv 11 86
Palmyra Museum	A 839	Inv 11 87
Palmyra Museum	A 949	Inv 11 88
Palmyra Museum	A 948	Inv 11 89
Palmyra Museum	A 248	Inv 11 9
Palmyra Museum	A 945	Inv 11 90
Palmyra Museum	A 946	Inv 11 91
Palmyra Museum	A 953	Inv 11 92
Palmyra Museum	A 950	Inv 11 93
Palmyra Museum	A 954	Inv 11 94
Palmyra Museum	A 958	Inv 11 95
Palmyra Museum	A 962	Inv 11 96
Palmyra Museum	A 951	Inv 11 97
Palmyra Museum	A 952	Inv 11 98
Palmyra Museum	A 943	Inv 11 99
Palmyra Museum	1796/6645	Inv 12 10
Palmyra Museum	1796/6645	Inv 12 11
Palmyra Museum	1790/6639	Inv 12 12
Palmyra Museum	1788/6637	Inv 12 13
Palmyra Museum	A 1259	Inv 12 15
Palmyra Museum	1795/6644	Inv 12 2
Palmyra Museum	A 1392	Inv 12 22
Palmyra Museum	A 1393	Inv 12 24
Palmyra Museum	A 1382	Inv 12 25
Palmyra Museum	A 1246	Inv 12 26
Palmyra Museum	1795/6644	Inv 12 3
Palmyra Museum	A 1262	Inv 12 30
Palmyra Museum	1263	Inv 12 31
Palmyra Museum	1249	Inv 12 32
Palmyra Museum	1260	Inv 12 34
Palmyra Museum	1261	Inv 12 35
Palmyra Museum	1795/6644	Inv 12 4
Palmyra Museum	A 1401/8112	Inv 12 43
Palmyra Museum	1795/6644	Inv 12 5
Palmyra Museum	A 1400	Inv 12 53
Palmyra Museum	B 2195	Inv 12 54
Palmyra Museum	1234	Inv 12 55
Palmyra Museum	A 1233	Inv 12 56
Palmyra Museum	1795/6644	Inv 12 6
Palmyra Museum	1796/6645	Inv 12 7
Palmyra Museum	1796/6645	Inv 12 8
Palmyra Museum	1796/6645	Inv 12 9
Palmyra Museum	TE 243	Inv 6 4
Palmyra Museum	111	Inv 8 101
Palmyra Museum	112	Inv 8 102
Palmyra Museum	113	Inv 8 103
Palmyra Museum	A 114	Inv 8 104
Palmyra Museum	A 116	Inv 8 106
Palmyra Museum	A 117	Inv 8 107
Palmyra Museum	A 118	Inv 8 108
Palmyra Museum	A 119	Inv 8 109
Palmyra Museum	A 120	Inv 8 110
Palmyra Museum	A 121	Inv 8 111
Palmyra Museum	A 122	Inv 8 112
Palmyra Museum	A 124	Inv 8 113
Palmyra Museum	A 125	Inv 8 114
Palmyra Museum	A 126	Inv 8 115
Palmyra Museum	A 128	Inv 8 116
Palmyra Museum	A 129	Inv 8 117
Palmyra Museum	A 130	Inv 8 118
Palmyra Museum	A 131	Inv 8 119
Palmyra Museum	A 134	Inv 8 121
Palmyra Museum	A 135	Inv 8 122
Palmyra Museum	A 136	Inv 8 123
Palmyra Museum	A 137	Inv 8 124
Palmyra Museum	A 138	Inv 8 125
Palmyra Museum	A 139	Inv 8 126
Palmyra Museum	A 140	Inv 8 127
Palmyra Museum	A 141	Inv 8 128
Palmyra Museum	A 142	Inv 8 129
Palmyra Museum	A 143	Inv 8 130
Palmyra Museum	A 144	Inv 8 131
Palmyra Museum	A 145	Inv 8 132
Palmyra Museum	A 146	Inv 8 133
Palmyra Museum	A 147	Inv 8 134
Palmyra Museum	A 148	Inv 8 135
Palmyra Museum	A 149	Inv 8 136
Palmyra Museum	A 150	Inv 8 137
Palmyra Museum	A 151	Inv 8 138
Palmyra Museum	A 154	Inv 8 139
Palmyra Museum	A 155	Inv 8 140
Palmyra Museum	A 156	Inv 8 141
Palmyra Museum	A 157	Inv 8 142
Palmyra Museum	A 159	Inv 8 143
Palmyra Museum	A 160	Inv 8 144
Palmyra Museum	A 161	Inv 8 145
Palmyra Museum	A 162	Inv 8 146
Palmyra Museum	A 163	Inv 8 147
Palmyra Museum	A 165	Inv 8 148
Palmyra Museum	A 166	Inv 8 149
Palmyra Museum	A 167	Inv 8 150
Palmyra Museum	A 168	Inv 8 151
Palmyra Museum	A 169	Inv 8 152
Palmyra Museum	A 170	Inv 8 153
Palmyra Museum	A 171	Inv 8 154
Palmyra Museum	A 172	Inv 8 155
Palmyra Museum	A 173	Inv 8 156
Palmyra Museum	A 174	Inv 8 157
Palmyra Museum	A 175	Inv 8 158
Palmyra Museum	A 176	Inv 8 159
Palmyra Museum	A 179	Inv 8 162
Palmyra Museum	A 181	Inv 8 163
Palmyra Museum	A 184	Inv 8 165
Palmyra Museum	A 185	Inv 8 166
Palmyra Museum	A 186	Inv 8 167
Palmyra Museum	A 187	Inv 8 168
Palmyra Museum	A 188	Inv 8 169
Palmyra Museum	A 192	Inv 8 170
Palmyra Museum	A 193	Inv 8 171
Palmyra Museum	A 194	Inv 8 172
Palmyra Museum	A 195	Inv 8 173
Palmyra Museum	A 196	Inv 8 174
Palmyra Museum	A 197	Inv 8 175
Palmyra Museum	A 198	Inv 8 176
Palmyra Museum	A 199	Inv 8 177
Palmyra Museum	A 200	Inv 8 178
Palmyra Museum	A 201	Inv 8 179
Palmyra Museum	A 202	Inv 8 180
Palmyra Museum	A 203	Inv 8 181
Palmyra Museum	A 204	Inv 8 182
Palmyra Museum	A 205	Inv 8 183
Palmyra Museum	A 206	Inv 8 184
Palmyra Museum	A 207	Inv 8 185
Palmyra Museum	A 208	Inv 8 186
Palmyra Museum	A 209	Inv 8 187
Palmyra Museum	A 210	Inv 8 188
Palmyra Museum	A 211	Inv 8 189
Palmyra Museum	A 212	Inv 8 190
Palmyra Museum	A 213	Inv 8 191
Palmyra Museum	A 178	Inv 8 192
Palmyra Museum	A 219	Inv 8 195
Palmyra Museum	A 224	Inv 8 196
Palmyra Museum	A 225	Inv 8 197
Palmyra Museum	A 451	Inv 8 198
Palmyra Museum	A 342	Inv 8 199
Palmyra Museum	A 454	Inv 8 200
Palmyra Museum	A 72	Inv 8 32
Palmyra Museum	A 91	Inv 8 51
Palmyra Museum	A 105	Inv 8 59
Palmyra Museum	A 153	Inv 8 60
Palmyra Museum	A 99	Inv 8 62
Palmyra Museum	A 106	Inv 8 63
Palmyra Museum	A 521	Inv 8 64
Palmyra Museum	A 38	Inv 8 65
Palmyra Museum	A 100	Inv 8 66
Palmyra Museum	A 158	Inv 8 67
Palmyra Museum	A 98	Inv 8 69
Palmyra Museum	A 191	Inv 8 70
Palmyra Museum	A 180	Inv 8 72
Palmyra Museum	A 283	Inv 8 73
Palmyra Museum	A 182	Inv 8 74
Palmyra Museum	A 189	Inv 8 75
Palmyra Museum	A 190	Inv 8 76
Palmyra Museum	A 315	Inv 8 77
Palmyra Museum	A 316	Inv 8 78
Palmyra Museum	A 264	Inv 8 79
Palmyra Museum	A 320	Inv 8 81
Palmyra Museum	A 321	Inv 8 82
Palmyra Museum	A 322	Inv 8 83
Palmyra Museum	A 323	Inv 8 84
Palmyra Museum	A 325	Inv 8 85
Palmyra Museum	A 326	Inv 8 86
Palmyra Museum	A 328	Inv 8 88
Palmyra Museum	A 329	Inv 8 89
Palmyra Museum	A 330	Inv 8 90
Palmyra Museum	A 95	Inv 8 91
Palmyra Museum	A 96	Inv 8 92
Palmyra Museum	A 97	Inv 8 93
Palmyra Museum	A 101	Inv 8 94
Palmyra Museum	A 103	Inv 8 95
Palmyra Museum	A 104	Inv 8 96
Palmyra Museum	A 107	Inv 8 97
Palmyra Museum	A 108	Inv 8 98
Palmyra Museum	A 109	Inv 8 99
Palmyra Museum	A 26	Inv 9 1
Palmyra Museum	A 222	Inv 9 30
Palmyra Museum	A 233	Inv 9 35bis
Palmyra Museum	220	Inv 9 7
Palmyra Museum	A 618	MélDuss p 277
Palmyra Museum	A 1121	MUSJ ’61 p 125
Palmyra Museum	A 1192	MUSJ ’61 p 133
Palmyra Museum	CD 41/62	Palm IV p 190
Palmyra Museum	CD 25/62	Palm IV p 194
Palmyra Museum	TE 243	Palm V p 117
Palmyra Museum	CD 1/73	Palm VIII p 121
Palmyra Museum	CD 17/68	Palm VIII p 121
Palmyra Museum	CD 27/73	Palm VIII p 121
Palmyra Museum	CD 31/73	Palm VIII p 121
Palmyra Museum	CD 46/73	Palm VIII p 122
Palmyra Museum	CD 47/73	Palm VIII p 122
Palmyra Museum	CD 56/73	Palm VIII p 122
Palmyra Museum	CD 57/73	Palm VIII p 122
Palmyra Museum	CD 1/76	Palm VIII p 123
Palmyra Museum	A 1426	PGKK p 306
Palmyra Museum	A 1422	PGKK p 310
Palmyra Museum	B 2304 (A 1437/75)	PGKK p 310
Palmyra Museum	A 1399	RSP 105
Palmyra Museum	A 1171	RSP 106
Palmyra Museum	A 1179	RSP 107
Palmyra Museum	A 1172	RSP 108
Palmyra Museum	A 1209	RSP 109
Palmyra Museum	A 1207	RSP 110
Palmyra Museum	A 1184	RSP 111
Palmyra Museum	A 1205	RSP 112
Palmyra Museum	A 1208	RSP 113
Palmyra Museum	A 1204	RSP 114
Palmyra Museum	A 1175	RSP 115
Palmyra Museum	A 1174	RSP 116
Palmyra Museum	A 1176	RSP 117
Palmyra Museum	A 1206	RSP 118
Palmyra Museum	A 1177	RSP 119
Palmyra Museum	A 1178	RSP 120
Palmyra Museum	A 1173	RSP 121
Palmyra Museum	A 1100	RSP 122
Palmyra Museum	A 1185	RSP 123
Palmyra Museum	A 1180	RSP 124
Palmyra Museum	A 1168	RSP 125
Palmyra Museum	A 1167	RSP 126
Palmyra Museum	A 1169	RSP 127
Palmyra Museum	CD 156/60	RSP 134
Palmyra Museum	CD 75/61	RSP 135
Palmyra Museum	CD 96/61	RSP 136
Palmyra Museum	CD 106/62	RSP 137
Palmyra Museum	CD 103/62	RSP 138
Palmyra Museum	TE 140	RSP 139
Palmyra Museum	TE 149	RSP 140
Palmyra Museum	garden no. CD 32/63	RSP 142
Palmyra Museum	CD 70/65	RSP 143
Palmyra Museum	CD 18/66	RSP 144
Palmyra Museum	CD 140/60	RSP 145
Palmyra Museum	CD 74/61	RSP 146
Palmyra Museum	CD 36/59	RSP 147
Palmyra Museum	CD 27/59	RSP 148
Palmyra Museum	CD 102/60	RSP 149
Palmyra Museum	CD 129/60	RSP 150
Palmyra Museum	CD 101/60	RSP 151
Palmyra Museum	CD 72/65	RSP 153
Palmyra Museum	CD 71/65	RSP 154
Palmyra Museum	CD 40/66	RSP 155
Palmyra Museum	CD 69/63	RSP 159
Palmyra Museum	TE 55	RSP 160
Palmyra Museum	CD 38/66	RSP 161
Palmyra Museum	no. 187 garden	RSP 162
Palmyra Museum	CD 101/59	RSP 163
Palmyra Museum	CD 12/61	RSP 164
Palmyra Museum	CD 10/63	RSP 165
Palmyra Museum	A 1481	RSP 166
Palmyra Museum	CD 5/59	RSP 168
Palmyra Museum	CD 63/59	RSP 169
Palmyra Museum	CD 131/60	RSP 170
Palmyra Museum	CD 123/60	RSP 171
Palmyra Museum	CD 57/60	RSP 172
Palmyra Museum	CD 48/60	RSP 173
Palmyra Museum	CD 122/60	RSP 174
Palmyra Museum	CD 27/61	RSP 175
Palmyra Museum	CD 51/61	RSP 176
Palmyra Museum	CD 58/61	RSP 177
Palmyra Museum	CD 64/61	RSP 178
Palmyra Museum	CD 88/61	RSP 179
Palmyra Museum	CD 110/61	RSP 180
Palmyra Museum	CD 118/61	RSP 181
Palmyra Museum	CD 114/61	RSP 182
Palmyra Museum	CD 95/61	RSP 183
Palmyra Museum	CD 39/62	RSP 184
Palmyra Museum	CD 40/62	RSP 185
Palmyra Museum	CD 32/62	RSP 186
Palmyra Museum	CD 33/62	RSP 187
Palmyra Museum	CD 114/62	RSP 188
Palmyra Museum	B 2185	RSP 189
Palmyra Museum	25/63	RSP 190
Palmyra Museum	B 2211	RSP 191
Palmyra Museum	CD 42	RSP 192
Palmyra Museum	CD 67/63	RSP 193
Palmyra Museum	CD 3/65	RSP 194
Palmyra Museum	CD 35/66	RSP 195
Palmyra Museum	CD 47/66	RSP 196
Palmyra Museum	CD 42/67	RSP 197
Palmyra Museum	CD 2/69	RSP 198
Palmyra Museum	CD 18/59	RSP 199
Palmyra Museum	CD 48/59	RSP 200
Palmyra Museum	CD 47/59	RSP 201
Palmyra Museum	CD 60/59	RSP 202
Palmyra Museum	CD 7/59	RSP 203
Palmyra Museum	CD 84/60	RSP 204
Palmyra Museum	CD 130/60	RSP 205
Palmyra Museum	CD 46/60	RSP 206
Palmyra Museum	CD 93/60	RSP 207
Palmyra Museum	CD 16/60	RSP 208
Palmyra Museum	CD 14/60	RSP 209
Palmyra Museum	2047/7222	RSP 21
Palmyra Museum	CD 53/61	RSP 210
Palmyra Museum	CD 65/61	RSP 211
Palmyra Museum	CD 70/61	RSP 212
Palmyra Museum	CD 86/61	RSP 213
Palmyra Museum	CD 132-133/61	RSP 214
Palmyra Museum	CD 130/61	RSP 215
Palmyra Museum	CD 45/62	RSP 216
Palmyra Museum	CD 38/62	RSP 217
Palmyra Museum	CD 97/62	RSP 219
Palmyra Museum	2025/7223	RSP 22
Palmyra Museum	CD 29/63	RSP 220
Palmyra Museum	CD 14/65	RSP 221
Palmyra Museum	CD 239/65	RSP 222
Palmyra Museum	CD 240/65	RSP 223
Palmyra Museum	CD 241/65	RSP 224
Palmyra Museum	CD 242/65	RSP 225
Palmyra Museum	CD 29/66	RSP 226
Palmyra Museum	CD 13/66	RSP 227
Palmyra Museum	CD 36/66	RSP 228
Palmyra Museum	CD 43/66	RSP 229
Palmyra Museum	2027/7225	RSP 23
Palmyra Museum	1755/6579	RSP 27
Palmyra Museum	1764/6588	RSP 28
Palmyra Museum	1771/6595	RSP 29
Palmyra Museum	1759/6583	RSP 30
Palmyra Museum	1754/6578	RSP 31
Palmyra Museum	1784/6607	RSP 32
Palmyra Museum	1783/6606	RSP 33
Palmyra Museum	1750/6574	RSP 34
Palmyra Museum	1760/6584	RSP 35
Palmyra Museum	1752/6576	RSP 36
Palmyra Museum	1758/6582	RSP 37
Palmyra Museum	1778/6602	RSP 38
Palmyra Museum	1775/6599	RSP 39
Palmyra Museum	1777/6601	RSP 40
Palmyra Museum	1776/6590	RSP 41
Palmyra Museum	1772/6596	RSP 42
Palmyra Museum	1757/6581	RSP 43
Palmyra Museum	1756/6580	RSP 44
Palmyra Museum	T 9/19	RSP 47
Palmyra Museum	T 25/19	RSP 48
Palmyra Museum	T 10/62	RSP 49
Palmyra Museum	T 18/62	RSP 50 text A
Palmyra Museum	T 27/62	RSP 50 text B
Palmyra Museum	2137/7499	RSP 52
Palmyra Museum	2138/7600	RSP 53
Palmyra Museum	2139/7601	RSP 54
Palmyra Museum	2140/7602	RSP 55
Palmyra Museum	2141/7603	RSP 56
Palmyra Museum	2142/7604	RSP 57
Palmyra Museum	2143/7605	RSP 58
Palmyra Museum	2144/7606	RSP 59
Palmyra Museum	2145/7607	RSP 60
Palmyra Museum	2146/7608	RSP 61
Palmyra Museum	2147/7609	RSP 62
Palmyra Museum	2148/7610	RSP 63
Palmyra Museum	2149/7611	RSP 64
Palmyra Museum	2150/7612	RSP 65
Palmyra Museum	2151/7616	RSP 66
Palmyra Museum	2152/7614	RSP 67
Palmyra Museum	2153/7615	RSP 68
Palmyra Museum	2153/7616	RSP 69
Palmyra Museum	2155/7617	RSP 70
Palmyra Museum	2156/7621	RSP 71
Palmyra Museum	2157/7619	RSP 72
Palmyra Museum	2158/7620	RSP 73
Palmyra Museum	2159/7621	RSP 74
Palmyra Museum	A 1106	Sem ’50 p 47
Palmyra Museum	CD 6/74	Sem ’77 p 106
Palmyra Museum	1485/8973	Sem 93 p 164
Palmyra Museum	1238/6330	SFP 1
Palmyra Museum	1987/7112	SFP 122
Palmyra Museum	1987/7113	SFP 123
Palmyra Museum	1987/7114	SFP 124
Palmyra Museum	1987/7115	SFP 125
Palmyra Museum	1987/7116	SFP 126
Palmyra Museum	1987/7117	SFP 127
Palmyra Museum	1987/7118	SFP 128
Palmyra Museum	1987/7119	SFP 129
Palmyra Museum	1987/7120	SFP 130
Palmyra Museum	1987/7121	SFP 131
Palmyra Museum	1987/7122	SFP 132
Palmyra Museum	1987/7123	SFP 133
Palmyra Museum	1987/7124	SFP 134
Palmyra Museum	1987/7125	SFP 135
Palmyra Museum	1987/7126	SFP 136
Palmyra Museum	1987/7127	SFP 137
Palmyra Museum	1987/7128	SFP 138
Palmyra Museum	2004	SFP 139
Palmyra Museum	2005	SFP 140
Palmyra Museum	2006/7163	SFP 141
Palmyra Museum	2008	SFP 143
Palmyra Museum	2009	SFP 144
Palmyra Museum	2011	SFP 145
Palmyra Museum	2012	SFP 146
Palmyra Museum	2015	SFP 147
Palmyra Museum	2010	SFP 148
Palmyra Museum	2016	SFP 149
Palmyra Museum	A 1240/6405	SFP 15
Palmyra Museum	2017	SFP 150
Palmyra Museum	2013	SFP 151
Palmyra Museum	2018	SFP 152
Palmyra Museum	2014	SFP 154
Palmyra Museum	2023/7200	SFP 156
Palmyra Museum	2022/7199	SFP 157
Palmyra Museum	2020/7197	SFP 159
Palmyra Museum	A 1241/6406	SFP 16
Palmyra Museum	A 1242/6407	SFP 17
Palmyra Museum	A 1239/6332	SFP 3
Palmyra Museum	2007	SFP ad loc
Palmyra Museum	A 361	Syr ’36 p 268
Palmyra Museum	A 314	Syr ’36 p 271
Palmyra Museum	A 285	Syr ’36 p 274
Palmyra Museum	A 306	Syr ’36 p 280
Palmyra Museum	A 277	Syr ’36 p 348
Palmyra Museum	A 372	Syr ’36 p 349
Palmyra Museum	A 313	Syr ’36 p 350
Palmyra Museum	A 304	Syr ’36 p 351
Palmyra Museum	A 305	Syr ’36 p 353
Palmyra Museum	A 383	Syr ’38 p 153
Palmyra Museum	A 356	Syr ’38 p 154
Palmyra Museum	A 368	Syr ’38 p 155
Palmyra Museum	A 450	Syr ’38 p 157
Palmyra Museum	A 384	Syr ’38 p 158
Palmyra Museum	A 385	Syr ’38 p 158
Palmyra Museum	A 389	Syr ’38 p 159
Palmyra Museum	A 847	Syr ’38 p 159
Palmyra Museum	A 622	Syr ’38 p 78
Palmyra Museum	A 429	Syr ’38 p 79
Palmyra Museum	A 847	Syr ’38 p 80
Palmyra Museum	A 415	Syr ’38 p 81
Palmyra Museum	A 123	Syr ’38 p 82
Palmyra Museum	A 1126	Syr ’50 p 137
Palmyra Museum	1342/7483	Syr ’85 p
Palmyra Museum	1467/8774	Syr ’85 p 271
Palmyra Museum	1464/8771	Syr ’85 p 273
Palmyra Museum	1469/8824	Syr ’85 p 274
Palmyra Museum	1470/8828	Syr ’85 p 274
Palmyra Museum	1452/8642	Syr ’85 p 276
Palmyra Museum	1468/8831	Syr ’85 p 276
Palmyra Museum	no. A 1210/5332	Syr ’85 p 279
Palmyra Museum	exc no. 80 O	TG 36
Paris – Louvre	AO 4998	C4027
Paris – Louvre	AO 2205	C4112
Paris – Louvre	AO 2203	C4119
Paris – Louvre	AO 2204	C4218
Paris – Louvre	AO 2200	C4250
Paris – Louvre	AO 2201	C4251
Paris – Louvre	AO 1757	C4284
Paris – Louvre	AO 1558	C4287
Paris – Louvre	AO 1197	C4289
Paris – Louvre	AO 1557	C4321
Paris – Louvre	AO 2199	C4323 bis et ter
Paris – Louvre	AO 5005	C4331
Paris – Louvre	AO 22254	C4333
Paris – Louvre	AO 22253	C4334
Paris – Louvre	AO 1144	C4340
Paris – Louvre	AO 5006	C4375
Paris – Louvre	AO 5004	C4376
Paris – Louvre	AO 5000	C4377
Paris – Louvre	AO 2398	C4381
Paris – Louvre	AO 1555	C4398
Paris – Louvre	AO 1562	C4399
Paris – Louvre	AO 1556	C4401
Paris – Louvre	AO 4086	C4402
Paris – Louvre	AO 2630	C4410
Paris – Louvre	AO 1758	C4411
Paris – Louvre	AO 5007	C4412
Paris – Louvre	AO 2196	C4428
Paris – Louvre	AO 5972	C4457
Paris – Louvre	AO 4085	C4465
Paris – Louvre	AO 4449	C4470
Paris – Louvre	AO 2069	C4497
Paris – Louvre	AO 2067	C4498
Paris – Louvre	AO 2068	C4499
Paris – Louvre	AO 2198	C4500
Paris – Louvre	AO 2000	C4501
Paris – Louvre	AO 2093	C4502
Paris – Louvre	AO 1998	C4503
Paris – Louvre	AO 14926	C4530
Paris – Louvre	AO 4147	C4538
Paris – Louvre	AO 7476	C4572
Paris – Louvre	AO 3984	C4588
Paris – Louvre	AO 5991	C4607
Paris – Louvre	AO 4148	C4620
Paris – Louvre	AO 14925	C4621
Paris – Louvre	AO 26429	JA ’18 p 295
Paris – Louvre	AO 11450	Lou 149
Paris – Louvre	AO 28548	Lou 157
Paris – Louvre	AO 26430	Lou 232
Paris – Louvre	AO 29537	Lou 239
Paris – Louvre	AO 28360	MUSJ ’66 p 178
Paris – Louvre	AO 1194	PS no. 104
Paris – Louvre	AO 19801	Syr ’49 p 36
Paris – Louvre	AO 19801	Syr ’49 p 36
Paris – Louvre	AO 19801	Syr ’49 p 38
Paris – Louvre	AO 19801	Syr ’49 p 39
Paris – Louvre	AO 19801	Syr ’49 p 40
Paris – Louvre	AO 28377	Syr ’85 p 57
Paris – Louvre	AO 28381	Syr 30 pl. XLI
Philadelphia – University Museum	B 8906	PS no. 209
Philadelphia – University Museum	B 8902	PS no. 262
Philadelphia – University Museum	B 8905	PS no. 419
Pittsfield, Massachusetts – Berkshire Museum	1903.7.3	C4313
Pittsfield, Massachusetts – Berkshire Museum	1903.7.3	C4315
Pittsfield, Massachusetts – Berkshire Museum	1903.7.5	C4478
Pittsfield, Massachusetts – Berkshire Museum	1903.7.4	PS no. 356
Portland – Portland Art Museum	54.2	C4535
Portland – Portland Art Museum	54.3	C4537
Portland – Portland Art Museum	54.1	C4595
Princeton – Princeton University Art Museum	1946-109	C4312
Rome – Museo di Scultura Antica Giovanni Barracco	206	Déd p 43
Rome – Capitoline Museums	CE 6715 (= NCE 2406)	C3902
Rome – Capitoline Museums	CE 6721 (= NCE 2402)	C3903
Rome – Capitoline Museums	CE 6707 (= NCE 2398)	C3904
Rome – Museo delle Civiltà	6011	C4413
São Paulo – São Paulo University Museum	69/3.1	C4293
South Shields (England) – Arbeia Roman Fort Museum	TWCMS T 765	C3901
St. Louis – St. Louis Art Museum	24:60	C4561
St. Petersburg – Hermitage	4187	C3913
St. Petersburg – Hermitage	4177	C4129
St. Petersburg – Hermitage	8840	C4292
St. Petersburg – Hermitage	8844	C4574
St. Petersburg – Hermitage	8842	C4575
St. Petersburg – Hermitage	8843	C4577
St. Petersburg – Hermitage	8841	C4578
St. Petersburg – Hermitage	8839	C4579
Stanford – Stanford University Museum of Art	17204	JA ’18 p 282
Stanford – Stanford University Museum of Art	17200	Parl ’90 p 140
Stanford – Stanford University Museum of Art	17201	Parl ’90 p 141
Stanford – Stanford University Museum of Art	17205	Verm ’81 p 387
Strasbourg – Strasbourg Museum	S 236	C4545
Toronto – Royal Ontario Museum	953×94.2	PS no. 148
Toronto – Royal Ontario Museum	953×94.4	PS no. 203
Toronto – Royal Ontario Museum	953×94.1	PS no. 33
Toronto – Royal Ontario Museum	953×94.3	PS no. 394
Vienna – Kunsthistorisches Museum	I 1525	C4349
Vienna – Kunsthistorisches Museum	I 1526	C4351
Vienna – Kunsthistorisches Museum	I 1524	C4352
Vienna – Kunsthistorisches Museum	I 1523	C4353
Vienna – Kunsthistorisches Museum	1503	C4407
Warsaw – Muzeum Narodowe	199576	C4469
Washington – Freer Art Gallery	8.236	C4460
Wrocław – Muzeum Archidiecezjalnego	2250	PS no. 329

== Bibliography ==
=== Early publications ===
- Gruter, Jan (1603). Inscriptiones antiquae totius orbis Romani. Heidelberg.
- Gruter, Jan (1616). Inscriptionum Romanarum Corpus Absolutissimum [reprint]. Heidelberg.
- Spon, Jacob (1683). Recherches curieuses d'antiquité. Lyon.
- Spon, Jacob (1685). Miscellanea eruditae antiquitatis. Lyon.
- Halley, Edmond (1695). "Some Account of the Ancient State of the City of Palmyra, with Short Remarks upon the Inscriptions Found There". Philosophical Transactions of the Royal Society. 19 (218): 160–175. doi:10.1098/rstl.1695.0023.
- Halifax, William (1695). "A Relation of a Voyage from Aleppo to Palmyra in Syria". Philosophical Transactions of the Royal Society. 19: 83–110. doi:10.1098/rstl.1695.0016.
- Pulleyn, Octavian (1697). "Part of a Letter Giving an Account of an Inscription Found in the Language of the Palmyreni". Philosophical Transactions of the Royal Society. 19: 537–539. doi:10.1098/rstl.1695.0091.
- Bernard, Edward; Smith, Thomas (1698). Inscriptiones Graecae Palmyrenorumque cum Scholiis et Annotationibus. Utrecht.
- Hyde, Thomas (1700). Historia Religionis Veterum Persarum. Oxford.
- Renaudot, Eusèbe (1736). "Éclaircissement sur les explications que les Anglois ont données de quelques inscriptions de Palmyre". Mémoires de l'Académie Royale des Inscriptions et Belles-Lettres. 2: 474–494.
- Wood, Robert; Dawkins, James (1753). The Ruins of Palmyra, Otherwise Tedmor, in the Desart. London.
- Swinton, John (1755). "An Explication of all the Inscriptions in the Palmyrene Language and Character Hitherto Publish'd". Philosophical Transactions of the Royal Society. 48: 690–756.
- Barthélemy, Jean-Jacques (1759). "Réflexions sur l'alphabet et sur la langue dont on se servoit autrefois à Palmyre (1754)". Histoire de l'Académie royale des inscriptions et belles-lettres (in French). 26 (Académie des inscriptions et belles-lettres (France) Auteur du): 577–597, pl. I-III.
- Barthélemy, Jean-Jacques (1736). "Réflexions sur quelques monuments Phéniciens, et sur les alphabets qui en résultent". Mémoires de littérature, tirés des registres de l'académie royale des inscriptions et belles-lettres. 30 (read 12 April 1758): 405–427.
- Barthélemy, Jean-Jacques (1768). "Explication d'un bas-relief égyptien et de l'inscription phénicienne qui l'accompagne". Mémoires de l'Académie des Inscriptions et Belles-Lettres. 32: 725–738.
- Conder, C. R. (1890). "Relation of a Voyage to Tadmor in 1691". Palestine Exploration Fund Quarterly Statement: 273–303.
- Cumont, Franz (1928). "L'Autel palmyrénien du Musée du Capitole". Syria. 9 (2): 101–109. doi:10.3406/syria.1928.3280.

=== Early corpora ===
- de Vogüé, Eugène-Melchior (1868). Syrie centrale. Inscriptions sémitiques publiées avec traduction et commentaire par le Cte Melchior de Vogüé: Inscriptions arameennes (in French). J. Baudry.
- Cantineau, J. (1931). "Textes palmyreniens provenant de la fouille du Temple de Bêl". Syria. 12 (2). Institut Francais du Proche-Orient: 116–142. doi:10.3406/syria.1931.3528. ISSN 0039-7946. JSTOR 4195577.
- Cantineau, Jean (1933). "Tadmorea". Syria. 14 (2). Institut Francais du Proche-Orient: 169–202. doi:10.3406/syria.1933.3671. ISSN 0039-7946. JSTOR 4195739.
- Cantineau, Jean (1936). "Tadmorea (Suite)". Syria. 17 (3). Institut Francais du Proche-Orient: 267–282. doi:10.3406/syria.1936.8351. ISSN 0039-7946. JSTOR 4195958.
- Cantineau, Jean (1938). "Tadmorea (Suite)". Syria. 19 (1). Institut Francais du Proche-Orient: 72–82. doi:10.3406/syria.1938.4108. ISSN 0039-7946. JSTOR 4196116.

=== Later publications ===
- Astengo, Gregorio (2016-09-20). "The Rediscovery of Palmyra and Its Dissemination in Philosophical Transactions". Notes and Records: The Royal Society Journal of the History of Science. 70 (3): 209–230. doi:10.1098/rsnr.2015.0059. ISSN 0035-9149. PMC 4978726. PMID 31390424.
- Daniels, Peter T. (1988). "'Shewing of Hard Sentences and Dissolving of Doubts': The First Decipherment". Journal of the American Oriental Society. 108 (3). American Oriental Society: 419–436. doi:10.2307/603863. ISSN 0003-0279. JSTOR 603863.
- Hillers, Delbert R.; Cussini, Eleonora (1996). Palmyrene Aramaic Texts. Johns Hopkins University Press. ISBN 978-0-8018-5278-7.
- Hutton, Jeremy M. (2021-01-01). "Palmyrenica I: Notes and Addenda to the Published Resources". Maarav. 25 (1–2): 91–111. doi:10.1086/MAR202125107. ISSN 0149-5712.
- Lieu, Samuel N. C. (2017-09-07). "Imperialism and Language: Observations on Bilingual Inscriptions from Palmyra". Registers and Modes of Communication in the Ancient Near East. Abingdon, Oxon, UK; New York: Routledge. doi:10.4324/9781315206448-7. ISBN 978-1-315-20644-8.
- Pope, Maurice (1975). The Story of Archaeological Decipherment. New York: Scribner. ISBN 978-0-684-14304-0.
- Von Danckelman, Peter (2025-05-30). "Prosopographia Palmyrena". Digital Classics Online. Bd. 10: 55–76 Seiten. doi:10.11588/DCO.2024.10.103977.
- Yon, Jean-Baptiste (2013). "L' épigraphie Palmyrénienne depuis PAT, 1996-2011". Studia Palmyreńskie (in French). doi:10.11588/DIGLIT.26423.31.
- Yon, Jean-Baptiste (2024-01-23). "A Bilingual World?: Language and Epigraphy in Palmyra". The Oxford Handbook of Palmyra. Oxford University Press. doi:10.1093/oxfordhb/9780190858117.013.18. ISBN 978-0-19-085811-7.
