= Temple of Bel, Dura-Europos =

Temple in Dura-Europos

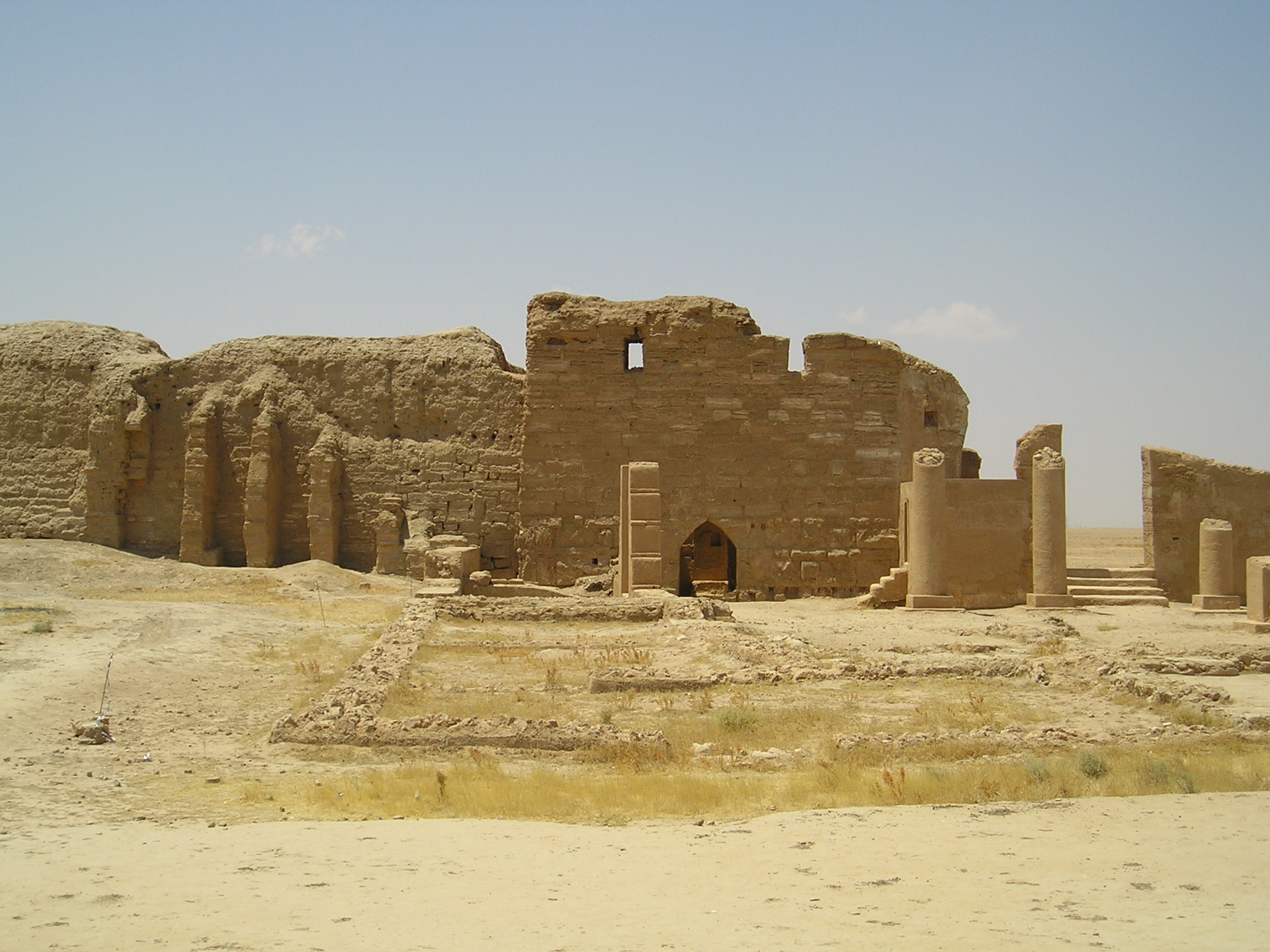
- Temple of Bel

- Location within Syria
- 34°45′03″N 40°43′33″E
- Type: Archaeological site / Sanctuary
- Periods: Classical antiquity, Hellenistic, Parthian, Roman
- Cultures: Greco-Syrian, Palmyrene, Roman
- Satellite of: Parthian Empire, Roman Empire
- Associated with: Local worshippers, Palmyrene traders, soldiers of the XXth Palmyrene Cohort
- Location: Dura-Europos (near Salhiyah)
- Region: Deir ez-Zor Governorate
- Part of: Block J9, Dura-Europos

History
- Built: 1st century B.C. (Parthian era foundation)
- Built by: Local elite / Palmyrene merchants
- Abandoned: 256 A.D. (destroyed during the Sasanian siege)

Site notes
- Material: Plaster and stone foundations, mudbrick superstructure
- Area: Spreads across two city blocks
- Excavation dates: 1922–1923 (Franz Cumont); 1929–1937 (Michael Rostovtzeff / Yale University)
- Archaeologists: Franz Cumont, Michael Rostovtzeff, Clark Hopkins
- Condition: Ruined (heavily looted/damaged by ISIS during the Syrian Civil War)
- Owner: State property
- Management: Directorate-General of Antiquities and Museums (DGAM)
- Public access: No (closed due to security and preservation status)

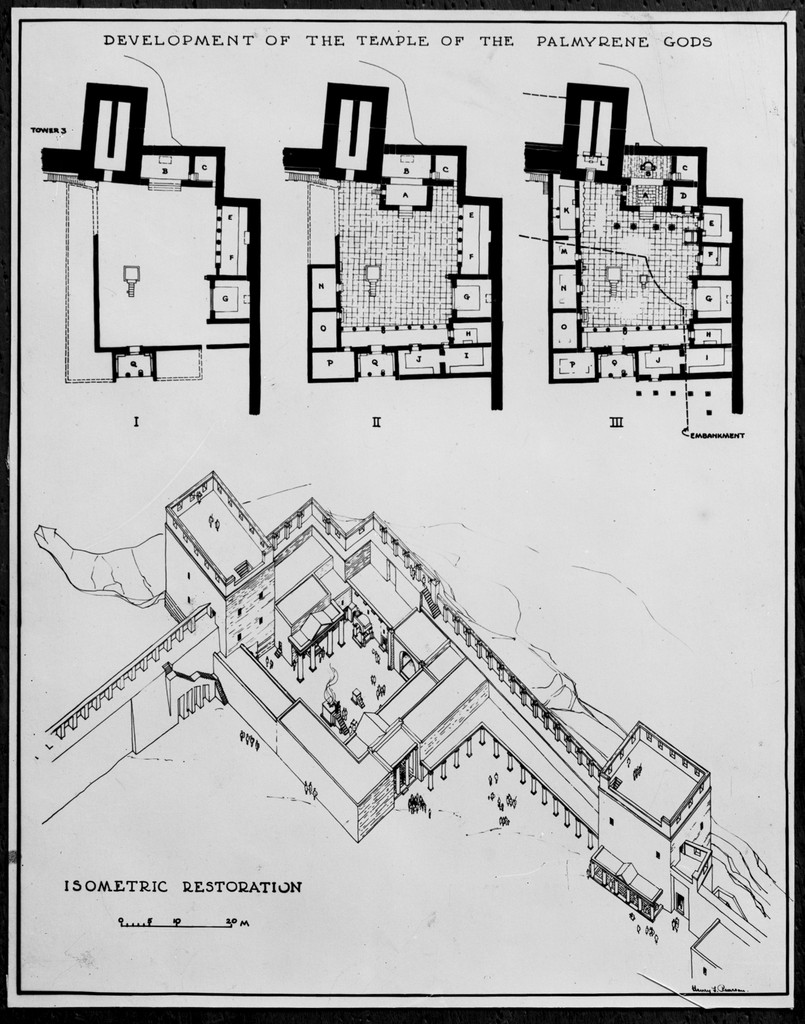
Pearson's drawing of the isometric reconstruction of Temple of Bel in the final period

The Temple of Bel, also known as the Temple of the Palmyrene gods, was located in Dura Europos, an ancient city on the Euphrates, in modern Syria. The temple was established in the first century BC and is celebrated primarily for its wall paintings. Despite the modern names of the structure, it is uncertain which gods were worshipped in the structure. Under Roman rule, the temple was dedicated to the Emperor Alexander Severus. In that period, the temple was located within the military camp of the XXth Palmyrene cohort.

== Discovery ==
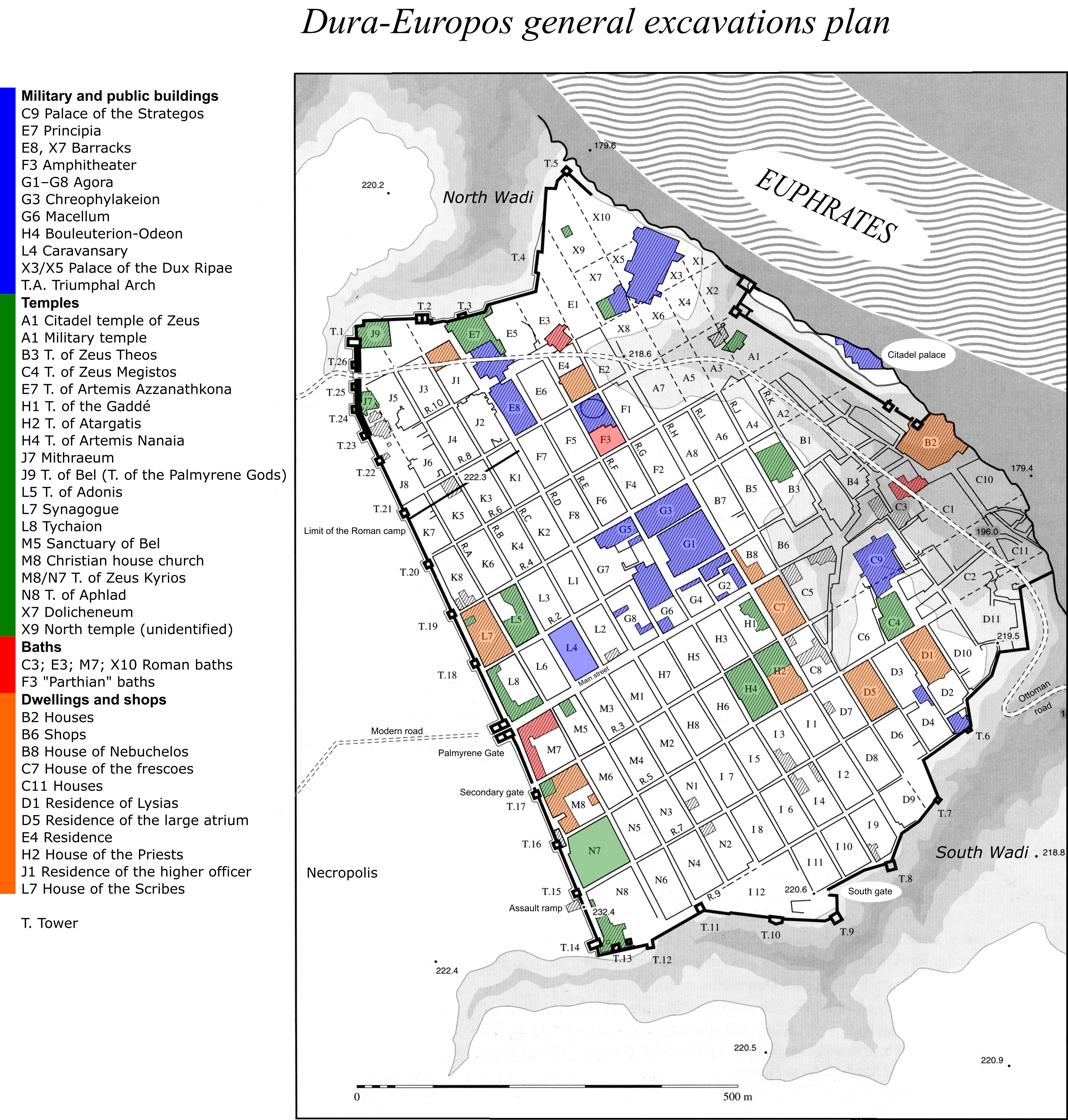
Dura-Europos general excavations plan, Temple of the Palmyrene gods is marked as J9

The temple's paintings were discovered in 1920 by M. C. Murphy. Photos of the paintings reached James Henry Breasted, who studied both the paintings and the temple and would publish a monograph about them in 1924. Before Murphy's discovery, the site was unknown to Westerners. Its identification with the town of Dura Europos, as known from ancient sources, only came later. The discovery of wall paintings in the temple sparked interest and the find was even reported in The New York Times, in an article from 10 June 1922. This article noted that the paintings represented a transitional stage between 'decadent Oriental Hellenistic art' and Byzantine art. The Temple of Bel was one of the first structures discovered at Dura in 1920. It was fully excavated but never published. In the Parthian times the Temple was likely dedicated to Zeus, as no evidence indicates Palmyrene worship during the Parthian period in which it was founded. Based on the unpublished iconography that Ted Kaizer analyzed, he argues that the deity who reigned under "Zeus" was Bel.

== Description ==
The temple is located in the northwest of the city, abutting the city wall. The northern and western walls of the temple are formed by the city wall. At least three construction phases can be discerned. The Holy of Holies was located in the west. The original construction phase consisted of a wide room, to which a vestibule was added in the second building phase. In front of the Holy of Holies was a courtyard, surrounded by various rooms, whose function is not yet clear. The main entrance to the temple was located on the east side of sanctuary, roughly opposite the holy of holies.

== Religious origins ==
The Temple of Bēl at Dura is known to be a center of religious life, where the god Iarhibol was worshiped. The origin of the god's name, Bel, comes from the influence of the cult of Bel-Marduk in Palmyra in 213 BC. Bel was known to be a chief god in pre-hellenistic times, often worshiped alongside Iarhibol and Aglibol.

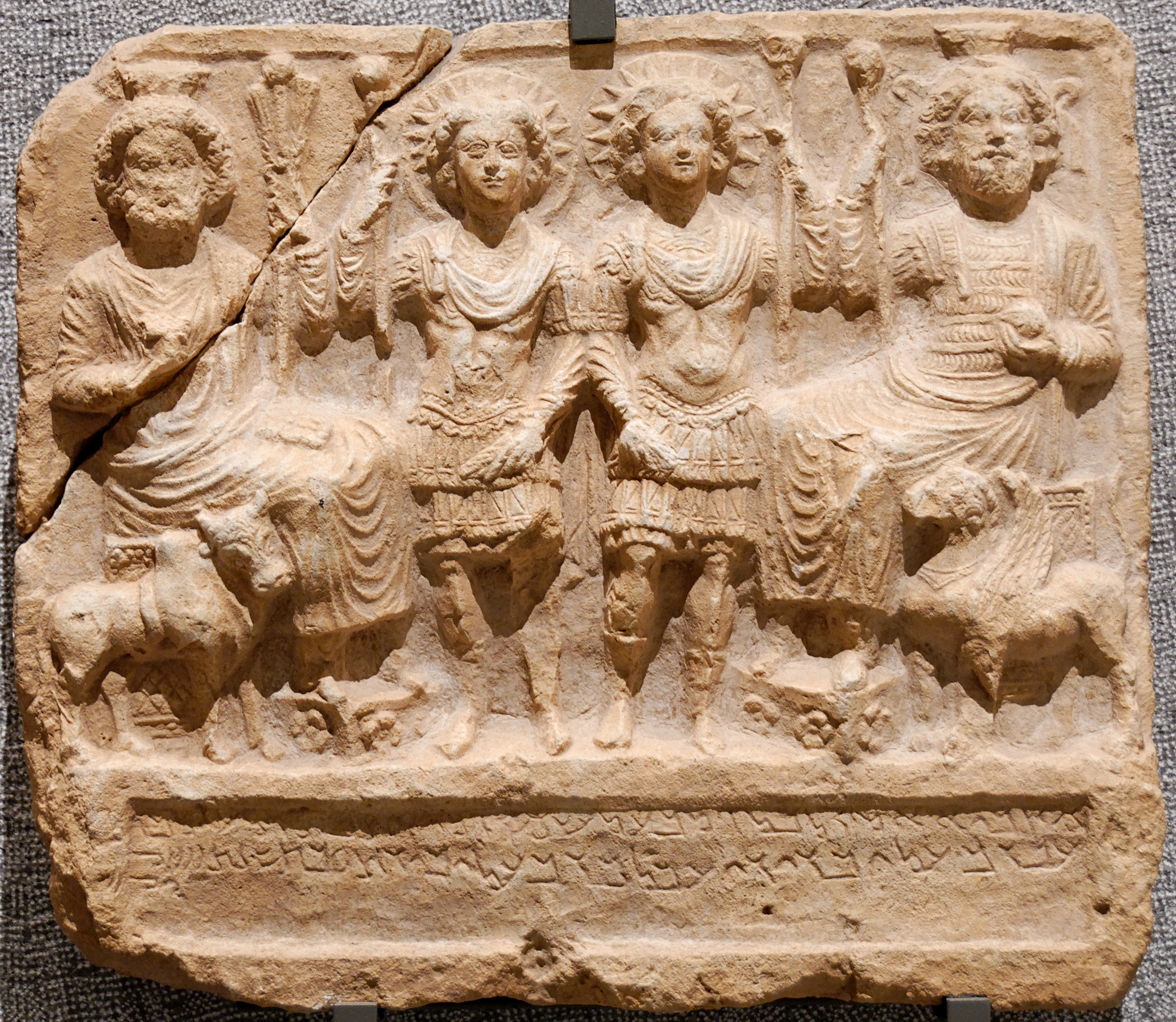
A base relief dedicated to Bel. Bel (to the far right), Baalshamin (to the far left), Iarhibol and Aglibol between them. Like Bel, Baalshamin was another supreme god of worship in ancient Syria.

== Iarhibol ==
Iarhibol is known as an Aramean god who was worshiped in ancient Palmyra. Iarhibol has appeared in several reliefs that depict him as the sun god, associated with the triad of Bel, standing alongside Aglibol to his right. Iarhibol never appears in busts or reliefs without these gods that create the symbolic Sun-Moon-Earth trinity. Thus, Iarhibol is known as the sun-god while Aglibol is known as the moon-god. Iarhibol is also associated with different temples in Dura. In the Temple of the Gadde, there is an inscription on a stele that gives Iarhibol the title "the good god, Bethyl of the Spring", which portrays him as the custodian of the Spring. However, literal translations of Iarhibol's name say that he was "the moon of Bel", which shows a connection with the Canaanite moon god Jarih.

== Altar's inscription ==
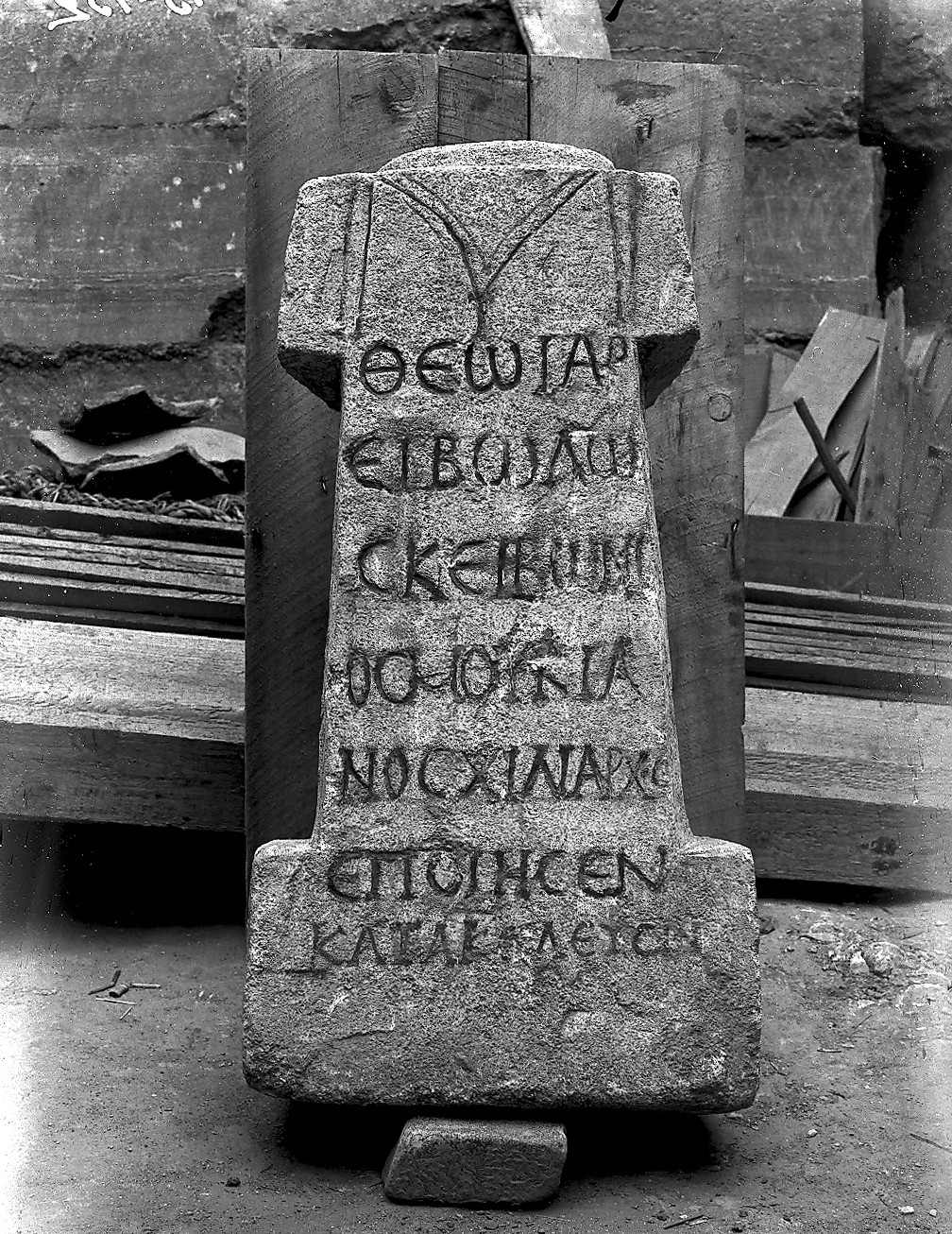
Photograph of the Altar to Iarhibol taken in 1928-1929

The Altar to Iarhibol was found at the entrance of the Temple of Bel by the Yale-French excavation team in the years of 1928-1929. The inscription on this Altar was inscribed in Greek by a Roman Commander, Skeibonios Moukianos, which reads: "To the god Iarhibol. Skeibonios Moukianos, the tribune, made this on command (of the god)." However, literal translations of the Greek suggest that Skeibonios is a misspelling for the Latin name Scribonius and that the transcription for Moukianos reads as Mucianus based on the evidence from the military parchments found from the excavation site. The inscription on the altar tells that a Latin-named Commander of a Roman army wrote his inscription to Iarhibol in Greek. Scribonius Moucianus, a Greek descendant who held a position of power in a Roman army. The inscription likely dates to around 165–256 CE. However, another translation offered for the text on the altar is as follows: "[For] the god Iarhibol, Scribonius Moucianus, chiliarch, made this as commanded." Thus, a Latin-named dedicant, who holds a Greek-titled office in the Roman army, records his offering to the Palmyrene god Yarhibol in Greek." The fact that the term Chiliarch refers to the commander in an Ancient Macedonian army raises more questions about who the inhabitants of the Temple might have been.

== Wall paintings ==
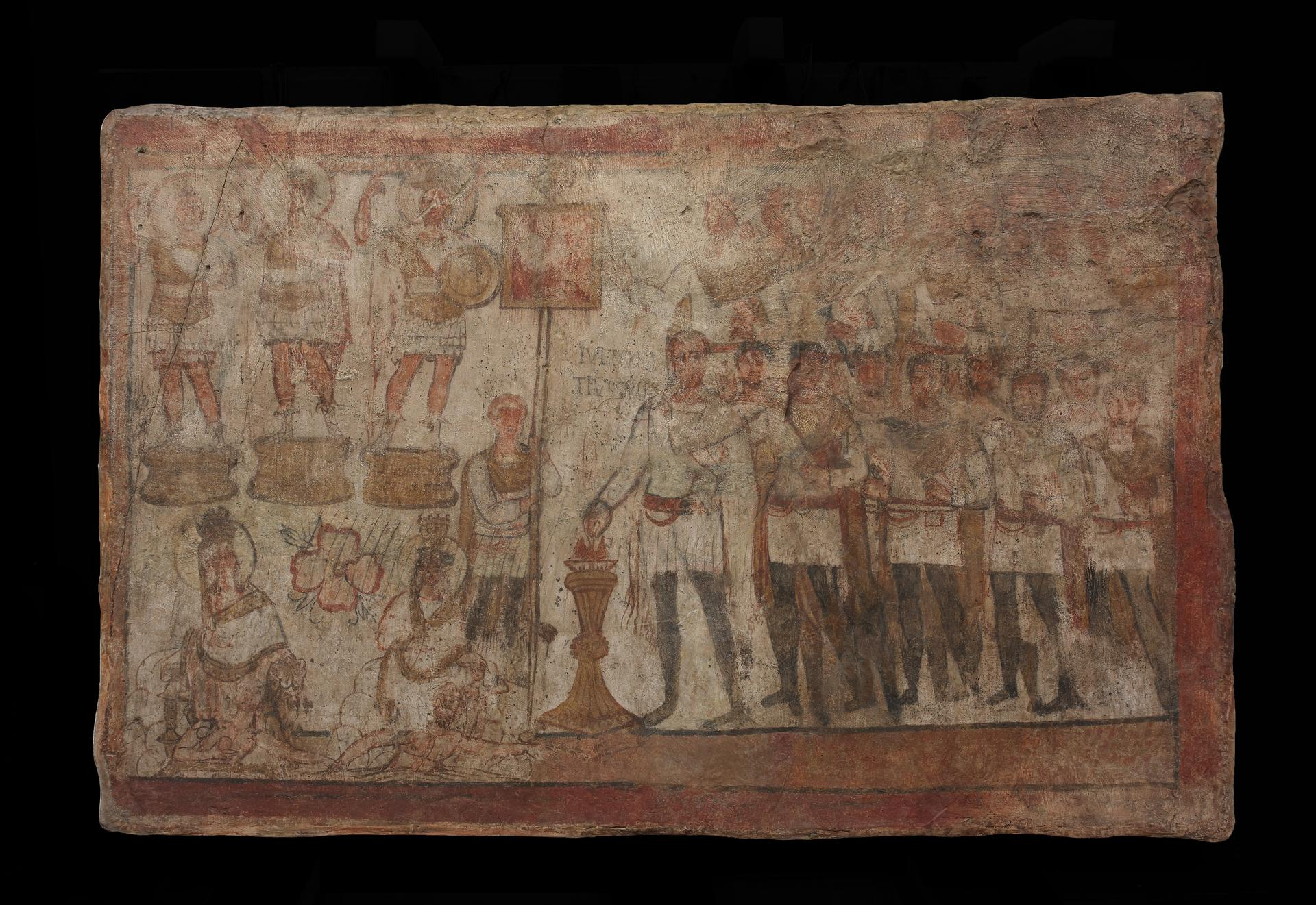
Julius Terentius Performing a Sacrifice. Commissioned by the Roman tribune at Dura-Europos, Julius Terentius (depicted and identified here by Latin inscription), this painting mixes Greek, Roman, and Palmyrene elements, perhaps as a gesture of diplomacy. Performing an official sacrifice in front of a military standard, Terentius stands with his men. Although in Roman military attire, these soldiers are Palmyrenes; one of them (Themes, son of Mokimos) is identified in Greek as a priest. The sacrifice, a burning of incense, was an act of worship common in both Near Eastern and Roman sanctuaries. Here it takes place in the presence of divinities, all nimbate. The Tychai of Dura and Palmyra are shown in Hellenistic style incorporating some Near Eastern features. Three male statues of deities enigmatically combine Roman cuirasses and Palmyrene attributes (such as the peaked helmet). Their lack of identifying labels creates ambiguity as to whether they represent Palmyrene gods or deified Roman emperors. This may have been done intentionally, to appeal to viewers of different backgrounds.

The temple is best known in art historical scholarship because of its wall paintings. At Dura-Europos, relatively well-preserved wall paintings survived, many of them dating from the period when the city was under Roman rule (AD 164-256). The paintings in the holy of holies, known as the Sacrifice of Konon, however, date to the late first century BC or early first century AD, when the city was under Parthian rule. At the time of their discovery, they were very well-preserved and the colours remained very vivid. The paintings were removed from the wall and are now found in the National Museum of Damascus. A typical feature of these images is the stark frontal focus of the figures. The colours were originally very bright. The faces were particularly well-executed by the artists and appear to be portraits of specific individuals. The figures are identified by small inscriptions next to them. From these it is learnt that the main figure is Konon and the other figures are several generations of his descendants.

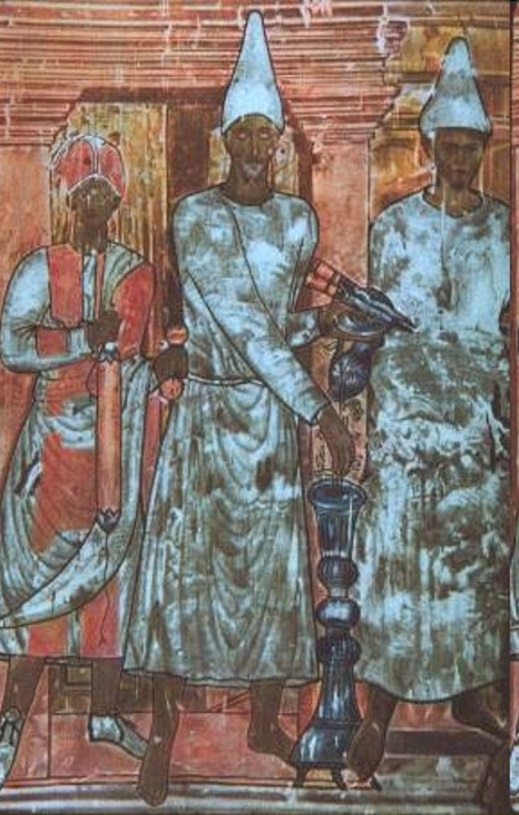
The sacrifice of Konon, wall painting in the Temple of Bel.

Another important wall painting is the Sacrifice of Julius Terentius, which was originally on the north wall of the pronaos, but today resides in the Yale University Art Gallery. This painting dates to the period of Roman rule and shows Julius Terentius, who was the Tribune of the Roman garrison in Dura-Europos. Julius Terentius is located in the centre of the scene. In front of him, there is an altar and statues of three deities. These deities were initially identified with the Palmyrene gods, Yarhibol, Aglibol, and Malakbel, hence one of the modern English names associated with the temple. More recent research has revealed the statues of the Roman emperor, indicating that this was a centre of Imperial cult. Below the statues, there are two female deities. These are depictions of Tyche (fortune). The inscription refers to them as the Tyche of Dura and the Tyche of Palmyra.
