= Bene Komare =

The Bene Komare were a Palmyrene tribe who were attested as one of the main four tribes of Palmyra.

== Name ==
The tribe was known as the Komare (Chomarenoi in Ancient Greek) and were only once mentioned with the Greek name Choneitai; both names mean priests. Komare is the plural of Kumra, which means priest in Aramaic, while Choneitai is the Greek plural of the Canaanite Kohen, which means priest.

== Origin and history ==
The Canaanite name occurred earlier than the Aramaic one, indicating that they were of Canaanite origin who became established in Palmyra before 32 BC. They were first mentioned in an inscription from Dura-Europos, when in 33 BC, Maliku son of Ramu from the Komare in association with a member of the Gaddibol tribe built a temple for Bel and Yarhibol in that city, which contained a Palmyrene trade colony. The Komare were one of the main four tribes in Palmyra which constituted the nucleus of the city's society. An inscription from November 21 AD mention that a certain Hashash son of Nesa from the Komare had a statue erected for him by his tribe and the tribe of Bene-Mattabol for his efforts in reconciling the two tribes who apparently got involved in a conflict.

The tribe was devoted to the cult of the gods Aglibol and Malakbel, and were connected with those deities temple known as the Holy Garden. The Komare were involved in the Palmyrene caravan trade and its merchants were attested in Babylon.
