= Necropolis Temple of Dura-Europos =

Coordinates: 34.746235°N 40.722908°E

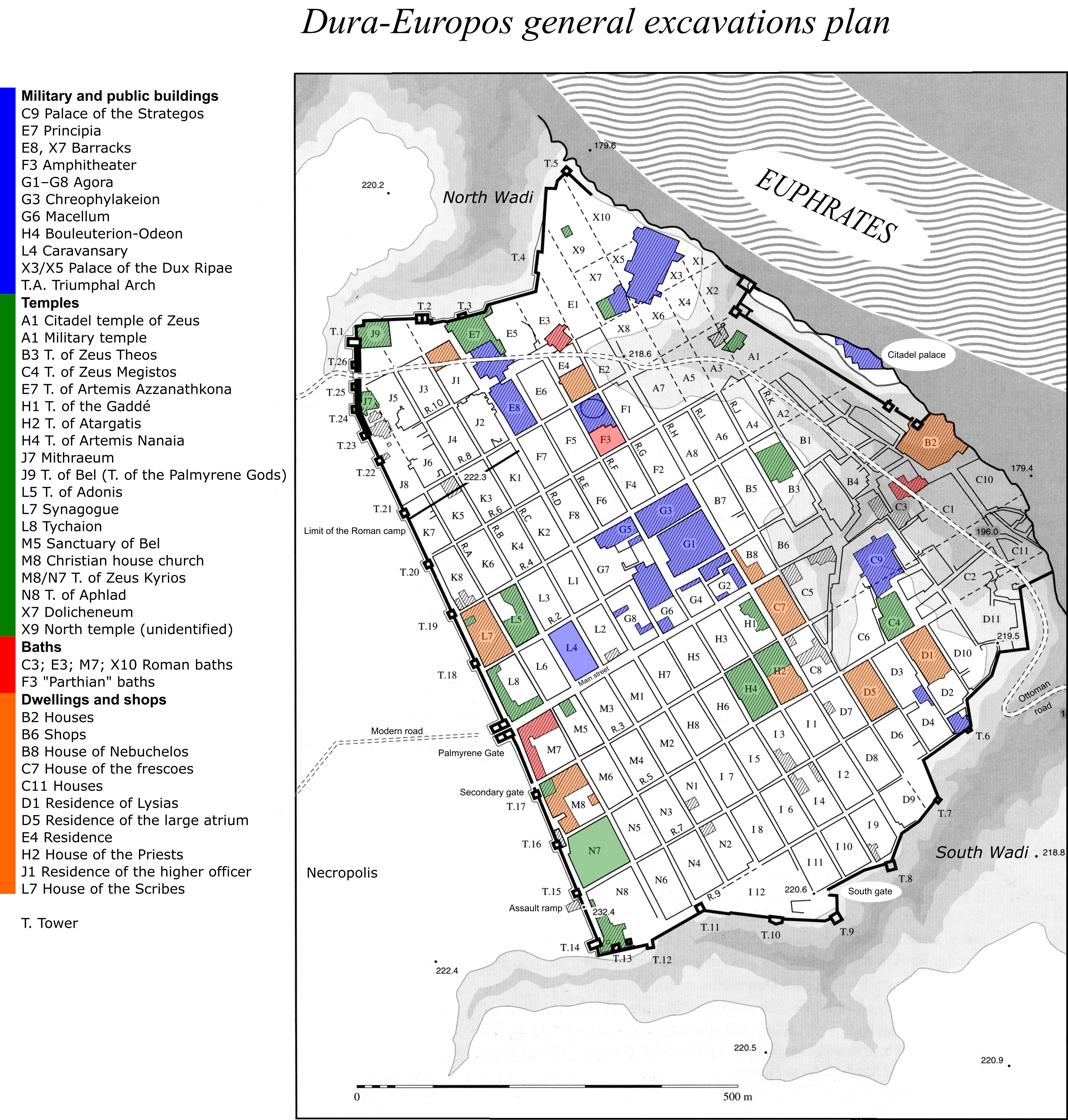
Dura-Europos general excavations plan, Necropolis is on the left side

The so-called necropolis temple was in the north of Dura-Europos, outside the city walls, about 150 m northwest of the main gate.

Although the temple was located in the city's necropolis, the cult there has no connection with the cemetery; the temple was built before a necropolis. It could be a first port of call for caravans coming from Palmyra. A cistern next to the temple may have served as a water point for the pack animals. According to the inscriptions of the temple was dedicated to Baal and Yarhibol. The temple was built in 33 BC. The temple initially consisted of a building with a large courtyard; the main entrance was in the east, the pronaos just opposite the entrance, in the west. The pronaos consisted of a large room with a niche (naos) on the back wall. In front of the Holy of Holies was a small portico with two pillars. In a second construction phase, a building of roughly the same size was added in the south. This building also had a courtyard in the middle and a sanctuary with a niche on the west side. The extension probably dates back to 173.

Remains of wall paintings were found in the temple. However, three inscriptions are particularly important. The oldest of them dates back to 33 BC (year 279 of the Seleucid era). The inscription is written in Palmyric. It is the oldest known inscription from Dura-Europos and when it was found and published in 1935 it was the oldest known Palmyric inscription at all. The founders are Zabdibol, son of Ba'yashu, and Maliku, son of Ramu. Zabdibol came from the Bene Gaddibol clan, Maliku from that of the Bene Komare. The donors were obviously Palmyrians who lived in Dura-Europos. It is noteworthy that the donors come from two different clans. In inscriptions from Palmyra, when different donors are named together in inscriptions, they always come from the same clan. The Bene Gaddibol clan is well documented in Palmyra. In Palmyra, belonging to a clan was an important part of one's identity. In Dura Europos clan membership obviously lost its meaning and two people from different clans could appear together. The common origin from Palmyra created a new identity.

A second inscription, written in Greek, is badly damaged, but seems to name Baal as the only god in the temple.

The third inscription, also in Greek, is not well preserved and comes from a Maribelos who may report that he built an annex in 173 AD. He seems to mention that the first building came from his ancestors. In this case it can be assumed that the administration of the sanctuary was inherited within the families.

== Sources ==
- J. A. Baird: Dura-Europos, London 2018, ISBN 9781472530875
- The Excavations at Dura-Europos. Preliminary Report of the Seventh and Eighth Seasons of Work, 1933–1934 and 1934–1935. Yale University Press, New Haven / Humpfrey Milford, London 1939, S. 319–320.
- Lucinda Dirven: The Palmyrenes of Dura-Europos. Brill, London, Boston, Köln 1999, ISBN 9789004295926, p. 41–66, 199–211 ("The temple of Bel in the necropolis of Dura-Europos").
