= Gad (deity) =

Pan-Semitic god of fortune

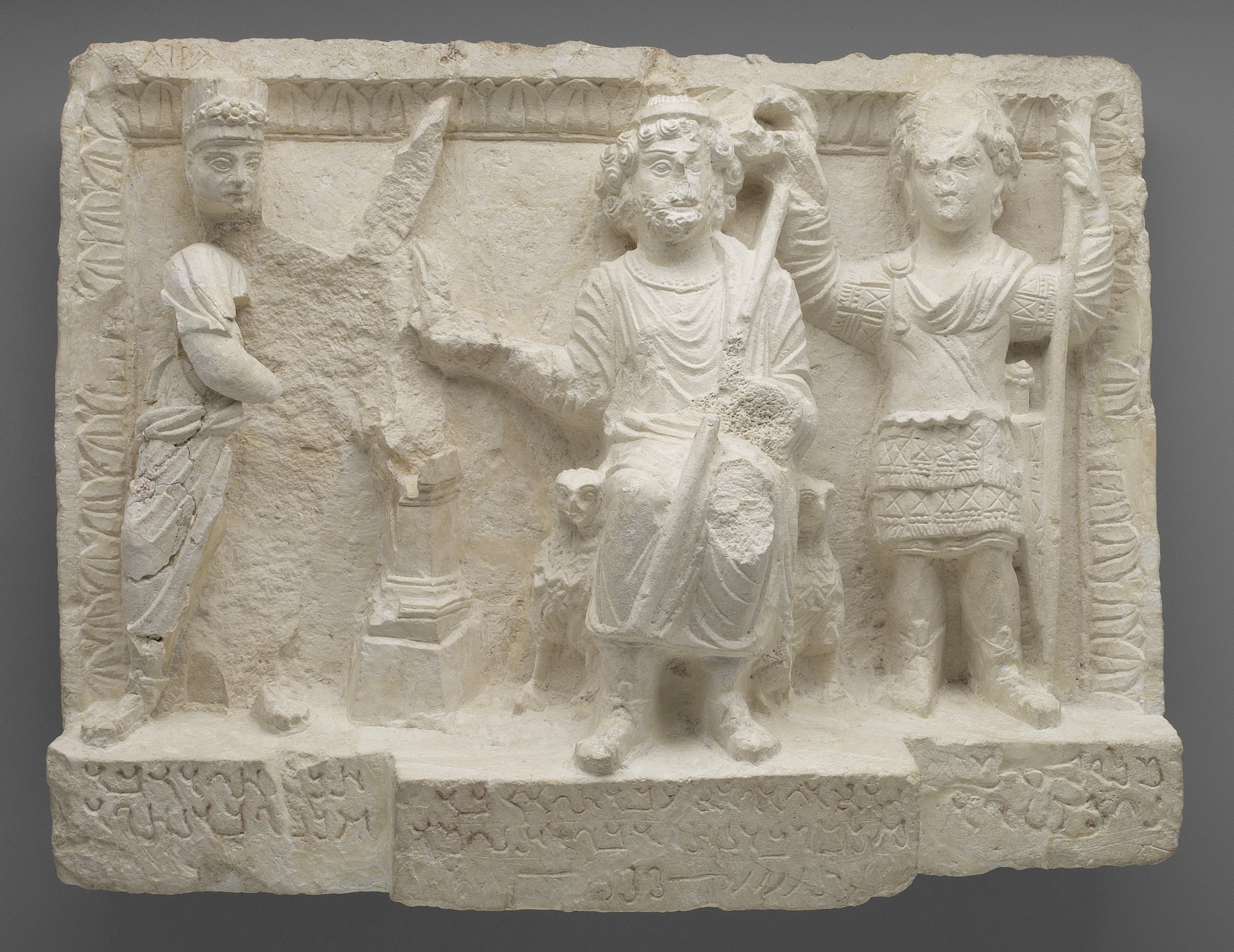
Relief from the Temple of the Gadde, Dura-Europos depicting the god "God" of Dura (center), king Seleucus I Nicator (right) and Hairan son of Maliko son of Nasor (left).

Gad was the name of the pan-Semitic god of fortune, usually depicted as a male but sometimes as a female, and is attested in ancient records of Aram and Arabia. Gad is also mentioned in the Bible as a deity in the Book of Isaiah (Isaiah 65:11 – some translations simply call him (the god of) Fortune), as having been worshipped by a number of Hebrews during the Babylonian captivity. Gad apparently differed from the god of destiny, who was known as Meni. The root verb in Gad means cut or divide, and from this comes the idea of fate being meted out.

== Israelite connection ==
It is possible that the son of Jacob named 'Gad' is named after the god, or that Gad is a theophoric name, or a descriptive.

== Cult ==
The extent to which the cult of Gad, the deity, was widespread in Canaanite times can be inferred from the names Baal-gad, a city located at the foot of Mount Hermon, and Migdal-gad, in the territory of Judah. Compare also the proper names Gaddi and Gaddiel in the tribes of Manasseh and Zebulun (Numbers 13:10, 11).

Gad is the patron of a locality, a mountain (Kodashim, tractate Hullin 40a), of an idol (Genesis Rabbah, lxiv), a house, or the world (Genesis Rabbah, lxxi.). Hence "luck" may also be bad (Ecclesiastes Rabbah, vii. 26). A couch or bed for this god of fortune is referred to in the Mishnaic tractate Nedarim 56a).

== Sources ==
- Kropp, A.J.M. (2013). Images and Monuments of Near Eastern Dynasts, 100 BC - AD 100. Oxford Studies in Ancient Cult. OUP Oxford. ISBN 978-0-19-967072-7.
- van der Toorn, Karel; Becking, Bob; Willem van der Horst, Pieter (1999). Dictionary of Deities and Demons in the Bible. Wm. B. Eerdmans Publishing. ISBN 9780802824912.
