= Temple of the Gadde =

Ancient temple in modern-day Syria

Coordinates: 34.747401°N 40.730809°E

The Temple of the Gadde is a temple in the modern-day Syrian city of Dura-Europos, located near the agora (insula H1). It contained reliefs dedicated to the tutelary deities (in Aramaic, Gaddē) of Dura-Europos and the nearby city of Palmyra, after whom the temple was named by its excavators. The temple was excavated between 1934 and January 1936 by the French/American expedition of Yale University, led by Michael Rostovtzeff.

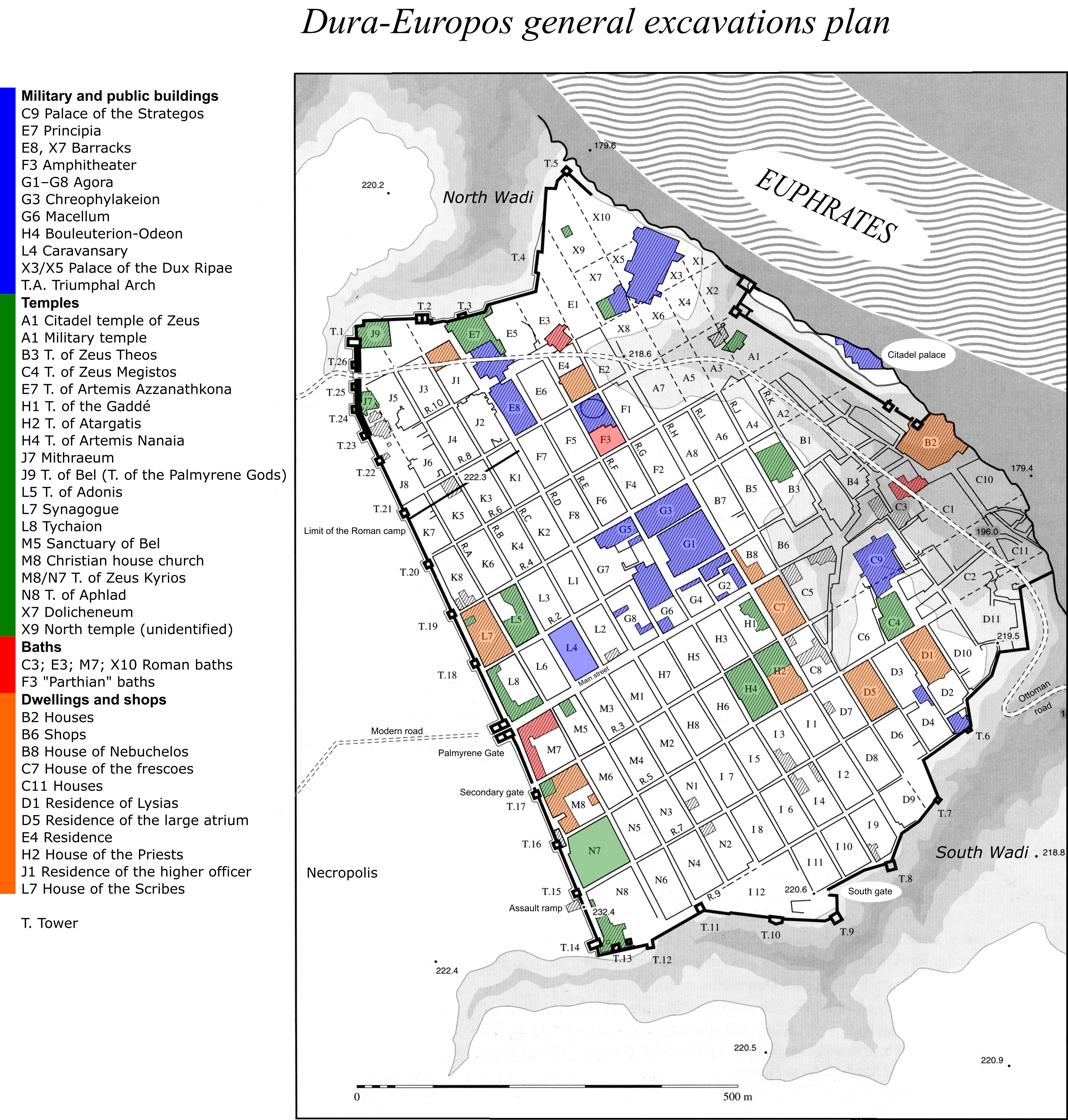
Dura-Europos general excavations plan, Temple of the Gadde is marked as H1

== Description ==
The city of Palmyra (also known as Tadmor, in Semitic languages) is located about 220 kilometers west of Dura-Europos. The oasis city flourished due to its participation in caravan trade. The presence of Palmyrenes in Dura-Europos is attested from 33 BCE onwards, where they lived as merchants or soldiers hired by the Roman army for their expert archery. Based on surviving text, the Temple of the Gadde was built by and for Palmyrenes living in or visiting Dura-Europos.

The age of the temple complex is unknown. According to the preliminary excavation report, the temple was repeatedly expanded and rebuilt over time. In total, four phases of construction can be discerned. The final phase (IV) is dated to 159 CE, since two relief sculptures have inscriptions dating them to this year. Phase III likely ended around 150 CE. The two earlier phases (II & I) must have fallen in the previous century, but the exact dates are not known. After 159 CE, the temple experienced no further noteworthy additions. Numerous small altars were set up in the temple as well as a platform at the main entrance.

The temple complex takes up much of the eastern section of insula H1. It measures about 42 meters north–south and 22 meters east–west. It has two parts, each accessed from the road to the east. The southern part of the temple contains the main courtyard and chief sanctuary. In the north, there is a second courtyard with various adjoining rooms. A propylon leads into the southern courtyard, on the opposite side of which there is a pronaos and cella (Naos 3) with further rooms. The pronaos is 11.05 m wide and 5.1 m deep. The interior room was originally about 8 m high and decorated with wall paintings, which only survive in tiny fragments. The cella is 4.48 m wide and 4.12 m deep. The cella contained three niches on the western side (opposite the entrance). One part of the room was decorated solely with figural wall paintings, but little of the painting survives. To the north of the pronaos was a hall with several rows of benches (known as a salle à gradins). Through this hall was the north courtyard, which contained another cella. A foundation deposit was found beneath the sanctuary, consisting of 21 amulets.

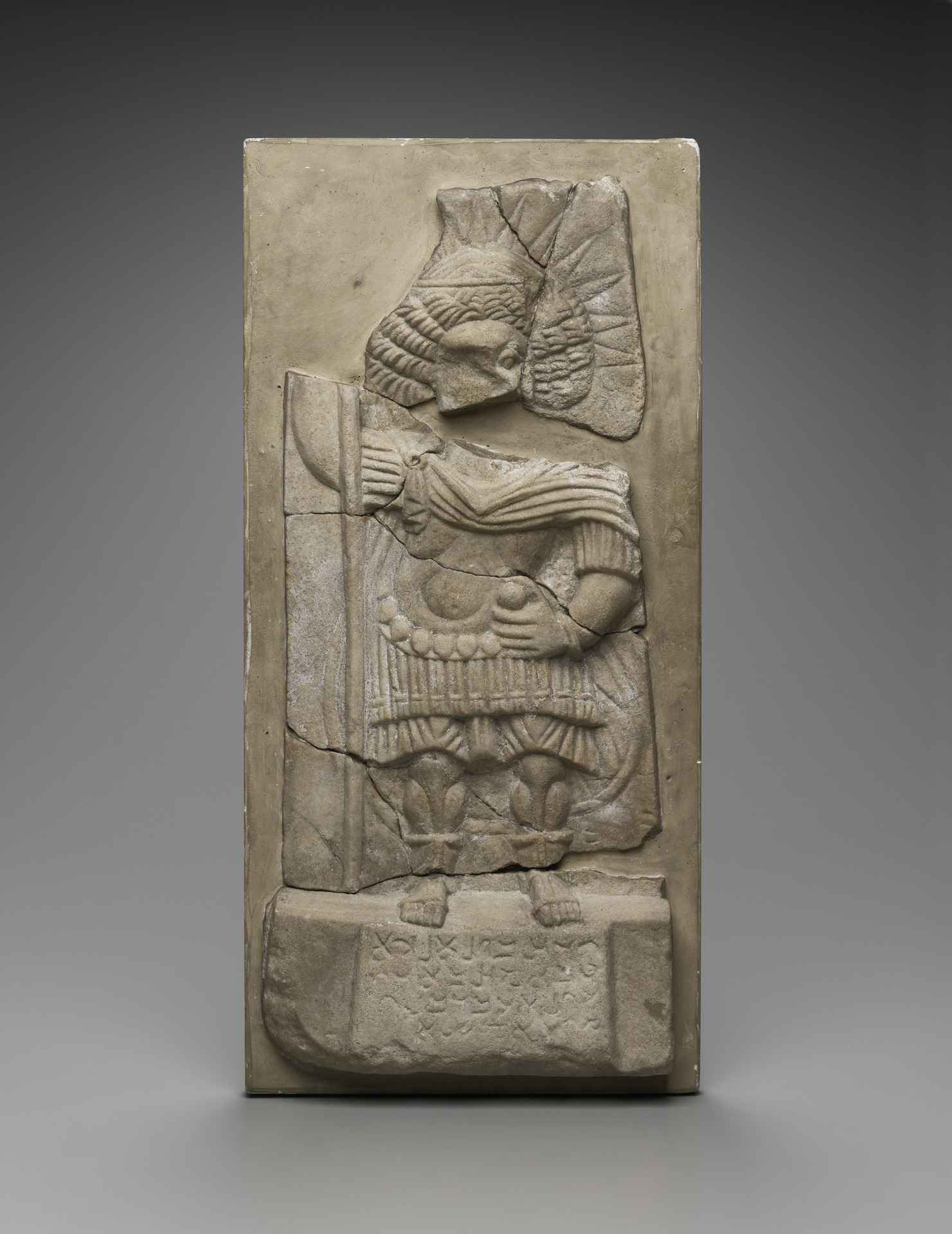
Relief with figure of Iarhibol

The temple contained a large number of graffiti, in Palmyrene, Greek, and Latin.

== Relief sculpture ==
The modern name of the temple derives from two dedicatory reliefs, which were found in fragments, in the main cella (Naos 3). These reliefs were originally located on the side walls of the cella. Fragments of a third, larger relief were also excavated. This relief would have hung on the cella's central wall and depicted the primary god of the sanctuary (probably the sun god Malakbel, judging by a fragment that portrays a griffin-drawn chariot).

The cella contained a fourth small relief which depicts the Semitic god Iarhibol. An inscription records "Bnai Mitha, the archers" as its donors. A small statue representing Nabû was also found. Its inscription reads, "Nabû. Zabda, the son of Zab[dil]la has made (it)."

=== Relief of the Gad of Palmyra ===
The relief, measuring 0.57 m x 0.47 m, depicts the female protective deity of Palmyra wearing a Greek himation. She sits on a rock at the center of the relief, surrounded by other figures. She wears a mural crown, signifying that she is a city goddess.

There are two inscriptions at the base of the relief. The dedicatory inscription, translated from the Palmyrene language, reads: "The Gad of Palmyra, made by Hairan bar [son of] Maliku bar [son or descendant of] Nasor." A second inscription gives a date, "in the month of Nisan, year 470 [= March/April 159 CE]." A black dipinto on the top border of the relief reads "May [Hai]ran, (the son) of Maliku, (the son) of [Nasor], be remembered."

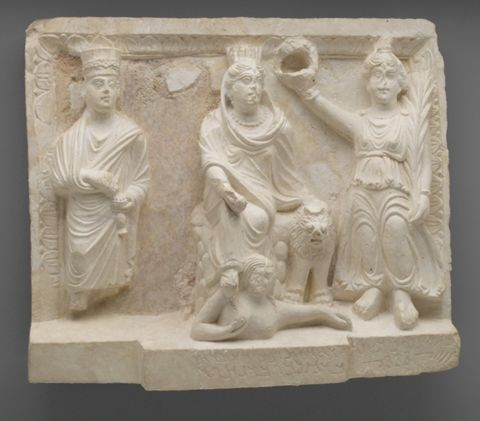
Palmyrene relief representing the god ("Gad") of Palmyra, Dura-Europos, Temple of the Gadde, naos, 159 CE

Hairan, the dedicator of the relief and probably its commissioner, is believed to have been a Palmyrene aristocrat, based on the rarity of his name and the inscriptions marking his lineage. He stands to the right of the Gad (the dipinto inscription which names him is on the border above this figure's head). Hairan is depicted as a Palmyrene priest (signified by his hat, often called a modius, which was common in portraits of other Palmyrene priests). He carries an offering to the Gad, likely of oil and incense signified by a flask and a bowl. His feet and ankles are missing due to damage prior to excavation.

The Palmyrene term Gad refers to a figure who embodies luck or good fortune as well as the identity of a city. This explains why the deity in this image is also referred to as Fortuna, the Roman equivalent of this goddess, or Tyche, the Greek. It is probable that the female Gad of Palmyra, along with much of her iconography, developed from the Greco-Roman tradition of depicting a city as a goddess. Representations of similar Tyche figures on coins have been found elsewhere in the Parthian empire.

On the Gad's left is a wingless Nike, who crowns the Gad with a laurel wreath using one hand and holds a palm branch with the other. Also on the Gad's left, seated by her side, is a lion with a crescent on its head. There may have been another lion at her right side, lost due to damage, judging by the double griffins of the relief to the Gad of Dura. The lion as well as the upwards-facing crescent appear elsewhere in Palmyrene art, and are associated with other Palmyrene deities. A similar crescent appears in a relief to the god Arsu found at Dura-Europos, and there are multiple representations on Palmyrene coins of the goddess Atargatis riding a lion or seated in between two lions.

The female Gad rests one foot on another woman's shoulder. This nude woman holds her right breast and appears to be rising out of the ground, as if from water, indicating that she represents Palmyra's water source: the Efqa spring. This figure is comparable to the river god who supports the feet of the Tyche of Antioch. In both cases, the Tyche is depicted as physically supported by the water source of the city. This feature, as well as the Gad's clothes, crown, and the rock as her seat, suggest that this relief was modeled in part after Eutychides' sculpture of the Tyche of Antioch. The lion figure and mural crown are also depicted in a statue of Atargatis from Hierapolis-Mabbug, indicating syncretism between Tyche, the Gad Palmyra, and the goddess Atargatis.

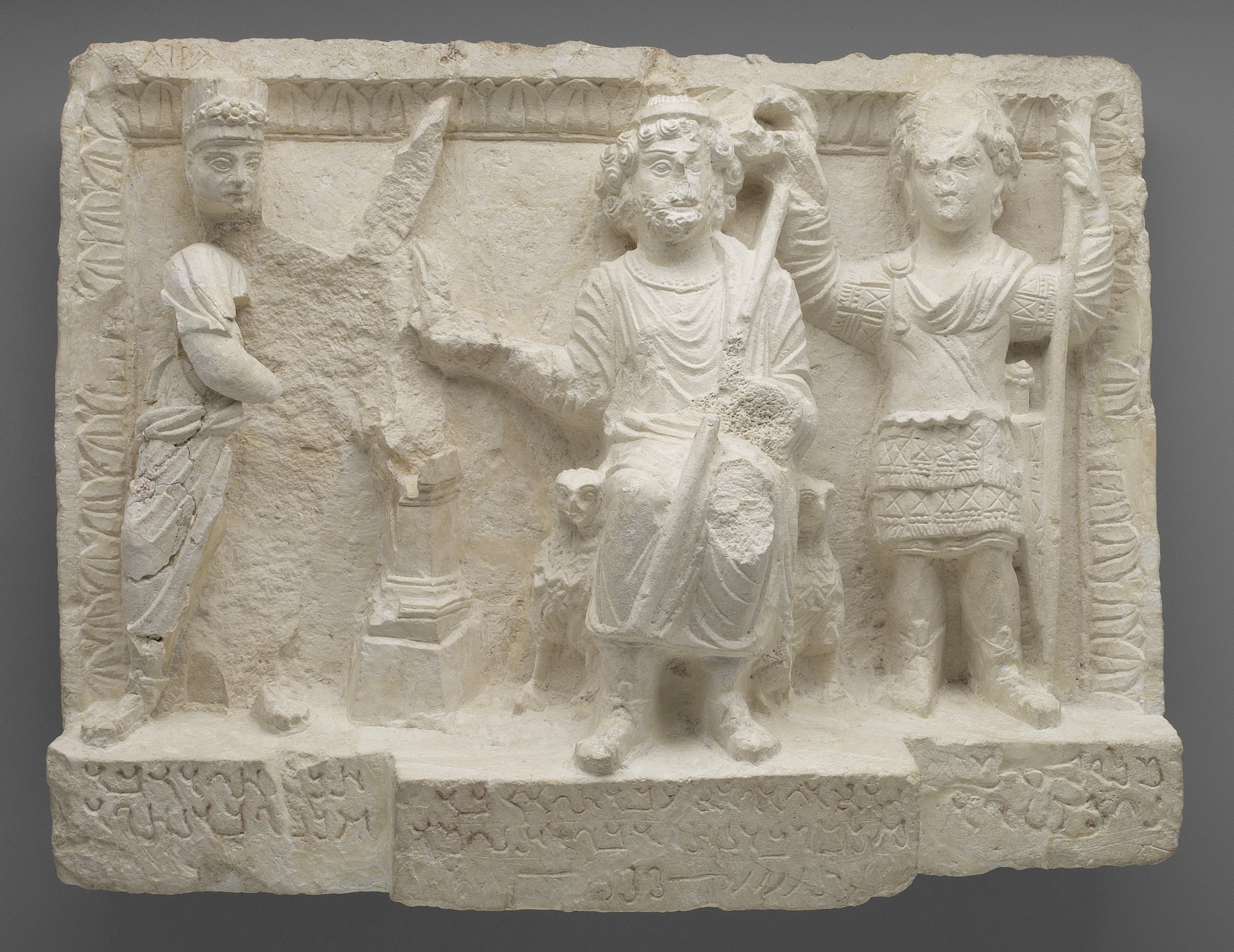
Relief from the Temple of the Gadde at Dura-Europos depicting the Gad of Dura (center), King Seleucus I Nicator (right) and Hairan son of Maliko son of Nasor, a possible relative of Odaenathus (left)

=== Relief of the Gad of Dura ===
The accompanying relief found in the Temple of the Gadde measures 0.62 x 0.47 m and depicts the male protective deity of Dura-Europos. He is bearded and wears a tunic. He very closely resembles Zeus Megistos. At his right is Seleucus Nicator, as the Palmyrene inscription indicates, and on the left is the dedicator of the relief. Dura-Europos was founded during the reign of Seleucus (311–280 BC); even several centuries later he was the object of special veneration in the city.

At the Gad's left is a Palmyrene priest (identified by his modius). Much of his body has been lost due to damage prior to excavation.

The relief is probably the product of a Palmyrene workshop. It was dedicated by the same donor in the same year as the first relief. The dedicatory inscription on the bottom border of the relief states: "The god, Gad of Dura; made by Hairan bar Maliku bar Nasor, in the month of Nisan, year 470 [159 CE]."

According to a carbon study at Yale University, the reliefs to the Gadde of Palmyra and Dura were both carved from limestone that was sourced from a quarry near Palmyra. The years inscribed suggest that both reliefs are from 159 CE, which was during the Parthian era or arguably an early period of Roman occupation at Dura. Both reliefs have decorative borders with a similar repeating leaf motif, common for Palmyrene craftwork. Both scenes are carved in the high relief, frontal style associated with Parthian art, with slight differences between the two in technique for hair and fabric. The pair's similarity of style and matching borders, inscriptions, donor, and date suggest that they were made by different sculptors at the same Palmyrene workshop. Both figures, the Gadde of Dura and of Palmyra, are also depicted at the bottom left of a wall painting found in the Temple of the Palmyrene Gods. In this painting, the Gad Palmyra is again shown wearing a mural crown, seated on a rock, and supported by a figure rising out of a body of water.
