= Baalshamin =

Northwest Semitic sky god

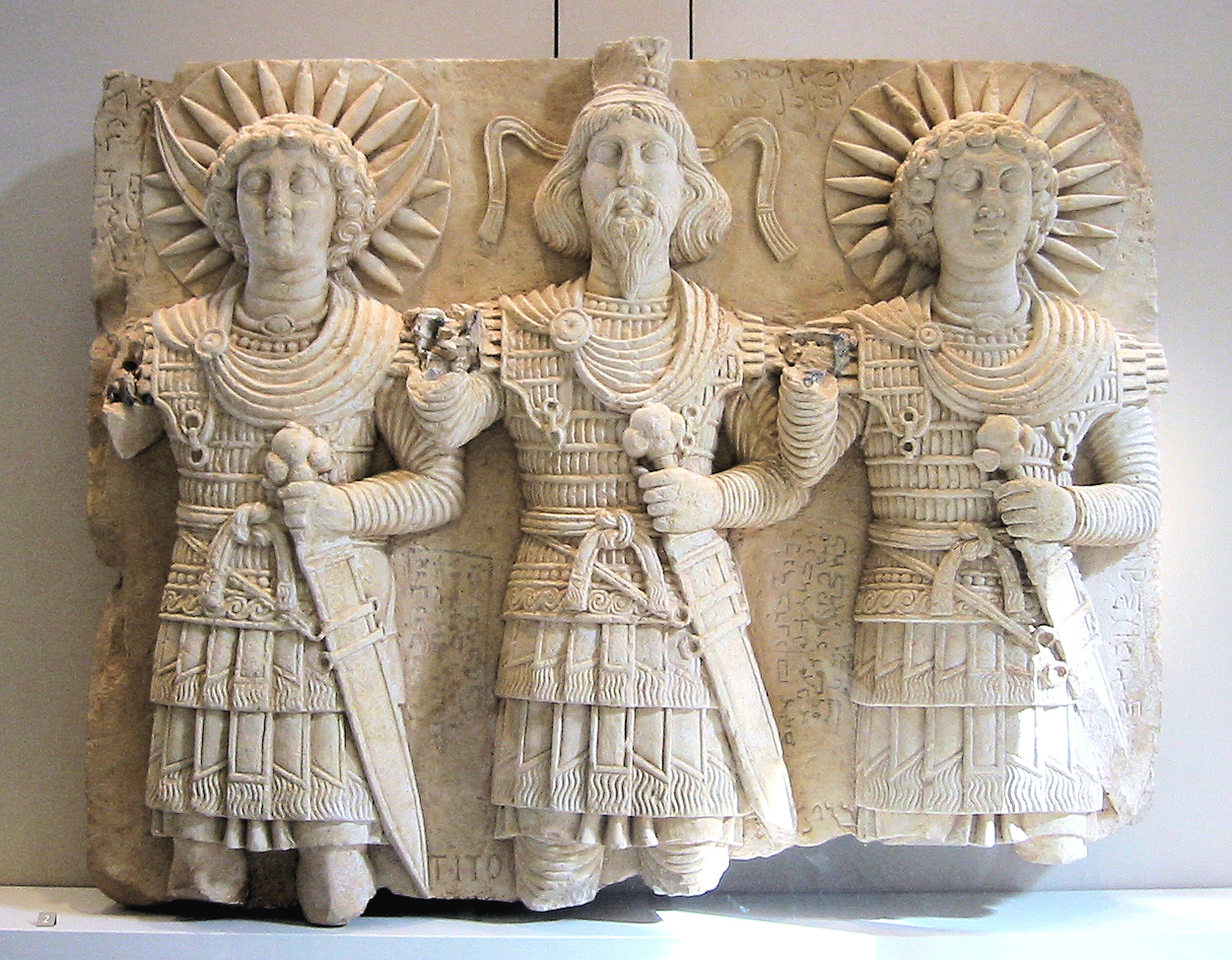
Aglibol, Baalshamin (center), and Malakbel (1st century; found near Palmyra, Syria)

Baalshamin (Imperial Aramaic: ܒܥܠ ܫܡܝܢ, romanized: Baʿal Šāmīn or Bʿel Šmīn, lit. 'Lord of Heaven[s]'), also called Baal Shamem (Phoenician: 𐤁𐤏𐤋 𐤔𐤌𐤌, romanized: Baʿl Šāmēm) and Baal Shamaim (Hebrew: בַּעַל שָׁמַיִם, romanized: Baʿal Šāmayīm), was a Northwest Semitic god and a title applied to different gods at different places or times in ancient Middle Eastern inscriptions, especially in Canaan/Phoenicia and Syria. The title was most often applied to Hadad, who is also often titled just Ba‘al. Baalshamin was one of the two supreme gods and the sky god of pre-Islamic Palmyra in ancient Syria (Bel being the other supreme god). There his attributes were the eagle and the lightning bolt, and he perhaps formed a triad with the lunar god Aglibol and the sun god Malakbel. The title was also applied to Zeus.

The earliest known Phoenician reference to Baalshamin is in the Yehimilk inscription, dated to the 10th century BCE.

== History ==
This name was originally a title of Baal Hadad, in the 2nd millennium BC, but came to designate a distinct god circa 1000 BC. The earliest known mention of this god or title is in a treaty of the 14th century BC between Suppiluliumas I, King of the Hittites, and Niqmaddu II, King of Ugarit. Although this could be a reference to Baal Hadad, and again when the name appears in a Phoenician inscription by King Yeḥimilk of Byblos, other texts make a distinction between the two.

In the treaty of 677 BC between King Esarhaddon of Assyria and King Ba‘al I of Tyre, a curse is laid against King Baal if he breaks the treaty, reading in part:

"May Baal-sameme, Baal-malage, and Baal-saphon raise an evil wind against your ships, to undo their moorings, tear out their mooring pole, may a strong wave sink them in the sea, a violent tide [. . .] against you."

The god Baal-malage is otherwise unexplained. Baal-saphon here and elsewhere seems to be Ba'al Hadad, whose home is on Mount Ṣaphon in the Ugaritic texts. But interpreters disagree as to whether these are here three separate gods or three aspects of the same god, a god who causes stormy weather on the sea.

In any case, inscriptions show that the cult of Ba'al Šamem continued in Tyre from Esarhaddon's day until towards the end of the 1st millennium BC.

Baalshamen is mentioned as an idol among other Aramean gods in Mesopotamia by Jacob of Serugh:

“He (that is Satan) put Apollo as idol in Antioch and others with him, In Edessa he set Nebo and Bel together with many others, He led astray Harran by Sin, Baalshamin and Bar Nemre[Nusku] By my Lord with his Dogs[Nergal] and the goddess Taratha[Astarte] and Gadlat."

In Sanchuniathon's main mythology the god he calls in Greek 'Uranus'/'Sky' has been thought by some to stand for Ba'al Šamem. Sky is here the actual father of Baal Hadad (although Baal Hadad is born after his mother's marriage to Dagon). As in Greek mythology and Hittite mythology, Sky is castrated by his son, who is in turn destined to be opposed by the thunder god. In Sanchuniathon's story, Sky also battles Sea; Sky finds himself unable to prevail, so he allies himself with Hadad.

In Nabatean texts in Greek, Baal Shamin is regularly equated with Zeus Helios, that is Zeus as a sun-god. Sanchuniathon supports this:

"... and that when droughts occurred, they stretched out their hands to heaven towards the sun; for him alone (he says) they regarded as god the lord of heaven, calling him Beelsamen, which is in the Phoenician language 'lord of heaven', and in Greek 'Zeus'."

Unfortunately, it is not clear whether Baalshamin is here regarded as a sun-god and the bringer of rain, or whether he is regarded as the cause of drought.

Writers in Syriac refer to Baalshamin as Zeus Olympios Zeus who shines.

== Pre-Islamic Arabia ==
Baʿal-Samīn is the central figure in Safaitic meteorological prayers. The name is not of Arabic origin: the element smn represents an Arabic adaptation of the Aramaic word for "heavens" (šamīn or šamēn). He is frequently attested with the epithet ʾlh sʿʿ ("god of Seia"), a reference to Seia (modern Sīʿ), a major religious sanctuary in the Ḥawrān region of southern Syria that was visited or venerated by these nomadic populations.

Over time, the theonym underwent partial Arabization. A minority of texts render the name as bʿlsmy (Baʿal-samāy), employing the native Arabic term for sky (samāʾ); this form, however, remained considerably less common than the established Aramaic loanword.

Within the corpus of Safaitic inscriptions, Baʿal-Samīn holds an almost exclusive monopoly over precipitation, with only a single known exception. He was additionally credited with imbuing the resulting water pools with healing properties. Blood sacrifice functioned as a transactional offering intended to induce Baʿal-Samīn to release rain. The appearance of the name Bʿlsmn within an inscription is understood to signify rain in the relevant area; rain was not conceived as a separate phenomenon dispatched by the deity, but rather as a direct, physical manifestation of Bʿlsmn himself.

In one inscription, Bʿlsmn is denounced as unjust and condemned by the worshipper before an assembly of seven other deities, who are invoked to intervene on behalf of the province's inhabitants in his stead.

== See also ==
- Temple of Baalshamin (not to be confused with the Temple of Bel)
- Bashamem inscription
