= Bashamem inscription =

Phoenician inscription found in Sardinia

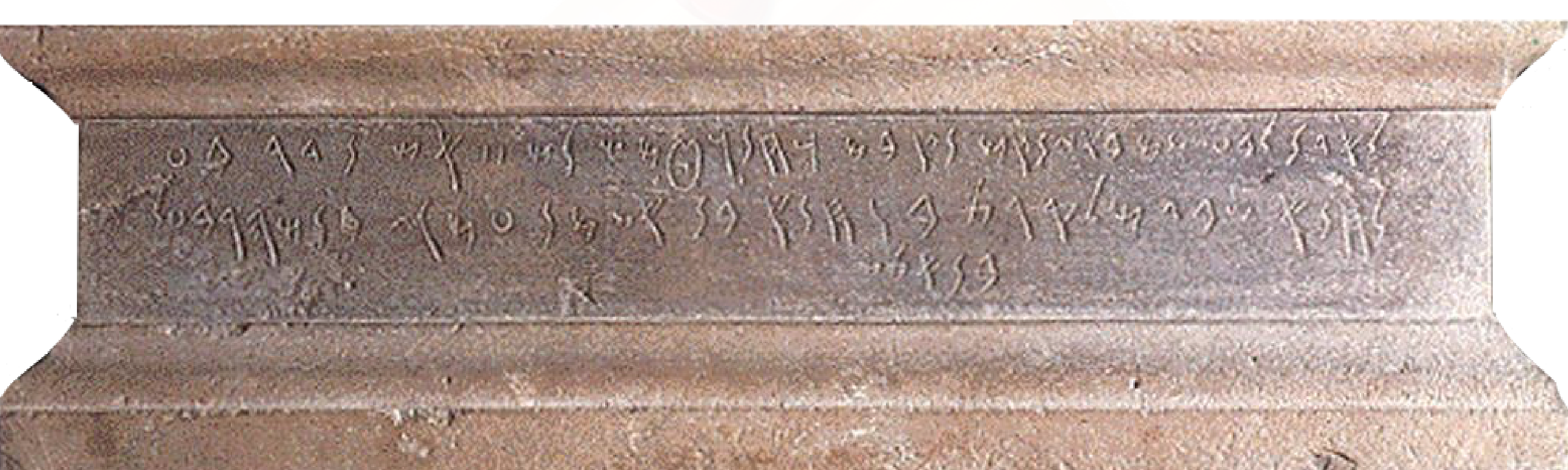
The Bashamem inscription

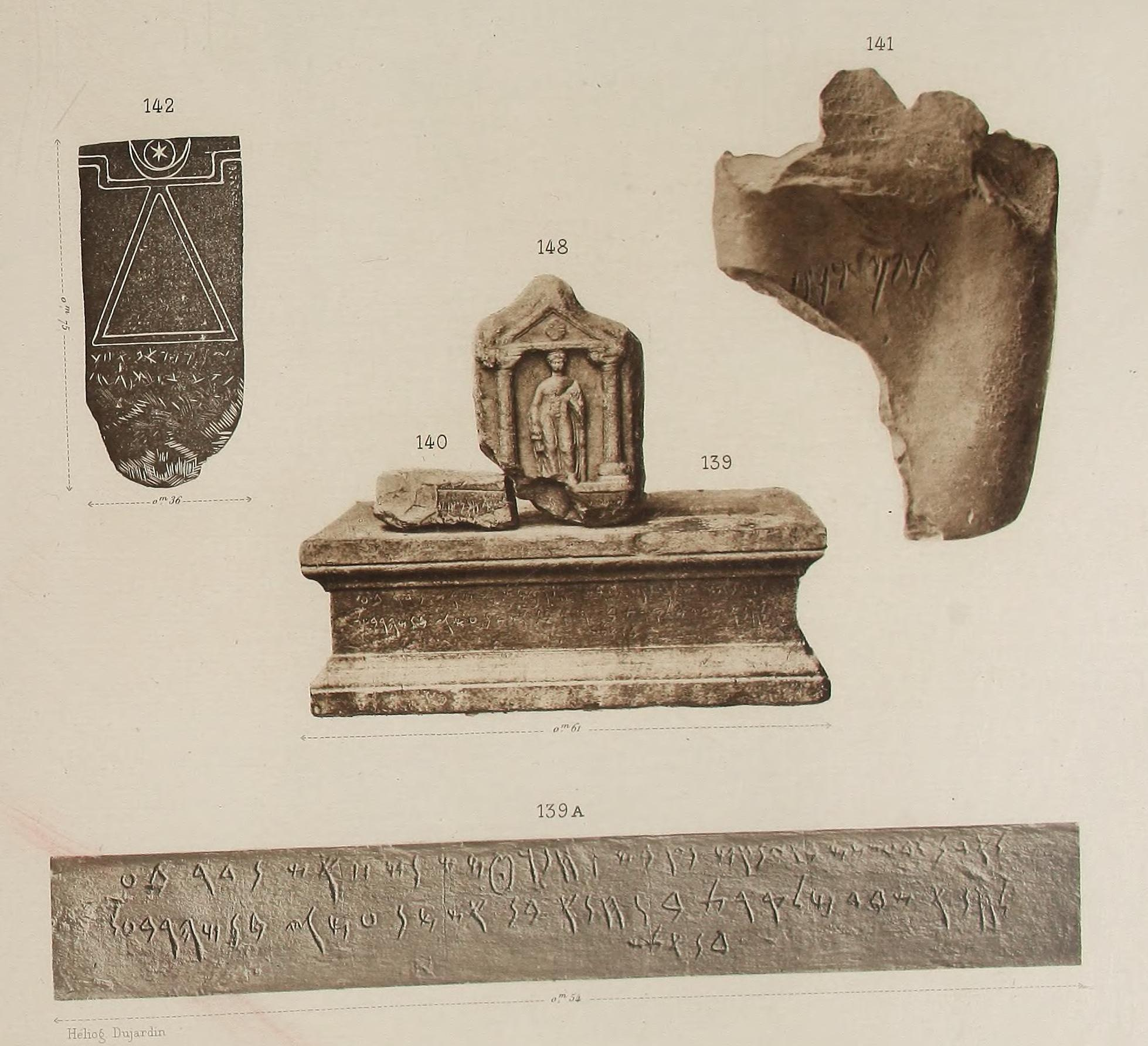
The inscription in the Corpus Inscriptionum Semiticarum, along with three other inscriptions

The Bashamem inscription or Baalshamam inscription is a Phoenician language inscription found in Cagliari, Sardinia in 1877. It is currently in the Museo Archeologico Nazionale di Cagliari.

It is engraved on a rectangular block of dolomite, 61 x 20 x 29 cm, with a cavity in the top for the insertion of a statue, sculpture or other votive object linked to the cult of divinity.

It was found in the Piazza Sant'Eulalia; although it was originally thought to have come from near the Chiesa della Santissima Annunziata

The inscription is thought to mention San Pietro Island, known in classical times as Hawk Island.

It is also known as KAI 64 or CIS I 139.

== Text of the inscription ==
Transcription	Translation
L’DN LB‘ŠMM B’YNṢM NṢBM [W]ḤN[W]ṬM ŠNM 2 ’Š NDR B‘ LḤN’ ŠBDMLQRT BN ḤN’ BN ’ŠMN‘MS BN MHRB‘L BN ’TŠ	To lord Bashamem, in Hawk Island, stelae and ḥnwṭs two (2), vowed the man Baa- -lhanno to Bodmelqart, son of Hanno, son of Eshmunamas, son of Maharbal, son of ’TŠ

== Bibliography ==
- Editio princeps: Elena, sopra una iscrizione fenicia scoperta in Cagliari : lettera al chiar . sig . cav . Gaetano Cara direttore del R. Museo archeologico di Cagliari . (28 pag . con tavola litogr . 4.) Livorno
- A. Stiglitz, Cagliari fenicia e punica in Rivista di Studi Fenici XXXV, 1-2007 Agnano Pisano (Pisa) 2009 pp. 54–57, fig. 6:3.
- E. Pais, Bibliografia, Corpus Inscriptionum..... in BAS Anno I Serie II ed. A. Forni, p. 185, Cagliari 1884.
- A. Taramelli, Guida del Museo Nazionale di Cagliari in Archivio Storico Sardo 1914 p. 264- 279 spec. p. 298.
- M.G. Amadasi Guzzo, IFPCO Sard. 23, Roma 1967 pp. 101–102 Tav. XXXV
