= Efqa Spring =

Water source in Syria

Efqa
- Afqa; Nabʿ Afqa; Ain al-Afqa; Efqa-Quelle إفقا
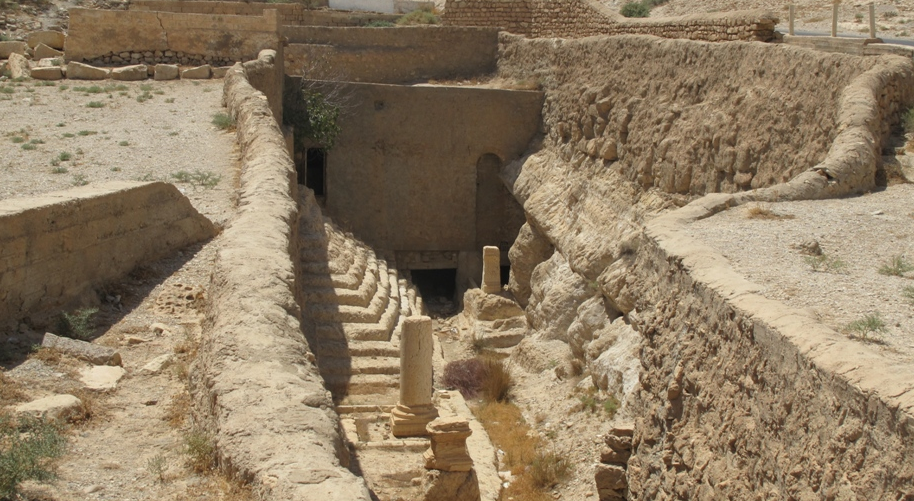
- Efqa, dry (2009)
- Interactive map of Efqa
- Coordinates: 34.5486°N 38.2593°E
- Type: Sulphured, warm

Efqa Spring (Arabic: إفقا) is an ancient artesian spring in the Syrian Desert that was first developed between 4000 BCE and 2000 BCE. Once upon a time the spring fed a natural stream that drained eastward into a brackish wetland. The ancient city of Palmyra developed around the oasis created by the spring water. Efqa comes from the Aramaic word meaning source.

The spring emerges on the west side of modern Tadmur, "opposite the modern building of the Cham Palace hotel, situated on the road to Damascus beyond the ruins of the ancient city." The spring flows out of the limestone inside al-Mintar Mountain via nine hand-dug wells that feed into a 400-meter-long cave, or underground irrigation channel, known as a qanat. A recent restoration project sought to undo some of the damage done by ISIS attacks in the area. The spring went dry in 1994, due to a combination of drought, over pumping, and neglect, but has been rehabilitated as the result of a joint Syrian–Russian restoration project and is flowing again as of 2019. Water from the spring is channeled into the 420 hectares (1,000 acres) of date palm and olive orchards surrounding the spring.

== History ==
According to historian Michał Gawlikowski, the maintenance of the spring was closely tied to the religious cult of ancient Tadmor (Palmyra to the Greeks and Romans and present-day English speakers):

One function of general interest was the supervision of the Efqa spring; the 'chief of the spring' was chosen every year by the god Yarhibol, probably through some rite of divination or drawing of sorts, and the same god provided him testimony at the end of his term. In one case at least, there were two chiefs at the same time...Duties of the appointees were no doubt related to the cult, but very likely they also supervised the distribution of water in the oasis, a task of utmost importance that was strictly regulated until very recently.

The channel into the mountain is features "small rock-cut chapels with incense altars (pyrat)" for offerings to Yarhibol. In addition to the main Efqa spring, the water infrastructure of Tadmor used two other qanats, underground channels fed by aquifer layers west and north of the oasis. These were possibly constructed under the emperor Hadrian, possibly with a grant from the emperor himself. One ran nine kilometers west to Riweisat, the other ran north and is called Biyar el‑Amye, which means wells of the blind. In an addition to providing water for the settlement, the water was distributed to farms on the outskirts that grew grain and vegetables for wealthy residents; itinerant shepherds were periodically allowed to graze and glean the enclosed fields since the goat and sheep manure that came with the herd was valuable fertilizer for next year's planting. There is also a second spring in the center of town but as of 1976 it was described as "not very abundant".

In addition to use as drinking water and for irrigation, the waters of Efqa were used therapeutically—the ancients carved benches in the stone basins containing the water so that they could bathe in the waters.

== Water profile ==
The spring water emerges from the vent at roughly 33 °C (91 °F). The mineralized water of the spring smells of hydrogen sulfide.

== Sources ==
- Gawlikowski, Michał (2021). Tadmor–Palmyra: A Caravan City Between East and West (PDF). Bibliotheca Artibus et Historiae. Kraków, Poland: IRSA Publishing House. ISBN 978-83-89831-40-8.
- Southern, Pat (2008). Empress Zenobia: Palmyra's Rebel Queen. Bloomsbury Academic. ISBN 9781847250346. LCCN 2009278864. OCLC 231585364.
- Stillwell, Richard; MacDonald, William L.; McAllister, Marian Holland, eds. (1976). "PALMYRA (Tadmor) Syria". The Princeton Encyclopedia of Classical Sites. Princeton, New Jersey: Princeton University Press. ISBN 0691035423. LCCN 75030210. OCLC 228664206 – via perseus.tufts.edu.
