= Yehimilk inscription =

10th-century BC Phoenician inscription

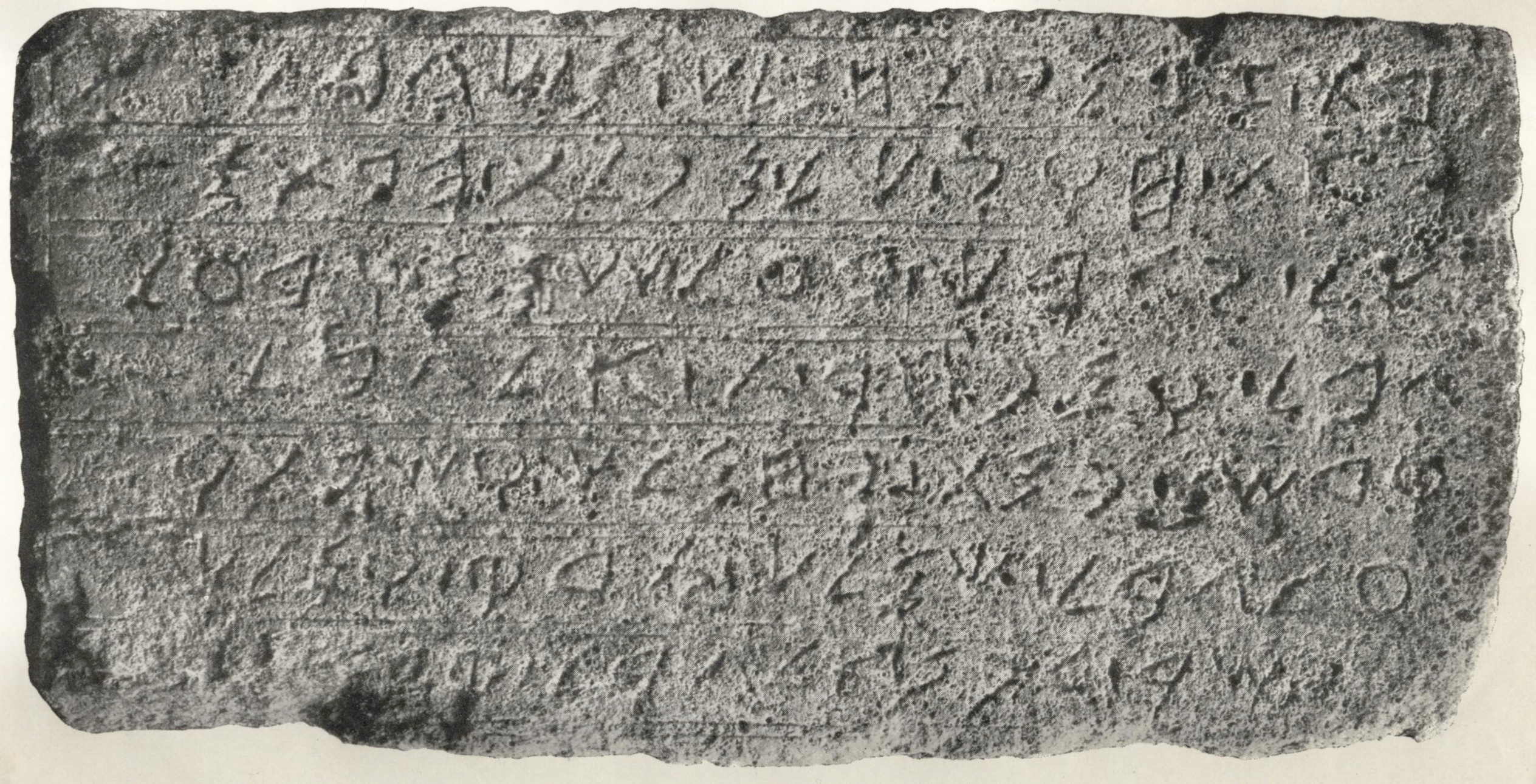
- Created: c. 955 BC
- Discovered: before 1931; Byblos, Keserwan-Jbeil, Lebanon
- Present location: Byblos, Keserwan-Jbeil, Lebanon

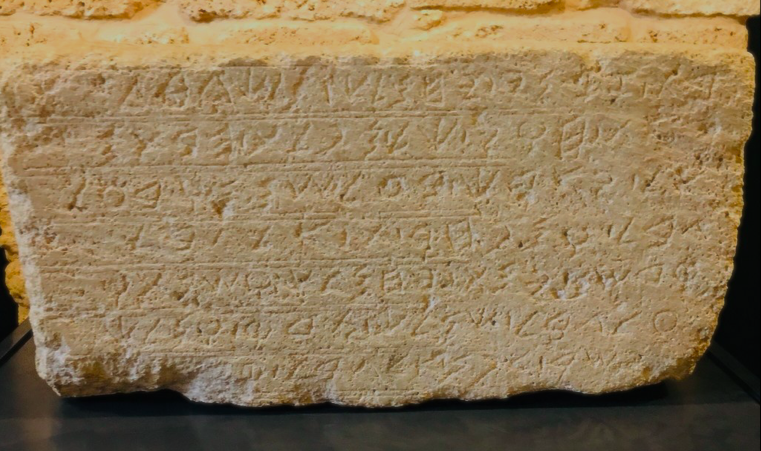
Yehimilk Phoenician Inscription in the Byblos Castle Museum

The Yehimilk inscription is a Phoenician inscription (KAI 4 or TSSI III 6) published in 1930, currently in the museum of Byblos Castle.

It was published in Maurice Dunand's Fouilles de Byblos (volume I, 1926–1932, numbers 1141, plate XXXI).

It is dated to the 10th century BC, and contains the earliest known Phoenician reference to Baalshamin. This name was originally a title of Baal Hadad, in the 2nd millennium BC, but it came to designate a distinct god circa 1000 BC.

== Text of the inscription ==
The inscription reads:

BT Z BNY YḤMLK MLK GBL
[This is] the temple that he has built, Yehimilk, king of Byblos.

H’T ḤWY KL MPLT HBTM / ’L
It was he who restored all these ruins of temples.

Y’RK B‘L-ŠMM WB‘L(T) / GBL
May they [the gods] prolong —Baalsamem, and Ba'al(at) Gebal,

WMPḤRT ’L GBL / QDŠM
and the assembly of the holy gods of Byblos—

YMT YḤMLK WŠNTW / ‘L GBL
[may these gods prolong] Yehimilk's days and his years over Byblos,

K MLK ṢDQ WMLK / YŠR
because [he is] a just king and a righteous king

LPN ’L GBL QDŠM [H’]
before the holy gods of Byblos, he.

== Bibliography ==
- Christopher Rollston, "The Dating of the Early Royal Byblian Phoenician Inscriptions: A Response to Benjamin Sass." MAARAV 15 (2008): 57–93.
- Benjamin Mazar, The Phoenician Inscriptions from Byblos and the Evolution of the Phoenician-Hebrew Alphabet, in The Early Biblical Period: Historical Studies (S. Ahituv and B. A. Levine, eds., Jerusalem: IES, 1986 [original publication: 1946]): 231–247.
- William F. Albright, The Phoenician Inscriptions of the Tenth Century B.C. from Byblus, JAOS 67 (1947): 153–154.
- Corinne Bonnet. Existe-t-il un B'l gbl. à Byblos. À propos de l'inscription de Yehimilk (KAI 4). Ugarit-Forschungen, 1993, 25, pp.25-34. ⟨hal-01865311⟩
