= Aglibol =

Syrian deity of the Moon

- God of the Moon
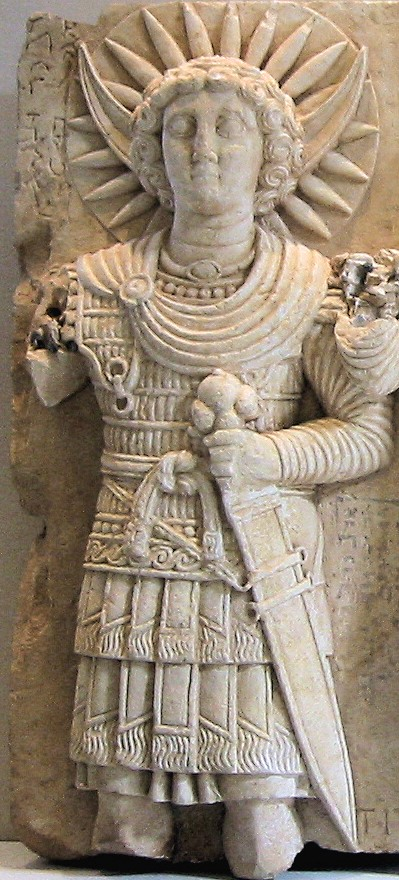
- Aglibol, as shown in a 1st century CE relief from Palmyra
- Major cult center: Palmyra
- Symbol: Lunar halo, crescent moon

Genealogy
- Siblings: Malakbel

Aglibol (Palmyrene Aramaic: 𐡰𐡢𐡫𐡡𐡥𐡫 ʿGLBWL; عجل بعل) is a god from Palmyra, originating from a people in what is now northwestern Syria. He is a moon god who was worshiped in the ancient Syrian city of Palmyra as part of a triad alongside Bel and Yarhibol, and associated with the sun god Malakbel.

Evidence of Aglibol's worship is primarily epigraphical. The earliest known mention of Aglibol was an inscription which dates back to 17 BCE and associates him with the sun god Malakbel. Several other inscriptions made by the Bene Komare also associate him with Malakbel, including a bilingual inscription from 122 CE in which Aglibol and Malakbel sponsor a citizen by the name of Manai for his piety.

Several second century CE inscriptions attest that Aglibol was venerated with Malakbel in a sanctuary known as the "Sacred Garden" (gnt' 'ilym), which was one of the four principal sanctuaries of the city. The Bene Komare tended to this sanctuary.

The sanctuary had two altars, a sacred cypress and a bath. One of the reliefs found in the Temple of Bel show the two altars and the two gods.

== See also ==
- List of angels in theology
- List of lunar deities
