= Malakbel =

Palmyrene deity

- God of the sun, vegetation, welfare and angel of Bel
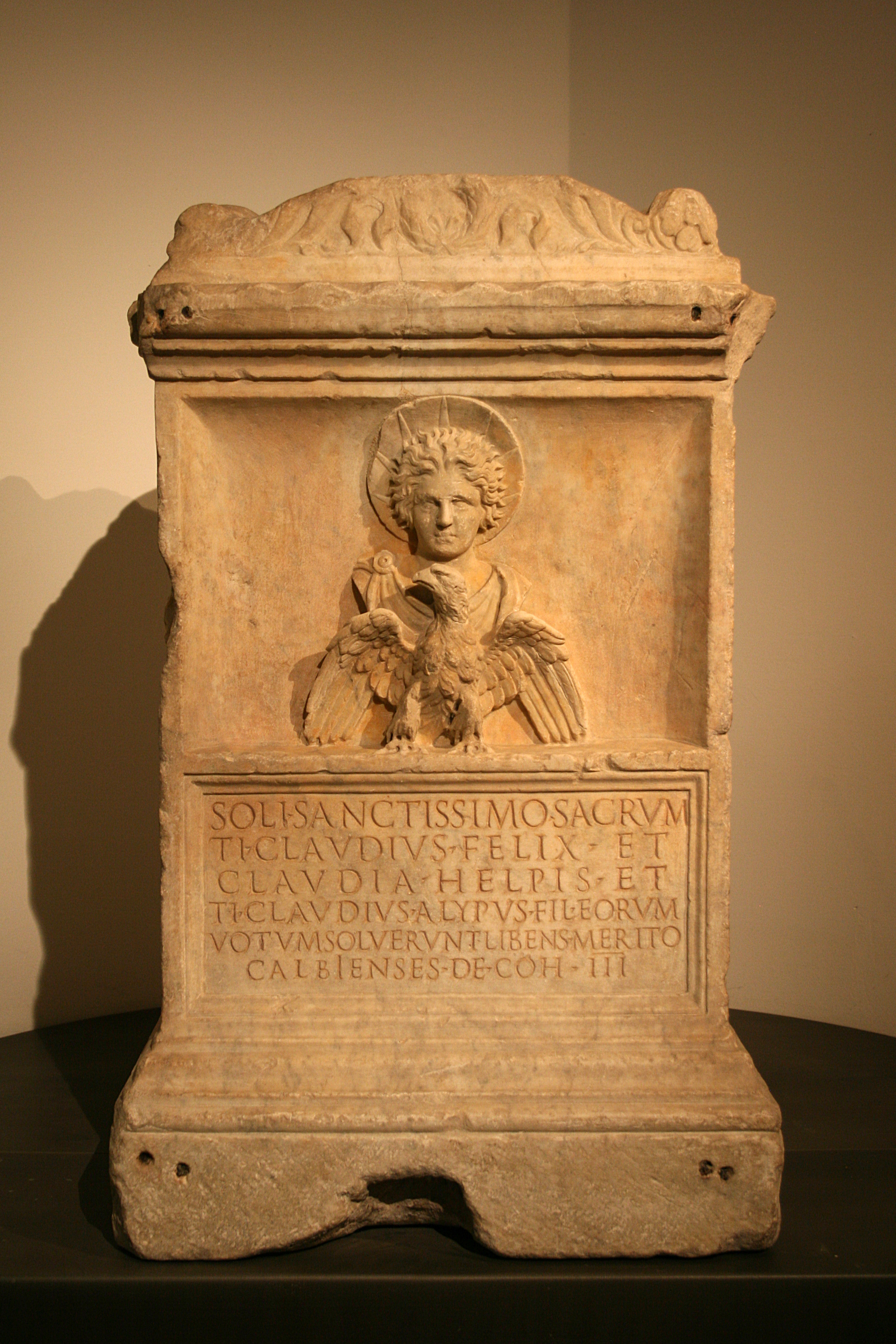
- Roman altar with a dedication in Latin to Sol Sanctissimus. On the left side (not visible) is a Palmyrene inscription with a similar dedication to Malakbel. Second half of the 1st century AD.
- Major cult center: Palmyra
- Symbol: Solar halo, eagle

Genealogy
- Siblings: Aglibol

Equivalents
- Roman: Sol

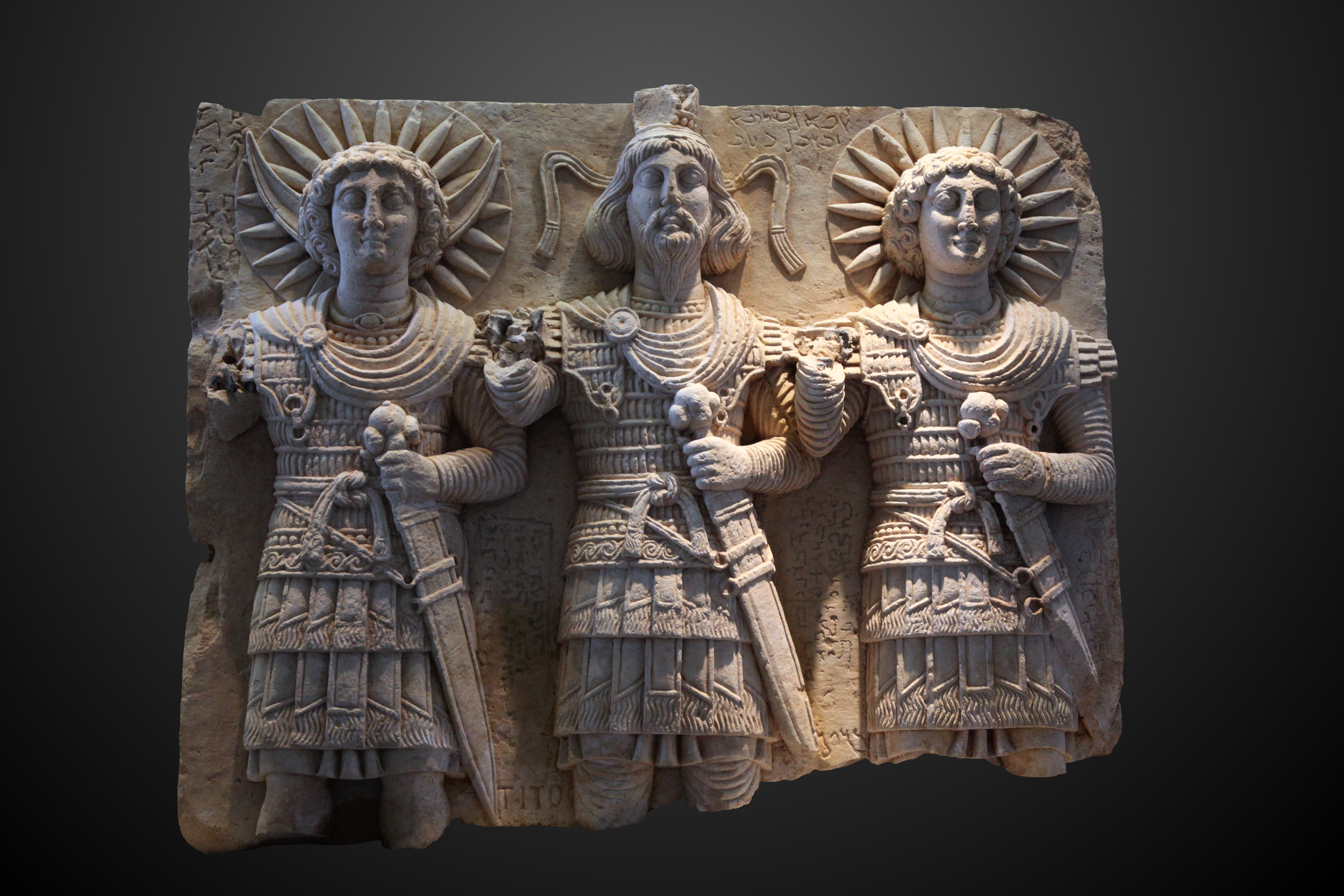
1st century AD relief from Palmyra depicting, from left to right, Aglibol, Baalshamin, and Malakbel

Malakbel (Palmyrene Aramaic 𐡬𐡫𐡪𐡡𐡫 mlkbl) was a sun god worshipped in the ancient Syrian city of Palmyra, frequently associated and worshipped with the moon god Aglibol as a part of a trinity involving the sky god Baalshamin.

== Etymology ==
Malakbel's name means "Messenger of Baal", attesting to his mythological role as Bel's messenger and acolyte.

== Archaeological evidence ==
The earliest known mention of Malakbel was an inscription which dates back to 17 BC and associates him with the lunar god Aglibol. Several other inscriptions made by the Bene Komare also associate him with Aglibol, including a bilingual inscription from 122 AD in which Aglibol and Malakbel sponsor a citizen by the name of Manai for his piety.

Attestations of Malakbel's worship can be found in Rome, and as far as the province of Numidia in north Africa, as attested by a circa 178 AD inscription in the town of El Kantara, where Palmyrene archers were stationed.

=== Sanctuaries ===
==== In Palmyra ====
Several second century AD inscriptions from the city attest that Aglibol was venerated with Malakbel in a sanctuary known as the "Holy Garden" which was one of the four principle sanctuaries of the city. The Bene Komare, well-known devotees of the gods Malakbel and Aglibol, tended to this sanctuary.

The sanctuary had two altars, and a sacred cypress. One of the reliefs found in the Temple of Bel show the sanctuary's two altars and depictions of the two gods. The sanctuary also had a bath, as attested by an 182 AD inscription mentioning Thomallachis, daughter of Haddudan, who contributed 2500 denarii towards the construction of the bath of Aglibol and Malakbel.

==== In Rome ====
A shrine of Malakbel is attested around the early 2nd century AD in Rome. The shrine was located on the right bank of the Tiber river, in the vicinity of several wine warehouses. There, Malakbel was frequently identified with the Roman divinity Sol, known as Deus Sol Sanctissimus, and occasionally bore the epithet "Invictus".

== Malakbel and Sol Invictus ==
In 274, following his victory over the Palmyrene Empire, emperor Aurelian dedicated a large temple to Sol Invictus in Rome; most scholars consider Aurelian's Sol Invictus to be of Syrian origin, either a continuation of the cult of Sol Invictus Elagabalus, or Malakbel of Palmyra, as Malakbel was frequently identified with the Roman god Sol and bore the epithet Invictus. Another one of his names, "Sanctissimus", was an epithet Aurelian bore on an inscription from Capena.

The relation between Malakbel and Sol Invictus, if any, can not be confirmed and will probably remain unresolved.

== See also ==
- List of solar deities

== See also ==
- Yarhibol
- Aglibol
- Bene Komare
