= Yarhibol =

Aramean god

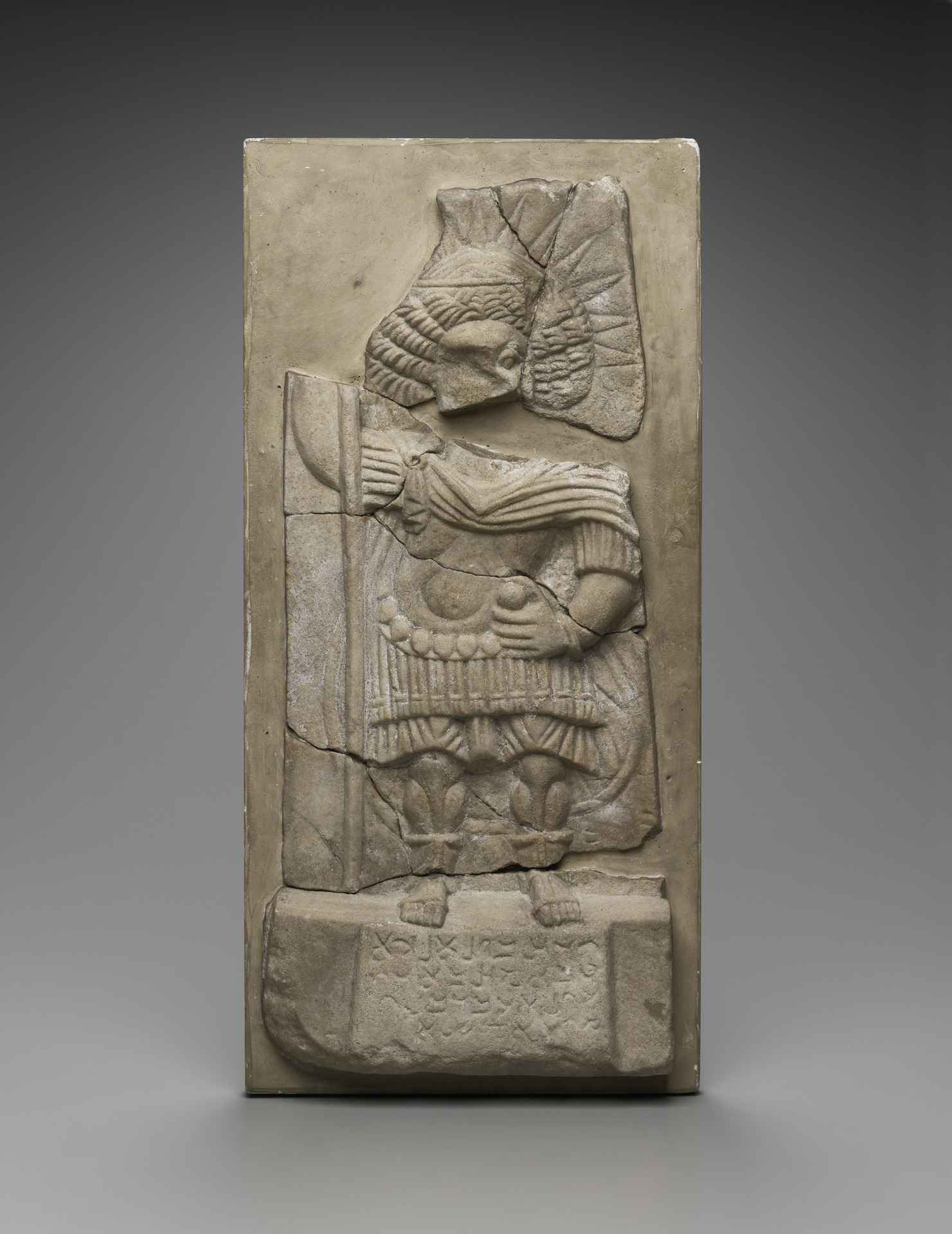
Relief depicting Yarhibol from the Temple of the Gadde, Dura-Europos, circa 150 BC

Yarhibol or Iarhibol is an Aramean god who was worshiped mainly in ancient Palmyra, a city in central Syria. He was depicted with a solar nimbus and styled "lord of the spring". He normally appears alongside Bel, who was a co-supreme god of Palmyra, and Aglibol, one of the other top Palmyrene gods.

== Origins ==
It is believed that Yarhibol was originally the patronus/genius loci of the source Efqa in Palmyra; it is known that his title was "Lord / Guardian [Gad] of the Source". In general, however, his onomastics indicates an earlier connection with the lunar, not the solar, cult. His name translates as "the moon of Bel", and at the same time shows a connection with the North-Western Semitic (Canaanite) moon god Jarih (Yariḫ). (Note: Worshiped by the Phoenicians and whose name (Jarah / Jerah / Jorah) has left an imprint on the geographical name "Jericho".) It is characteristic that on the stele in Dura Europos (2nd century AD), apart from the radiant crown, it is additionally decorated with a crescent.

Earlier Yarhibol must have been a local deity of ancestors in a desert oasis, worshiped by the descendants of the first settlers and appeared in the form of a Baetylus. In a stele of the Temple of the Gadde in Dura Europos, Yarhibol is described as "good god". Being the custodian of a healing spring—a place special for the desert inhabitants, with time he also got the function of the supreme (divine) judge and acquired prophetic qualities (giving divinations), which was usually associated with the aspect characteristic of a solar deity. Over time, this was also reflected in his cult imaginations and ideological kinship with the Greek god Apollo.

== Iconography ==
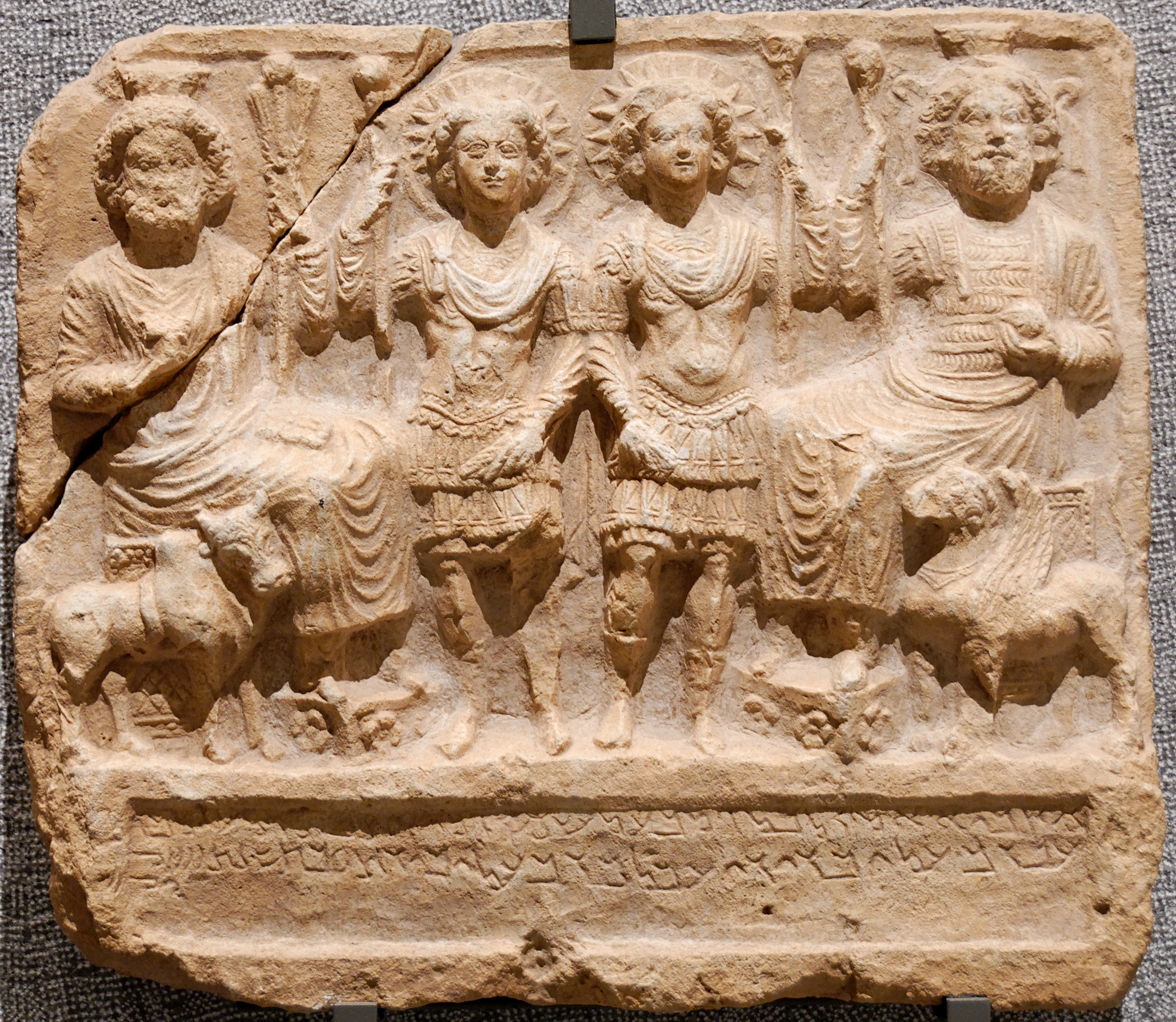
Yarhibol (second from left) among other Palmyrene deities (Bel, Aglibol, Baalshamin) on Ba'alay votive relief from AD 121 (Lyon Fine Arts Museum)

In Palmyra, Yarhibol generally never appears on bust reliefs. The oldest image on the local relief from the 1st century BC shows him in a Greek chiton and himation, with a palm branch in his hand—in a pacifist form. A different iconography is reflected in the canon of representations from the 1st–3rd century AD, when both group and individual images show him with armament and Roman military outfit. (Note: Eg, as a guardian deity accompanying a local warrior - as in the Palmyrenian relief of the cult Shokai of Hairan's son from the 2nd century AD (Sztuka Palmyry ... , op. Cit., P. 43, cat. No. 32).)

As a rule, however, Yarhibol appears in a triad, along with another ancient local deity—Aglibol (god of the moon), and accompanying the supreme deity—Bel. As a local tribal god, Yarhibol remained slightly against both of them. Although the Baalshamin triad was worshiped at Palmyra, this apparently did not prevent the same veneration of both supreme gods, (Note: M. Gawlikowski, The Art of Syria, p. 227; "But while the worship of Bel was official and applied to all inhabitants, the sanctuary of Baalshamin belonged to one of the tribes." - ibid.) and a telling testimony is the Ba'alay votive relief from the Lyon Fine Arts Museum, showing the unusual combination of these deities from both triads. Jarhibol, in trinity with Baalshamin and Aglibol, appears (alongside local Parthian deities) also in Dura Europos, in the Temple of the Gadde.

In addition, Yarhibol also had his own triad, in which he is shown with various deities: above all with Aglibol (always standing at his right hand) and with the goddess Arsu, thus creating the symbolic Sun-Moon-Earth cosmic group. He may also be accompanied by the goddess Belti (the female equivalent of Bela, equated with Venus) or Atargatis. Among the not uncommon multi-figure representations (Note: Eg the votive relief of Ahya and Jarhai shows him among the four deities - also with the goddess Arsu (The Art of Palmyra ... , op. Cit ., P. 43, cat. No. 35).) appears together with Hercules or with the goddess Semia (juxtaposed with the Greek Athena). However, no common depictions with Malakbel were found.

== Cult ==
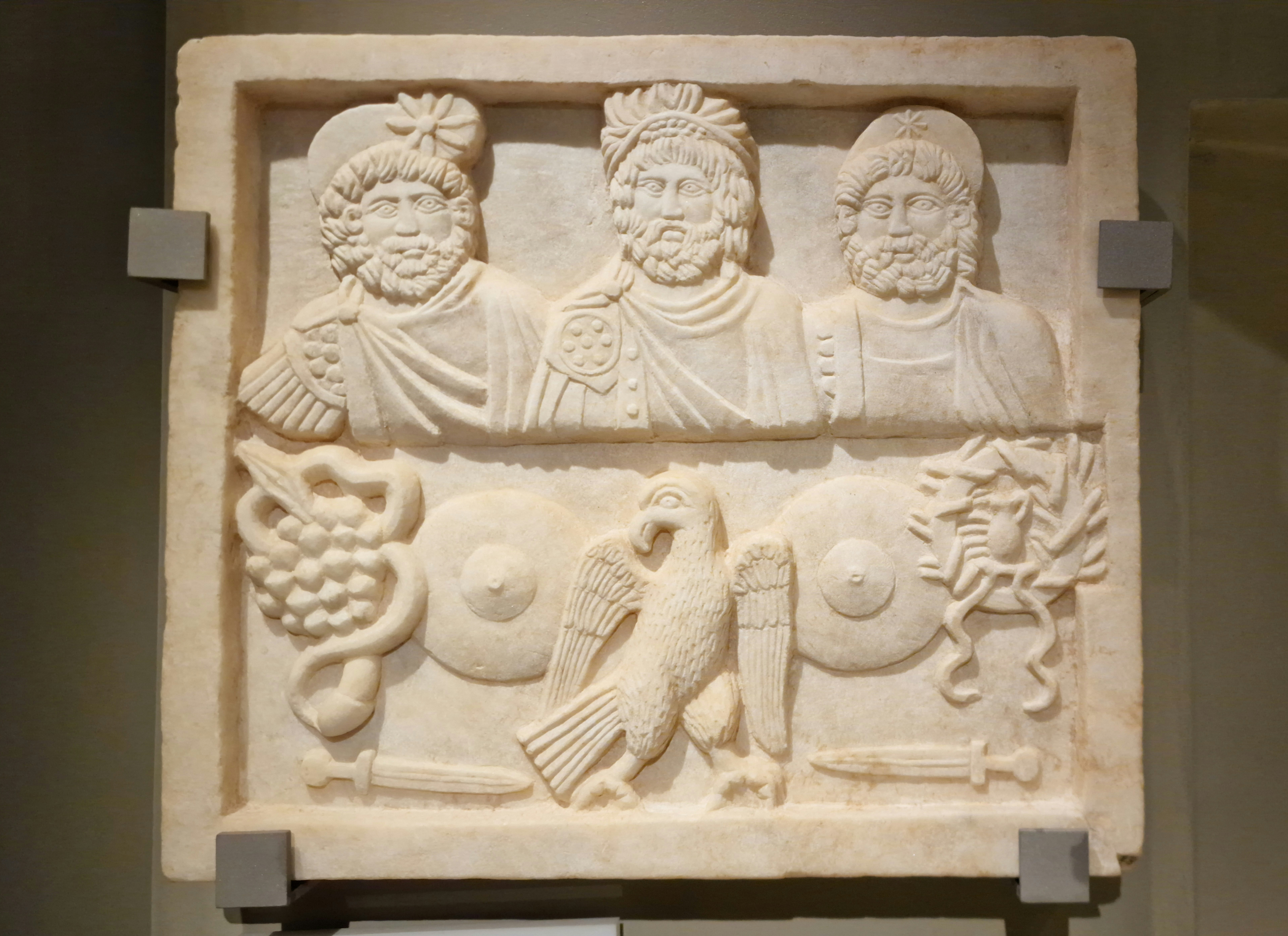
Marble relief of the 4th-century with the Trinity of Palmyra in the Acropolis Museum, Athens.

It seems that Yarhibol's cult was long entrenched in Palmyra, since he was worshiped by the Amorites, who are considered the earliest known inhabitants of the area. Until a specific iconography of the deity was created, he was undoubtedly worshiped in the form of Baetylus. It is assumed that in the cella of the Palmyrene temple of Bel, the northern niche contained the statues of the trinity of gods, including Yarhibol. The material confirmation of the local cult were found in form of olive votive lamps with his representations and relevant inscriptions, as well as temple tesserae, on which Yarhibol is featured, for example, with Aglibol and in the Bela triad. The popularity of this deity would also be emphasized by the use of his name as a proper name by the inhabitants of Palmyra, as evidenced in the discovered local inscriptions.

The caravan route contributed to a certain spread, or at least to transfer, of his cult further east, as evidenced by its finding in the sanctuary in Dura Europos discovered by JH Breasted and F. Cumont. The dating of local frescoes shows that the cult of the Palmyrene triad in the Roman era was maintained there at least during the 2nd century AD (after 145).

Yarhibol artifacts from Dura Europos

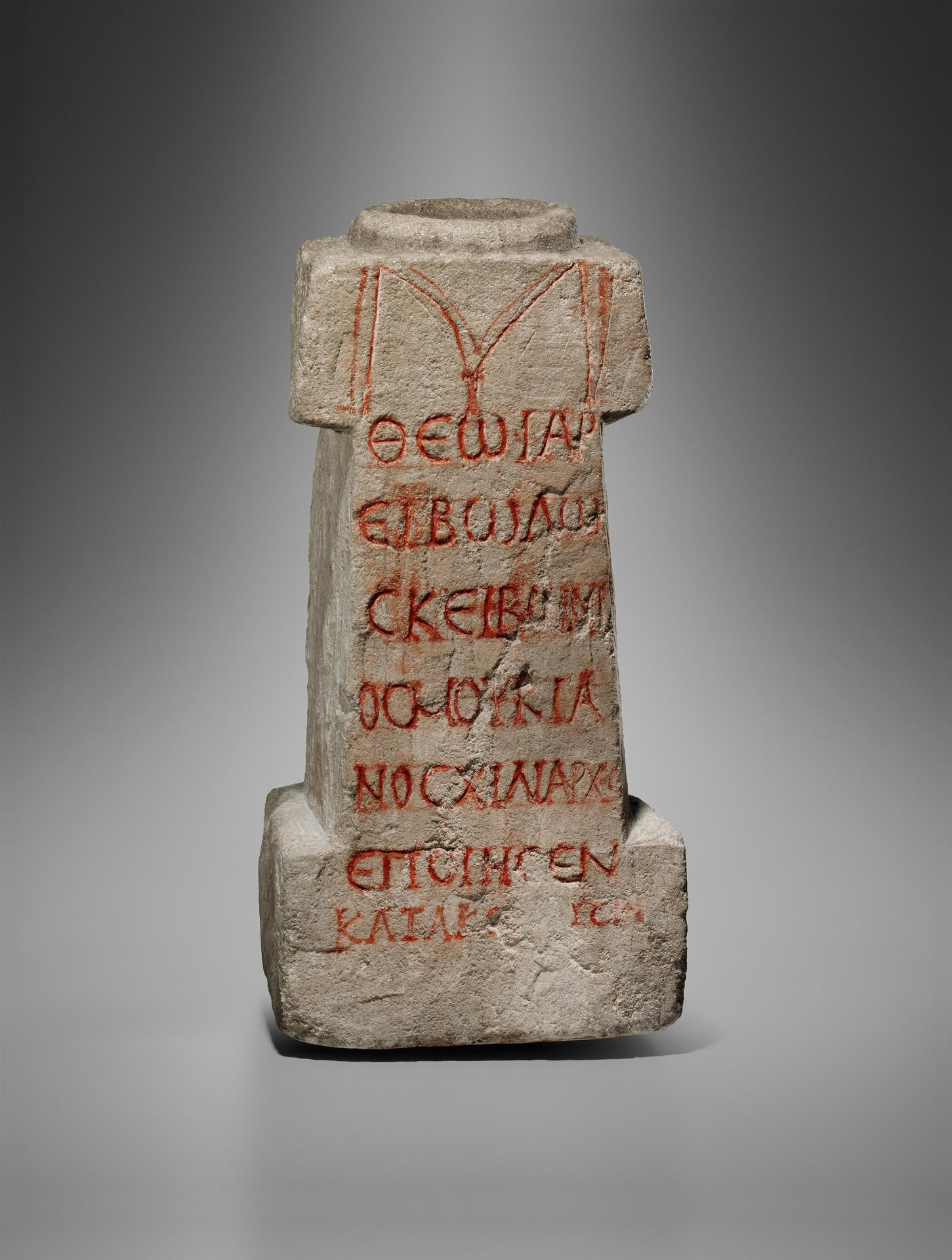
Altar of Yarhibol found in the Temple of Bel, Dura-Europos. The Greek inscription reads: "[For] the god Iarhibol, Scribonius Moucianus, chiliarch, made this as commanded." Thus, a Latin-named dedicant, who holds a Greek-titled office in the Roman army, records his offering to the Palmyrene god Yarhibol in Greek."

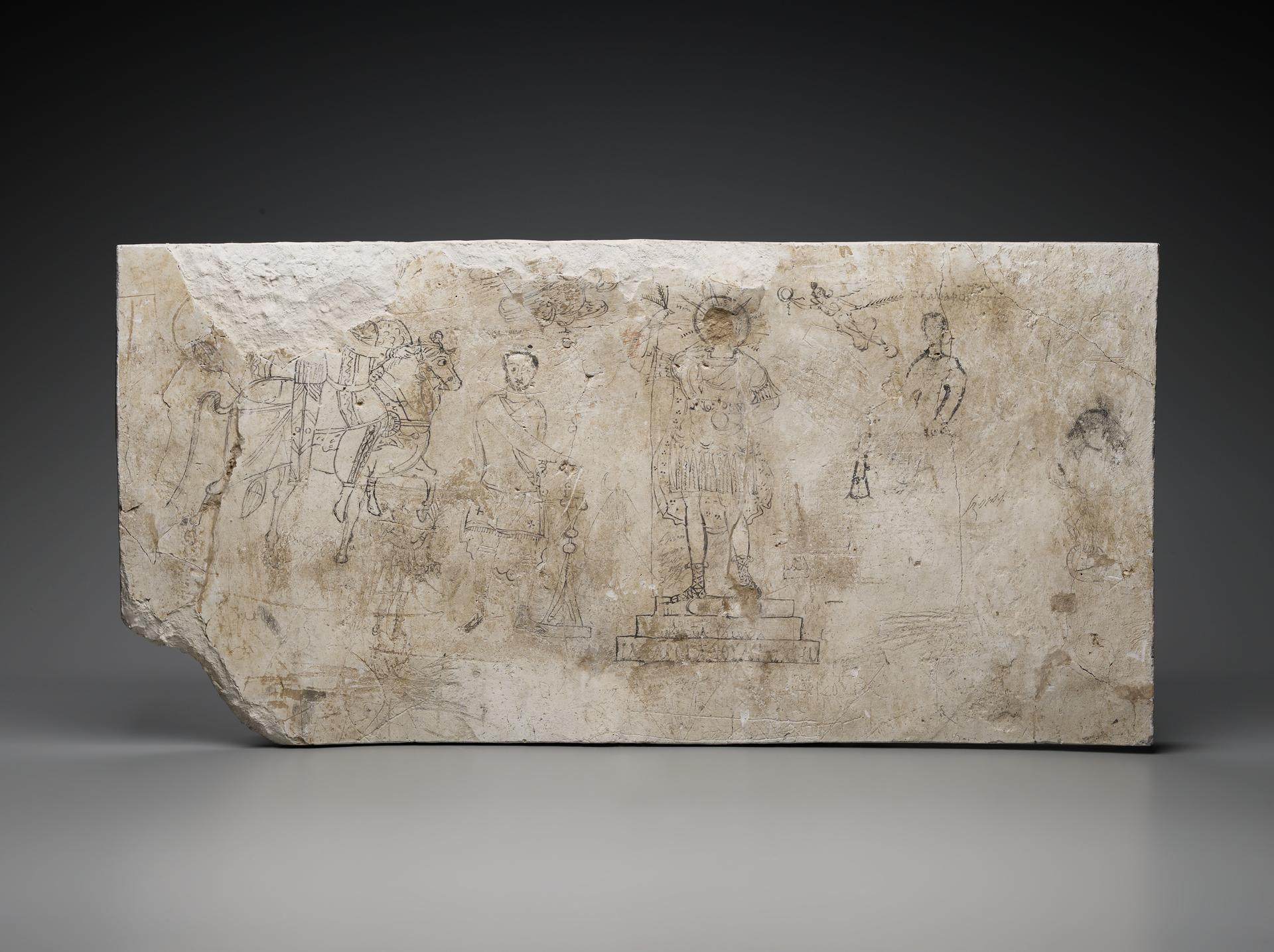
Depinto Scene of Sacrifice. Found in the Temple of Artemis Azzanathkona, this painting shows Yarhibol standing on a pedestal and wearing Roman military garb, with solar rays around his head and a sheaf of wheat in his hand. He is crowned by the goddess Victory, approaching from one direction, and an eagle from the other. Worshippers on either side burn incense on thymiaterias (incense burners). The man on horseback advancing from the left wears Palmyrene dress and is clearly a figure of importance.

== Parallels in Mandaeism ==
Nasoraia (2022) and van Rompaey (2011) note many resemblances regarding the names and artistic depictions of Yarhibol and the Mandaean uthra Hibil Ziwa (also known as Yawar-Hibil when combined with the epithet Yawar).

== See also ==
- Malakbel
- Almaqah
- Mokha
- Hibil Ziwa
- List of angels in theology

== Sources ==
- Elżbieta Łukasiak, Ikonografia Jarhibola, "Studia Palmyreńskie" V (1974), ss. 7-44
- H. J. W. Drijvers, The Religion of Palmyra (Iconography of religions), Leiden 1976
- Javier Teixidor, The Pantheon of Palmyra (Études préliminaires aux religions orientales dans l'Empire romain 79), Leiden 1979
- Michał Gawlikowski, Sztuka Syrii, Warszawa 1976
- Sztuka Palmyry ze zbiorów Arabskiej Republiki Syryjskiej. 50 lat polskich wykopalisk na Bliskim Wschodzie [katalog wystawy w Muzeum Narodowym], Warszawa 1986
- Clark Hopkins, The Palmyrene Gods at Dura-Europos, "Journal of the American Oriental Society" t. 51/2 (1931), ss. 119-137
