= Bel (mythology) =

Title applied to various gods of ancient Mesopotamian religions

Bêl (/ˈbeɪl/; from Akkadian: bēlu) is a title signifying 'lord' or 'master' applied to various gods in the Mesopotamian religion of Akkad, Assyria, and Babylonia. The feminine form is Bêlit ('Lady, Mistress') in Akkadian. Bel is represented in Greek as Belos and in Latin as Belus. Belit appears in Greek form as Beltis (Βελτις). Linguistically, Bel is an East Semitic form cognate with the Northwest Semitic Baal with the same meaning.

Bel was especially used for the Babylonian god Marduk in Assyrian and neo-Babylonian personal names or mentioned in inscriptions in a Mesopotamian context. Similarly, Bêlit mostly refers to Marduk's spouse Sarpanit. Marduk's mother, the Sumerian goddess often referred to in the Sumerian language as Ninhursag, Damkina, and Ninmah, was often known as Belit-ili ('Lady of the Gods') in Akkadian.

Other gods called "Lord" were sometimes identified totally or in part with Bel Marduk. The god Malak-bel of Palmyra is an example, attested as a messenger of Bel but existing as a deity separate to Bel/Marduk. Similarly, Zeus Belus mentioned by Sanchuniathon as born to Cronus/El in Peraea is unlikely to be Marduk. Early translators of Akkadian believed that the ideogram for the god called Enlil in Sumerian was to be read as Bel in Akkadian. Current scholarship holds this as incorrect, but Bel is used in referring to Enlil in older translations and discussions.

In Mandaean cosmology, the name for Jupiter is Bil (ࡁࡉࡋ), which is derived from the name Bel.

== Bel of Palmyra, Syria ==
A god named Bel was the chief-god of Palmyra, Syria in pre-Hellenistic times; the deity was worshipped alongside the gods Aglibol and Yarhibol. He was originally known as Bol, after the Northwestern Semitic word Ba'al (usually used to refer to the god Hadad), until the cult of Bel-Marduk spread to Palmyra; by 213 BC, Bol was renamed to Bel. The Temple of Bel in Palmrya, Syria was dedicated to this god. The temple has since been destroyed by ISIS.

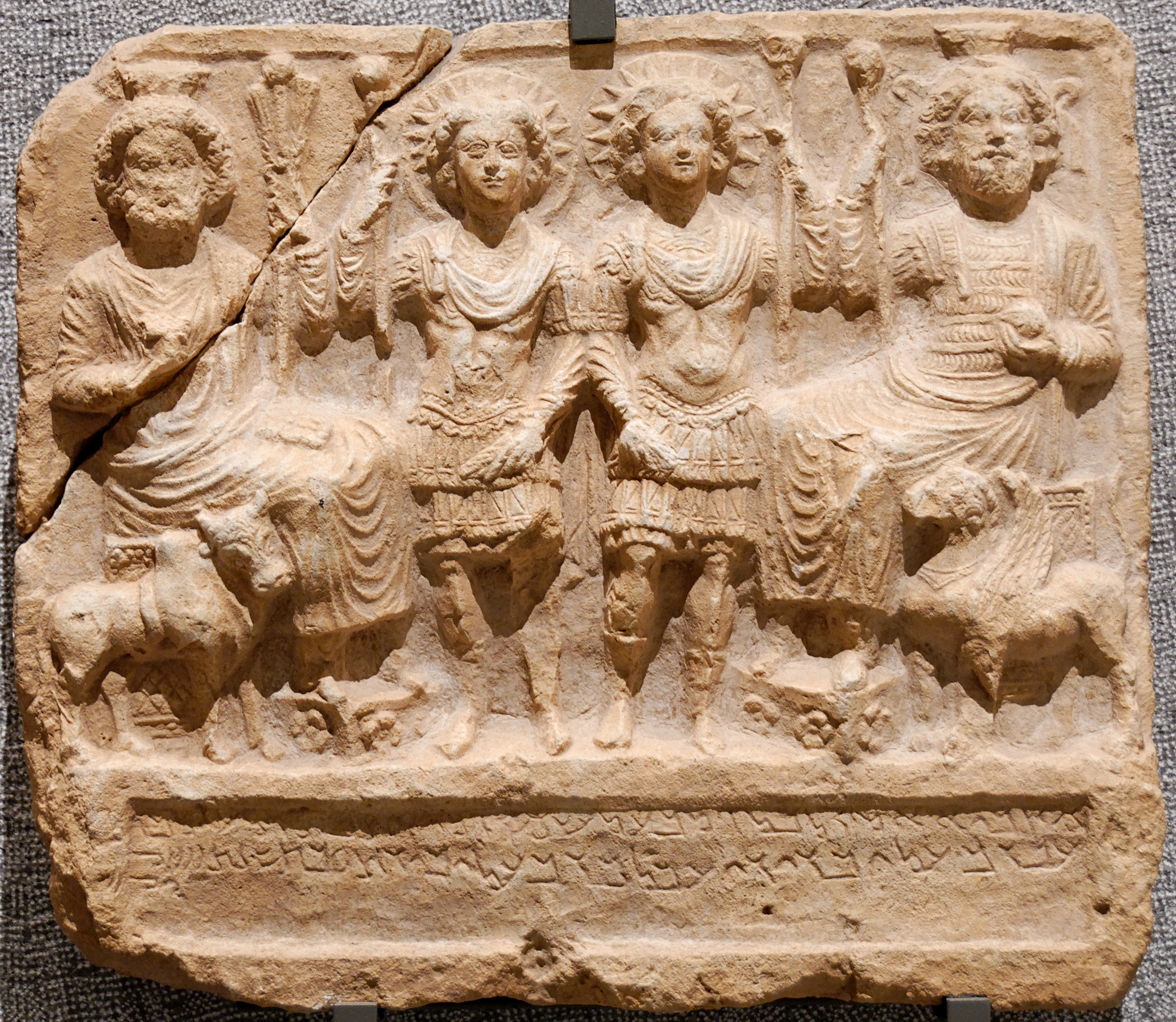
Bel of Palmyra, Syria, depicted on the far left alongside Ba'alshamin, Yarhibol and Aglibol on a relief from Palmyra

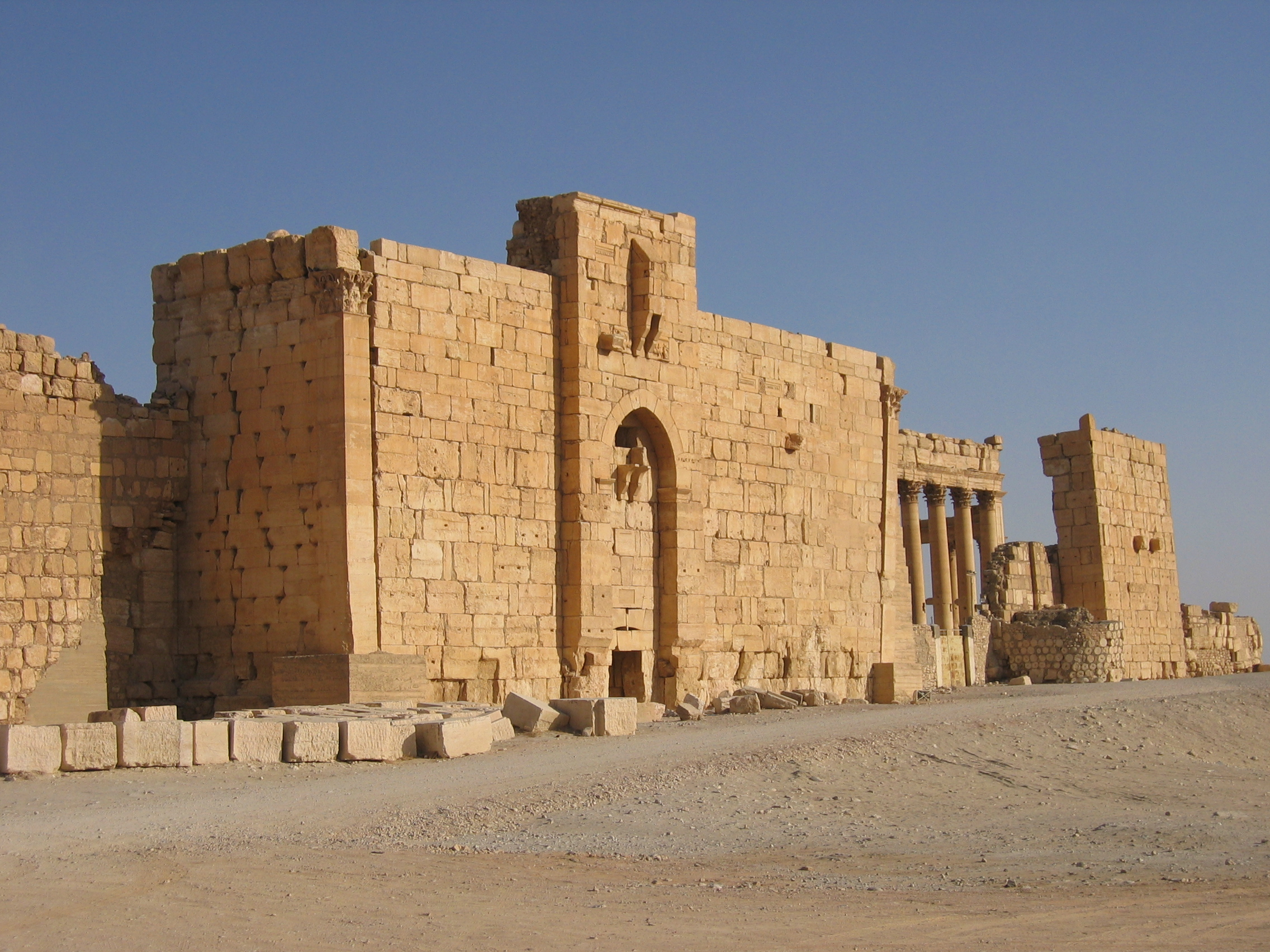
Fortified gate of the Temple of Bel in Palmyra, Syria. A Palmyrene inscription is shown on the bottom.

== See also ==
- Ba‘al
- Bel and the Dragon
- Belial
- Belus (disambiguation)
  - Belus (Assyrian)
  - Belus (Babylonian)
  - Belus (Egyptian)
- EN (cuneiform)
- Marduk
- List of Mesopotamian deities
