= Kosovo–Syria relations =

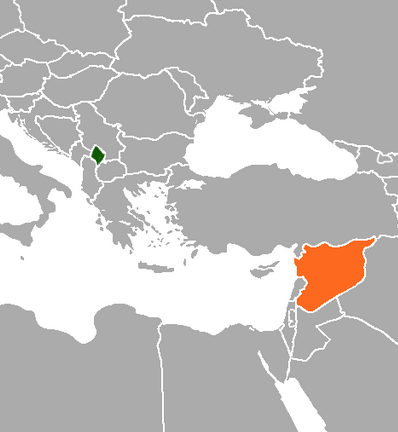
- Kosovo: Syria

Kosovo–Syria relations are the bilateral relations between Kosovo and Syria. Syria formally recognized Kosovo as an independent state on 29 October 2025.

== Relations during the Assad regime ==
When Kosovo declared its independence from Serbia on 17 February 2008, the Assad regime, which was backed by Russia, an ally of Serbia, did not recognize Kosovo's independence.

On 13 May 2009, Ba'athist Syria's ambassador to Serbia, Majed Shadoud, reported that Syrian president Bashar al-Assad told Serbian Foreign Minister Vuk Jeremić that his country continues to oppose the recognition of the independence of Kosovo. Shadoud quoted al-Assad as saying "Syria urges a political solution for the situation in the Balkans and the Middle East and is opposed to any kind of divisions in both regions, regardless of whether religious, ethnic or nationalist reasons are in question". In April 2012 a Syrian opposition delegation (Syrian National Council) led by Ammar Abdulhamid visited Pristina and promised to recognise Kosovo immediately if they triumph in Syria.

== Post-Assad relations ==
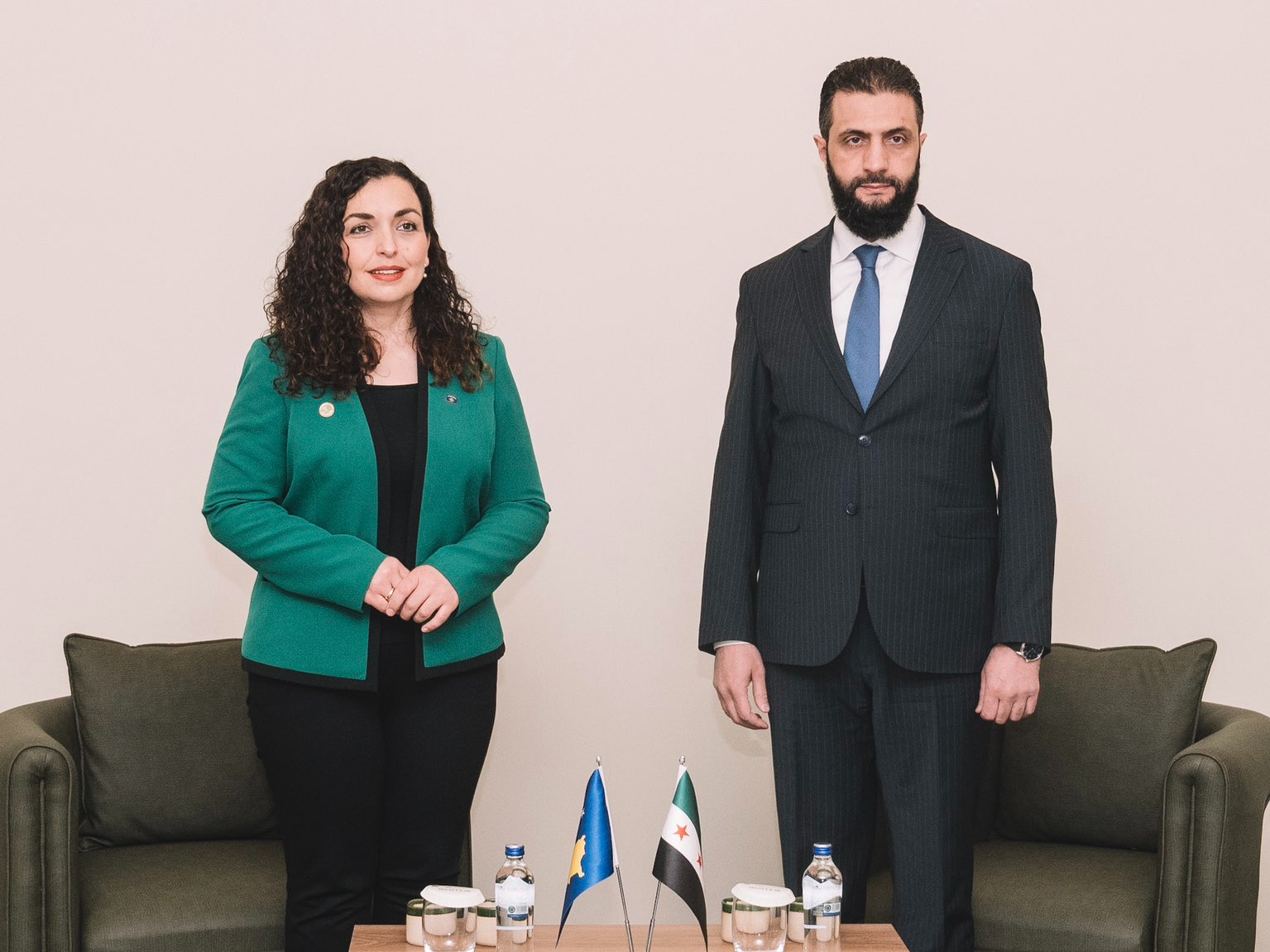
Kosovan president Vjosa Osmani with Syrian president Ahmed al-Sharaa, 11 April 2025

Following the Fall of the Assad regime, new Syrian president Ahmed al-Sharaa met Kosovo's president Vjosa Osmani at the Antalya Diplomacy Forum on 11 April 2025. The flags of both countries were present and the official Syrian readout stated that al-Shaara met with the president of the "Republic of Kosovo" implying acknowledgement of the Republic of Kosovo as a state.

On 29 October 2025, Syria officially recognized the Republic of Kosovo as an independent and sovereign state.

== See also ==
- Foreign relations of Kosovo
- Foreign relations of Syria
- Serbia–Syria relations
