= Qatari involvement in the Syrian civil war =

The Qatari involvement in the Syrian civil war began in April 2012, with deliveries of arms to rebels in Syria from Qatar and as of 2024, it has continued to support the National Coalition of Syrian Revolutionary and Opposition Forces.

== Support for rebels ==
In 2013, the Financial Times reported that Qatar had funded the Syrian rebellion by at least $1 billion and "as much as $3 billion" over the first two years of the civil war. It reported that Qatar was offering refugee packages of about $50,000 a year to defectors and family.

In 2013, the Stockholm International Peace Research Institute estimated that Qatar had fueled the war by delivering more weapons to Syria than any other country. In total, there were over 15 weapons cargo flights into Turkey between April 2012 and March 2013.

In 2014, Qatar operated a training base for rebels in its territory, in conjunction with U.S. military forces who ran the training, training about 1,200 rebels a year in three week courses.

Gareth Porter wrote in 2015 that Qatar has provided support to rebel groups across the spectrum, not only funding more moderate rebels but also a coalition known as the Army of Conquest, which initially contained al-Qaeda linked groups.

== See also ==
- Qatar–Syria relations
- Foreign relations of Syria
- Foreign relations of Qatar
