= Somalia–Syria relations =

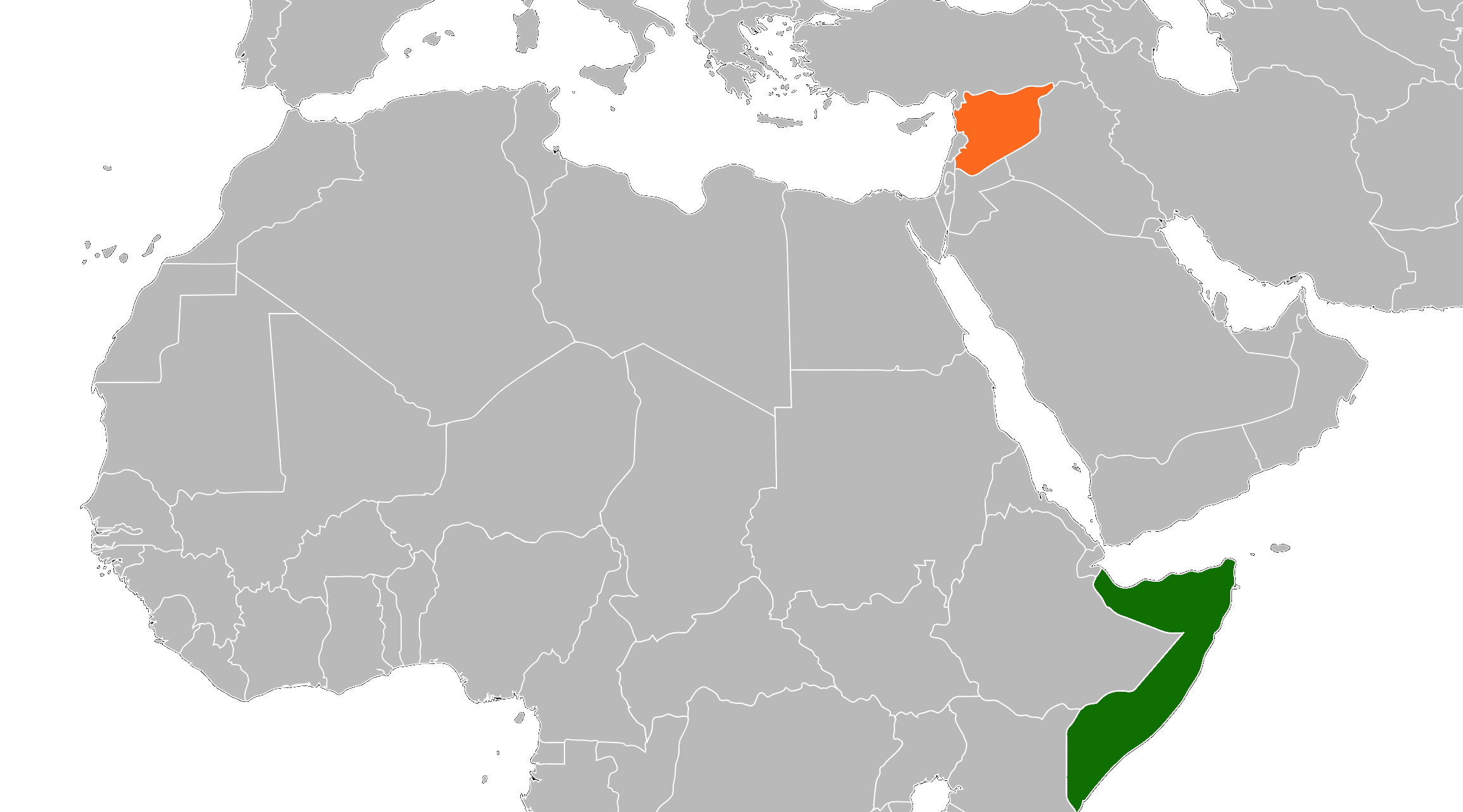
- Somalia: Syria

Somalia–Syria relations refer to foreign relations between Somalia and Syria. Diplomatic relations were established when Syria opened its embassy in Mogadishu on 13 December 1964. Both nations are members of the Arab League and United Nations.

== History ==
Diplomatic relations between Syria and Somalia were established on 13 December 1964. Historically and presently, the relationship between the two countries is characterized by mutual amicability.

Somalia strongly opposed Israel's attack on Egypt and Syria in the Six-Day War in 1967 and their occupation of the Golan and is of the opinion that the Golan is sovereign Syrian territory. Conversely, Syria strongly supports the territorial integrity of Somalia and rejects the legitimacy of Somaliland, considering it to be Somali territory.

Somalia also supported the Arab coalition in the Yom Kippur War in which Syria was the main belligerent on the Golan front.

In turn, Syria supported Somalia in the Ogaden War, sending a small expeditionary infantry force to assist Somalia's war effort, even receiving President Siad Barre on a state visit to Damascus in 1977, despite Syria's exceptionally close relationship with the Soviet Union. During the latter half of the Cold War, President Hafez al-Assad viewed Somalia with some caution as Somalia had a very close relationship with Iraq, as Hafez and Iraq's President Saddam Hussein were vying for influence regionally and within the Ba'ath Party and both leaders despised each other.

When the Somali Democratic Republic collapsed in 1991, Syria closed its embassy in Mogadishu, and received many Somali refugees and extended privileges such as state-subsided healthcare to the refugees.

Notably, Somalia did not fully cut relations with Syria as a result of the civil war in Syria unlike many other Arab or Muslim countries, merely temporarily vacating their embassy. In fact, relations are still warm between Somalia and Syria on account of Syria's past stances of Somalia, particularly Syria's support of Somalia in the Ogaden War and the government's positive reception of Somali refugees. Somalia's embassy on occasion sends diplomatic dispatches to affirm Somalia's support for Syria.

There are Syrian refugees in Somalia who are well received as they are perceived to be high skilled labourers and Somalia benefits from the additional labour force.

== Diplomatic missions ==
Somalia has an embassy in Damascus, and Syria maintains a non-resident embassy in Sanaa.

== See also ==
- Foreign relations of Somalia
- Foreign relations of Syria
