= Romania–Syria relations =

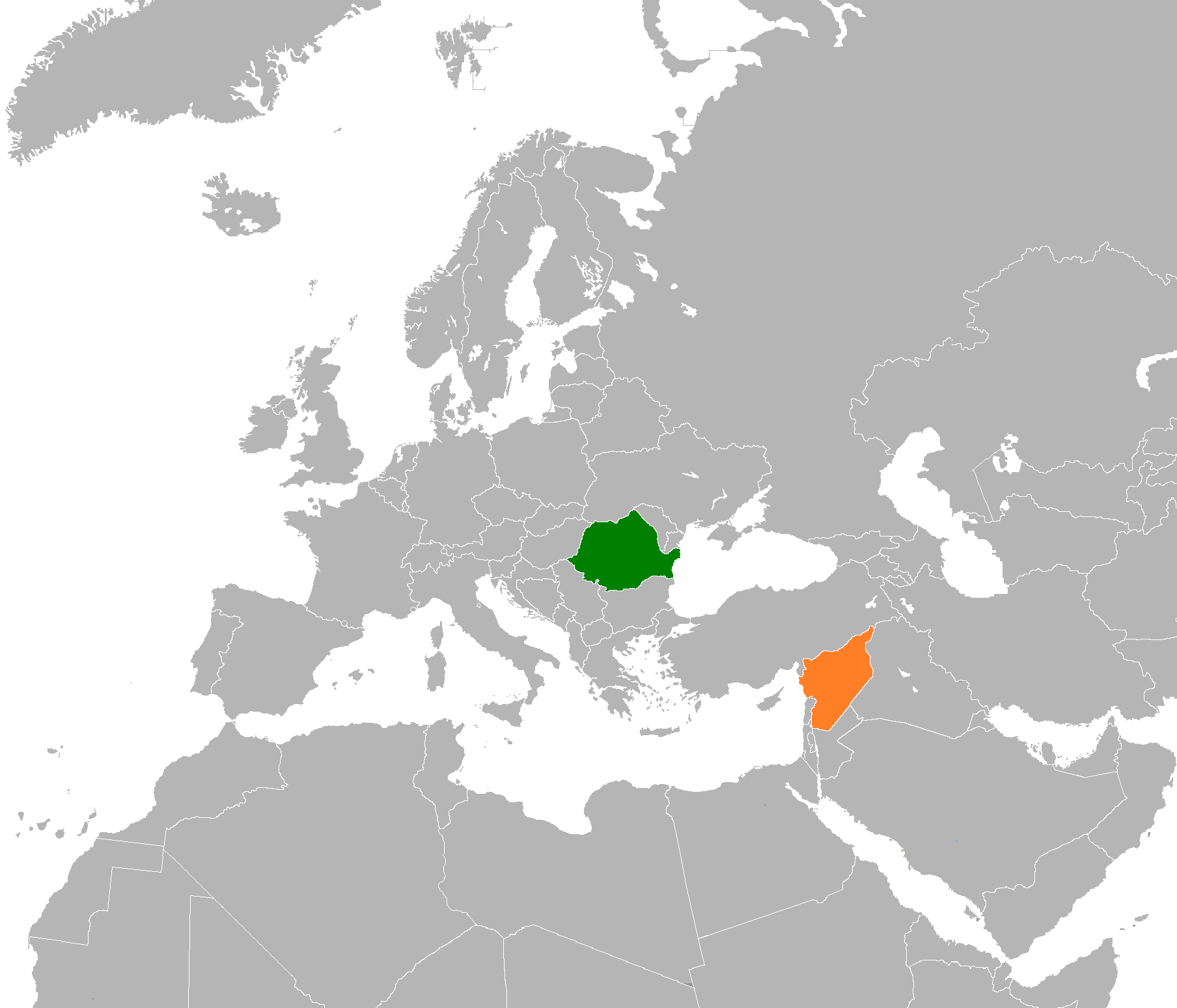
- Romania: Syria

Romania–Syria relations refer to the bilateral and diplomatic relations between Romania and Syria. Relations between the Romanian People's Republic and the Syrian Republic were established on 9 August 1955. Romania has an embassy in Damascus. Syria has an embassy in Bucharest.

Before Syria suspended itself, both countries were full members of the UM. In September 2021, a chargé d'affaires was appointed at the Romanian embassy in Damascus. In April 2024, a Romanian Intelligence Service chief Răzvan Ionescu met with Syrian President Bashar al-Assad and Hossam Louka, director of GID, delivering a joint message from Romania, Cyprus, Greece and Italy, expressing their intention to re-establish contact with the Syrian government.

== Factors affecting relations ==
- The two countries were exposed to colonialism and occupation, which made their positions against the occupation.
- Geographical proximity and the common cultural heritage between the two countries represented by Ancient Syria and Dacia through Greco-Roman world.
- Both countries belonged to Roman Empire and Ottoman Empire for centuries.

== See also ==
- Foreign relations of Romania
- Foreign relations of Syria
