= Syria–Tunisia relations =

Bilateral relations

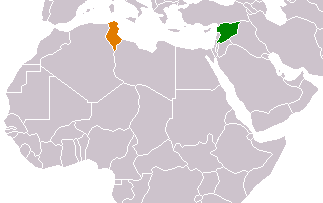
- Syria: Tunisia

Syria–Tunisia relations refers to the bilateral relations between the Republic of Tunisia and Syria. Tunisia has an embassy in Damascus. Syria has an embassy in Tunis. Both countries are members of the Arab League and of the Union for the Mediterranean, although Syria was suspended in 2011. They are bound by cultural and historical ties and have enjoyed a very cordial relationship. Both countries established diplomatic relations on 2 June 1956.

== History of relations ==
=== Revolutions and war (2010–2018) ===
The 11th session of the Tunisian-Syrian High Joint Committee met in Tunis in May 2010. The two countries share experience and information on such issues as housing, shipping, and tourism. On 12 July 2010, Tunisian President Zine El Abidine Ben Ali held a talks with Syrian President Bashar al-Assad in Carthage Palace, Tunis.

The Tunisian Revolution that began on 17 December 2010, resulted in longtime President of Tunisia Zine El Abidine Ben Ali being overthrown when the Islamists represented by the Ennahda Movement took the reins of power in Carthage. This has resulted in general instability in the region and the rise of multiple terrorist groups who have led attacks against both countries.

Rashid al-Ghannushi, president of Ennahda Movement, Tunisia's largest party stated on 2 November 2011 that SNC is the legitimate representative of Syria, at the same time he closed Syrian embassy in Tunis and ousted Syrian ambassador. On 16 December 2011, SNC hold three-day congress (its first international congress) in Tunis where Tunisia's newly elected president, Moncef Marzouki, participated in the talks and had a press conference with SNC's president Burhan Ghalioun.

In February 2012, new Tunisian President Moncef Marzouki announced the severance of diplomatic relations with Syria due to “increased civilian deaths at the hands of government forces”, according to a statement issued by the Tunisian Presidency.

In July 2015, after Beji Caid Essebsi assumed the presidency of Tunisia, the Ministry of Foreign Affairs appointed a consul-general in Damascus. Tunisia's Foreign Minister Taïeb Baccouche also described cutting diplomatic relation with Syria as a "wrong procedure". The Government of Tunisia was keen on its interest in tracking the 3,000 Tunisians who travelled to Syria and Iraq to join ISIS. This move enabled the Tunisian leadership opening information channel to share informations with Damascus.

In 2016, the former Foreign Minister Khemaies Jhinaoui also indicated that “the level of diplomatic relations with Syria is not at the ambassadorial level, but rather at the consular level.

=== Reaprochement (2018–present) ===
In late 2018, Egypt, Tunisia and Morocco began lobbying for Syria's return to the League. In 2019, France24 speculated that new president Kais Saied could renew his country's diplomatic relations with Syria.

Following the 2023 Turkey–Syria earthquake, President Saied decided to strengthen diplomatic ties with Syria. In April 2023, after the visit of foreign minister Faisal Mekdad in Tunis, Syria officially re-established diplomatic relations with Tunisia. It came as influential Tunisian Islamist Ennahdha party leader Rached Ghannouchi was detained after a police search. On 19 May 2023, President Bashar al-Assad met Tunisian President Kais Saied on the sidelines of the Arab League Summit in Jeddah, Saudi Arabia. The two presidents discussed bilateral relations between the two brotherly countries and bilateral cooperation in various fields.

In May 2023, the Tunisian embassy in Damascus was reopened with new ambassador, Abdul Hadi Muhammad Al-Mahdhabi. On 2 October 2023, Muhammed Muhammed was sworn in as the new Syrian Ambassador in Tunis. On 11 January 2024, Ambassador Muhammed Muhammed presented his credentials to Tunisian President Kais Saied as Ambassador Extraordinary and Plenipotentiary of the Syrian Arab Republic to the Republic of Tunisia.

== Partner cities ==
The following is a list of twinning agreements between the cities of Tunisia and Syria:

- Sousse has been linked with Latakia by a twinning agreement since 1980.

== See also ==
- Foreign relations of Syria
- Foreign relations of Tunisia
- List of diplomatic missions in Syria
- List of diplomatic missions in Tunisia
