= Oman–Syria relations =

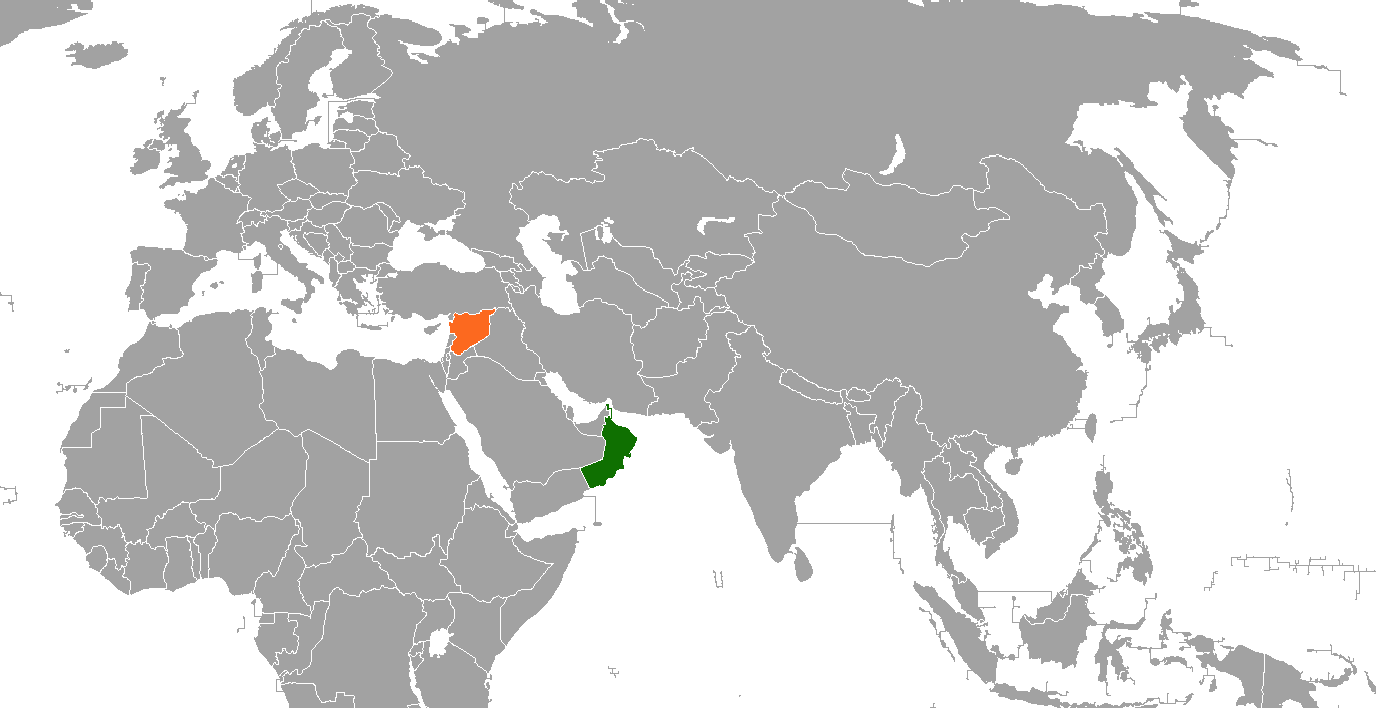

- Oman: Syria

Diplomatic mission
- Embassy of Syria in Muscat: Embassy of Oman in Damascus

Envoy
- Ambassador Turki bin Mahmood al-Busaidy: Ambassador Idris Mayya

Oman–Syria relations refer to the relationship between the Sultanate of Oman and Syria. Oman has an embassy in Damascus; while Syria has an embassy in Muscat. Both are members of the Arab League, and despite the ongoing civil war occurring in Syria, Oman has not closed its embassy in Syria and both countries maintain diplomatic relations, in sharp contrast to other Arab states of the Persian Gulf who have cut off diplomatic ties with Syria and closed their embassies.

== History of relations ==
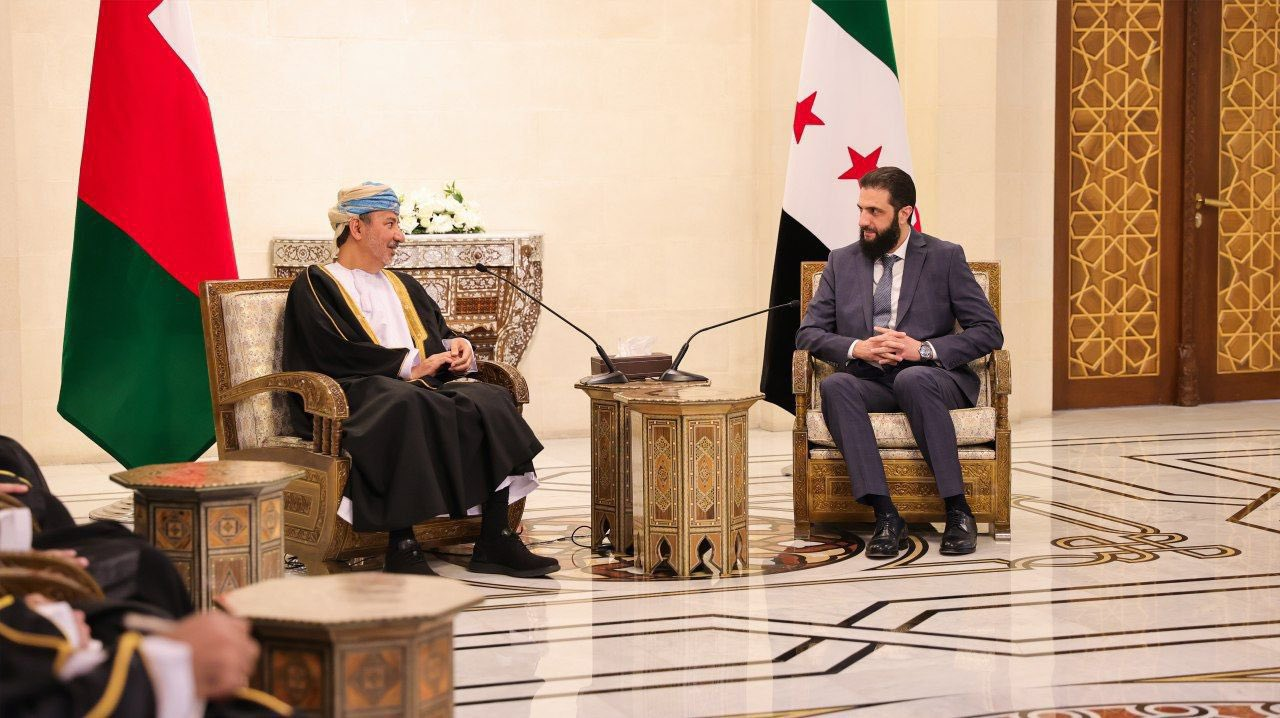
Sheikh Abdulaziz bin Abdullah Alhinai, Ambassador at large of the Foreign Ministry and Ahmad Al Shara

Following the outbreak of the Syrian civil war, Gulf states including Saudi Arabia, Qatar and Bahrain were quick to declare their support for the Syrian opposition against Syrian president Bashar al-Assad, setting out to isolate the Syrian government by cutting off diplomatic ties, closing down their embassies, expelling Syria from the Arab League and imposing heavy economic sanctions. A notable exception in the policies of the Gulf states was Oman, who not only refused to close down their embassies and cut off diplomatic ties, but also refused to support the Syrian opposition, with Omani Foreign Minister Yusuf bin Alawi bin Abdullah stating that Oman's role in the conflict would strictly be constrained to humanitarian assistance in sharp contrast with Saudi Arabia and Qatar.

In August 2015, Oman invited Syrian delegation headed by Foreign Minister Walid Muallem to Muscat to meet with his Omani counterpart, Yusuf bin Alawi bin Abdullah. In October of that same year, the Omani Foreign Minister traveled to Damascus, meeting with Assad himself to discuss Syria's ongoing civil war and defeating terrorism while assuring Oman's commitment to Syrian unity and sovereignty, with foreign minister Alawi saying that Oman "continues to exert every possible effort to help find a solution that would end the crisis in Syria".

Oman's foreign minister, Yusuf bin Alawi bin Abdullah met with Assad and foreign minister Walid Muallem on 7 July 2019. Following the closed-door meeting, the Omani foreign ministry reported that Alawi had delivered a greeting from the Sultan of Oman to the Syrian President and talked about boosting efforts to "restore stability and security in the region”, as well as strengthening the Omani-Syrian relations.

On 5 October 2020, Oman became the first Persian Gulf country to reinstate its ambassador in Syria. In July 2022, a joint Syria-Oman business council was established with the aim of wider economic cooperation.

In 2023, President Bashar al-Assad travelled to Oman for his first foreign visit since 2011. President al-Assad also met Sultan Haitham bin Tariq, bilateral relations and cooperation were discussed.

On 11 January 2025, Shaikh Abdulaziz bin Abdullah al Hinai, ambassador-at-large at the Foreign Ministry, held a meeting in Damascus with Ahmed al-Sharaa, the de facto ruler of Syria, following the fall of the Assad regime.

== Economic ties ==
By 2021, Oman's share of Syrian exports was 0.72%, making it Syria's reliable export partner. In 2021, Oman was one of the smaller import partners of Syria with a share of almost 0.2%.

== See also ==
- Foreign relations of Oman
- Foreign relations of Syria
