= Hungary–Syria relations =

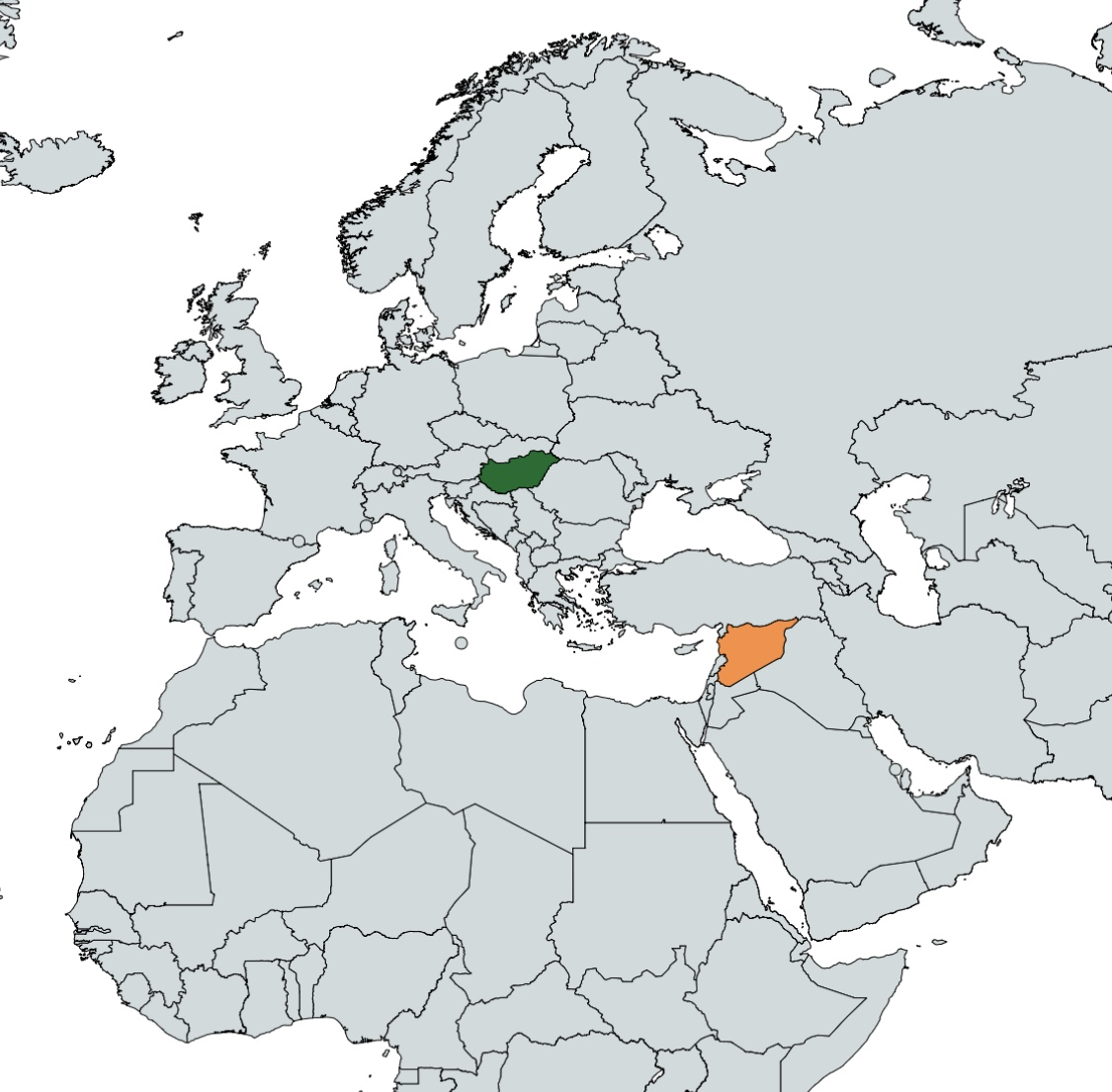

- Hungary: Syria

Hungary–Syria relations refers to the bilateral relations between Hungary and Syria. Both countries established diplomatic relations in 1954. In 1961, the Syrian embassy in Budapest was opened. As both countries were members of the Eastern Bloc during the Cold War, the communist administration of Hungary had improved ties with Ba'athist Syria, with Hafez al-Assad visited in 1978 meeting with János Kádár.

When communism collapsed in Hungary in 1989 and reoriented towards the West, relations between Hungary and Syria were maintained. However, following the Syrian revolution, these relations were partially severed in 2012, when Hungary joined most EU countries in imposing sanctions on Syria and withdrawing its ambassador from Damascus.

In 2019, Hungary, now led by Viktor Orbán, announced its intention to upgrade its diplomatic representation in Syria. Hungary's move was motivated by its populist approach and its desire to participate in Syria's reconstruction. In 2020, a chargé d'affaires and a consul have been appointed at the reopened Hungarian embassy in Damascus. In 2022, the Syrian Foreign Minister Faisal Mekdad and his Hungarian counterpart Péter Szijjártó held a talks on improving bilateral relations. After the seismic event of February 2023, Hungary gave Syria 50 million HUF in assistance. Hungary and Syria maintained these relations following the fall of the Assad regime in 2024 and EU lifted all sanctions against Syria.

== See also ==
- Foreign relations of Syria
- Foreign relations of Hungary
