= Foreign relations of Syria =

Since the Syrian Republic gained independence from the French Mandate, Syria has seen tension with its neighbours, such as Turkey, Israel, Jordan, Iraq, and Lebanon. Ensuring national security, increasing influence among its Arab neighbours and securing the return of the Golan Heights, had been the primary goals of Ba'athist Syria's foreign policy. Syria is also a full member of the Arab League. Syria enjoyed an improvement in relations with several of the states in its region in the 21st century, prior to the Arab Spring and the Syrian civil war. Due to the Syrian civil war, Ba'athist Syrian government was partially isolated from the countries in the region and the wider international community until 2022. After the fall of the Assad regime in late 2024, the new Syrian government actively engaged with the European Union and neighboring countries including Turkey and the Arab world for post-war reconstruction.

== History ==
=== Ba'athist Syria ===
Under the Ba'athist regime, diplomatic relations were severed with several countries, including Turkey, Canada, France, Australia, New Zealand, Sweden, Denmark, the Netherlands, Germany, the United States, the United Kingdom, Belgium, Spain, Mexico, Qatar, Georgia, and Ukraine. In 2011 and 2012, Syria was suspended from the Organisation of Islamic Cooperation, Union for the Mediterranean and the Arab League.

Ba'athist Syria had close ties with its traditional allies, Iran and Russia. Other countries that maintain good relations with the Assad regime include China, North Korea, Vietnam, Fiji, Singapore, Sri Lanka, Laos, Myanmar, Cambodia, Thailand, Philippines, India, Pakistan, Bangladesh, Malaysia, Indonesia Brunei, Armenia, Azerbaijan, Kazakhstan, Kyrgyzstan, Uzbekistan, Turkmenistan, Mongolia, Tajikistan, Greece, Cyprus, North Macedonia, Czech Republic, Romania, Bulgaria, Hungary, Serbia, Montenegro, Vatican City and Belarus. Syria was a candidate state of the Eurasian Economic Union (EAEU).

Syria maintains relations with autonomous Iraqi Kurdistan. Syria has not recognized Israel since the 1948 Arab–Israeli War. Ba'athist Syria also did not have diplomatic relations with South Korea, but the Assad regime had diplomatic relations with Abkhazia and South Ossetia (two Russian-occupied territories in Georgia).

On 26 February 2023, Bashar al-Assad met with Iraqi, Jordanian, Palestinian, Libyan, Egyptian and Emirati lawmakers, as well as representatives from Oman and Lebanon after more than a decade of isolation in the region. Arab states contributed significantly to the relief effort after the 2023 Turkey–Syria earthquake. A week before, Al-Assad travelled to Oman for his first foreign visit since the quake. Syrian–Turkish normalization was also underway since 2022. On 7 May 2023, following these rapprochements, Syria was readmitted to the Arab League. While the earthquake facilitated these rapprochements, the main reasons for the readmission were the Syrian refugees in neighboring countries and the Captagon trafficking, two issues that needed Syria's involvement for being solved.

=== Post Ba'athist era ===
Since the fall of the Assad regime in 2024, it is unclear whether the new transitional government retained all of Ba'athist Syria's diplomatic relations. However, Turkey became the first country to re-establish diplomatic relations with post-Assad Syria, doing so on 14 December 2024. In December 2024, Qatar also re-established diplomatic relations with Syria.

In April 2025, Saudi Arabia increased its engagement with Syria by planning to pay off Syria's $15 million debt to the World Bank, potentially allowing Syria to receive grants for reconstruction efforts under its new government led by Ahmed al-Sharaa, who seized power in December 2024. The international community is cautiously observing al-Sharaa's government, particularly regarding its commitment to protecting religious minorities, though this move by Saudi Arabia signals a new level of diplomatic and economic engagement with the Syrian government after years of strained relations. In addition, other Gulf Arab states have announced plans to support Syria as well.

== Diplomatic relations ==
List of countries which Syria maintains diplomatic relations with:

#	Country	Date
1	United Kingdom	9 February 1942
2	Saudi Arabia	26 June 1944
3	Russia	21 July 1944
4	United States	17 November 1944
5	Egypt	1944
6	Poland	18 September 1945
7	Chile	22 October 1945
8	Iraq	8 November 1945
9	Brazil	13 November 1945
10	Argentina	23 November 1945
11	Serbia	26 February 1946
12	Turkey	8 March 1946
13	Belgium	20 March 1946
14	Netherlands	1 May 1946
15	Switzerland	7 May 1946
16	Venezuela	14 June 1946
17	France	18 June 1946
18	Philippines	4 September 1946
19	Czech Republic	20 September 1946
20	Uruguay	11 October 1946
21	Iran	12 November 1946
22	Greece	24 June 1947
23	Sweden	24 June 1947
24	Italy	27 September 1947
25	Spain	3 April 1948
26	Afghanistan	2 August 1948
27	Norway	11 August 1948
28	Jordan	1948
29	Ethiopia	31 July 1949
30	Pakistan	December 1949
31	Indonesia	27 February 1950
32	India	6 June 1950
33	Mexico	20 August 1950
34	Austria	7 February 1952
35	Germany	14 October 1952
—	Holy See	21 February 1953
36	Finland	22 May 1953
37	Luxembourg	24 July 1953
38	Denmark	10 December 1953
39	Japan	December 1953
40	Hungary	13 May 1954
41	Bulgaria	24 August 1954
42	Romania	9 August 1955
43	Thailand	10 January 1956
44	Morocco	2 June 1956
45	Tunisia	2 June 1956
46	China	1 August 1956
47	Sudan	28 January 1957
48	Malaysia	1958
49	Cyprus	25 October 1960
50	Algeria	27 August 1962
51	Kuwait	24 October 1963
52	Libya	1963
53	Benin	29 November 1964
54	Cameroon	29 November 1964
55	Guinea	29 November 1964
56	Mali	29 November 1964
57	Sierra Leone	29 November 1964
58	Somalia	13 December 1964
59	Costa Rica	15 December 1964
60	Senegal	21 January 1965
61	Canada	20 May 1965
62	Yemen	23 May 1965
63	Cuba	11 August 1965
64	Nigeria	30 September 1965
65	Mauritania	11 June 1966
66	Vietnam	21 July 1966
67	North Korea	25 July 1966
68	Niger	13 September 1966
69	Tanzania	13 September 1966
70	Mongolia	31 July 1967
71	Sri Lanka	10 May 1969
72	Zambia	15 May 1969
73	Albania	27 May 1969
74	Chad	16 August 1969
75	Nepal	26 February 1970
76	Mauritius	22 May 1970
77	Malta	1970
78	Rwanda	10 February 1971
79	Trinidad and Tobago	11 January 1972
80	Qatar	19 January 1972
81	United Arab Emirates	19 January 1972
82	Burundi	April 1972
83	Myanmar	15 June 1972
84	Uganda	28 June 1972
85	Guyana	19 June 1973
86	Bangladesh	14 September 1973
87	Bahrain	23 January 1975
88	Portugal	19 February 1975
89	Australia	12 May 1975
90	Gabon	18 July 1975
91	Ireland	18 July 1975
92	Mozambique	5 August 1975
93	Peru	16 August 1975
94	Comoros	25 November 1975
95	Panama	17 February 1976
96	Suriname	19 May 1976
97	Republic of the Congo	10 February 1977
98	Djibouti	June 1977
99	Grenada	23 January 1980
100	Maldives	1981
101	Antigua and Barbuda	18 April 1983
102	Oman	19 December 1987
103	Colombia	24 May 1988
—	State of Palestine	22 January 1992
104	Armenia	6 March 1992
105	Uzbekistan	24 March 1992
106	Turkmenistan	26 March 1992
107	Kazakhstan	27 March 1992
108	Azerbaijan	28 March 1992
109	Tajikistan	29 March 1992
110	Ukraine	31 March 1992
111	Slovakia	1 January 1993
—	Georgia (suspended)	18 May 1993
112	Estonia	19 May 1993
113	Moldova	20 May 1993
114	Latvia	25 May 1993
115	Lithuania	25 May 1993
116	Kyrgyzstan	28 May 1993
117	Belarus	26 August 1993
118	Eritrea	22 April 1994
119	South Africa	1 June 1994
120	Bosnia and Herzegovina	1 December 1994
121	Slovenia	25 August 1997
122	Croatia	29 August 1997
123	Ecuador	7 December 1997
124	Angola	10 February 1999
125	Nicaragua	14 February 1999
126	Belize	28 August 2001
127	Brunei	31 August 2002
128	Iceland	6 May 2004
129	Paraguay	13 December 2004
130	Laos	22 December 2004
131	New Zealand	5 December 2006
132	Kenya	23 April 2007
133	Dominican Republic	28 September 2007
134	Singapore	28 May 2008
135	Lebanon	15 October 2008
136	Montenegro	30 October 2008
137	North Macedonia	23 September 2010
138	Cambodia	15 October 2010
139	Fiji	23 December 2010
—	Abkhazia	29 May 2018
—	South Ossetia	22 July 2018
—	Dominica (suspended)	7 March 2022
140	Bolivia	4 September 2023
141	South Korea	10 April 2025

== Bilateral relations ==
=== Africa ===
Country	Formal Relations Began	Notes
Algeria	27 August 1962	See Algeria–Syria relations: Both countries established diplomatic relations on 27 August 1962.; Syria has an embassy in Algiers.; Algeria has an embassy in Damascus.; Both countries are members of Arab League.
Angola	10 February 1999	Both countries established diplomatic relations on 10 February 1999.; In 2021, Faisal Mekdad, Foreign and Expatriates Minister, met with Minister of Foreign Affairs of Angola, Tete António, within the framework of the High-Level Meeting to Commemorate the 60th Anniversary of the First Conference of the Non-Aligned Movement.
Benin	29 November 1964	Both countries established diplomatic relations on 29 November 1964.; Syria has an honorary consulate in Cotonou.
Cameroon	29 November 1964	Both countries established diplomatic relations on 29 November 1964.; In 2017, President Bashar al-Assad received on Thursday a cable of congratulation from President of Cameroon Paul Biya on occasion of Syria's Independence Day.
Egypt	1944	See Egypt–Syria relations: Both countries established diplomatic relations in 1944 when Rafik Asha was accredited as Chargé d'Affaires of Syrian Legation (Embassy) in Cairo.; Syria has an embassy in Cairo.; Egypt has an embassy in Damascus.; In June 2013 Egypt's president Mohammed Morsi announced he would cut all relations with the Syrian government. Under Abdel Fattah el-Sisi, however, Egypt has taken a more supportive stance towards Syria's government. In 2017, for example, Egypt called for Syria's re-admittance to the Arab League.; Both countries are members of Arab League.
Libya	1963	See Libya–Syria relations: Both countries established diplomatic relations in 1963.; Syria has an embassy in Tripoli, which was reopened on 20 August 2025.; Libya has an embassy in Damascus.; President Bashar al-Assad, Syrian head of state, responded to the Syrian civil war in a manner frequently compared by protesters to Muammar Gaddafi's crackdown in February 2011 and beyond.; Syria voted at the United Nations General Assembly to accredit the NTC as representative of Libya on 16 September 2011.; On 10 October 2011, Libya became the first country to recognise the Syrian National Council as "the sole legitimate government in Syria".; NTC also ordered the Syrian Embassy in Tripoli to be shuttered until further notice. They also promised the representatives of SNC to hand them over the embassy of Syria in Tripoli.; On 1 March 2020, a Libyan diplomatic delegation, representing the Libyan House of Representatives, visited Damascus to sign a memorandum of understanding (MoU) regarding reactivating the diplomatic missions between the two countries.; Both countries are members of Arab League.
Mauritania	11 June 1966	Both countries established diplomatic relations on 11 June 1966.; Syria has an embassy in Nouakchott.; Mauritania has an embassy in Damascus.; Both countries are members of Arab League.
Morocco	2 June 1956	See Morocco–Syria relations: Both countries established diplomatic relations on 2 June 1956.; Syria has an embassy in Rabat, which was reopened on 14 May 2026.; Morocco has an embassy in Damascus.; Both countries are members of Arab League.
Mozambique	5 August 1975	Both countries established diplomatic relations on 5 August 1975.; In 2018, a meeting took place between José Condungua Pacheco and Walid Muallem.
Nigeria	30 September 1965	Both countries established diplomatic relations on 30 September 1965.; Syria has an embassy in Abuja and honorary consulates in Lagos and Kano.; Nigeria has an embassy in Damascus.; In 2022, Nigeria called for lifting all sanctions imposed on Syria.
SADR	15 April 1980 (recognition)	See See Western Sahara–Syria relations: Syria officially recognized SADR on 15 April 1980, but does not maintain diplomatic relations with it.; SADR has General Delegation in Damascus.
Senegal	21 January 1965	Both countries established diplomatic relations on 21 January 1965.; Syria has an embassy in Dakar.; Senegal is accredited to Syria from its embassy in Cairo.
Somalia	13 December 1964	See Somalia–Syria relations: Both countries established diplomatic relations on 13 December 1964.; President Hafez al-Assad and President Siad Barre had a positive relationship despite Somalia's very strong economic and military ties to Syria's then-geopolitical rival, Iraq. Syria also provided limited intelligence and logistics support to Somalia during the Ogaden War despite the Soviet-Syrian special relationship.; Syria has a non-resident embassy in Sanaa.; Syria formerly had an embassy in Mogadishu but vacated it in 1991 due to the outbreak of the Somali Civil War.; Somalia has an embassy in Damascus.; Both countries are members of Arab League.
South Africa	1 June 1994	Both countries established diplomatic relations on 1 June 1994.; Syria has an embassy in Pretoria.; South Africa has an embassy in Damascus.; Both countries share close political and economic relations.
Sudan	28 January 1957	See Sudan–Syria relations: Both countries established diplomatic relations on 28 January 1957, when Ambassador of Syria to Sudan (resident in Cairo) Mr. Abdel Rahman El Azm was accredited.; Syria has an embassy in Khartoum.; Sudan has an embassy in Damascus.; On 16 December 2018, Sudanese President, Omar al-Bashir, became the first Arab League member to visit Syria since the eruption of Syrian civil war in 2011.; Both countries are members of Arab League.
Tanzania	13 September 1966	Both countries established diplomatic relations on 13 September 1966.; Syria has an embassy in Dar-es-Salaam.; Tanzania is accredited to Syria from its embassy in Cairo.; In 2013, Tanzania supported Syrian government in the civil war.
Tunisia	2 June 1956	See Syria–Tunisia relations: Both countries established diplomatic relations on 2 June 1956.; Syria has an embassy in Tunis.; Tunisia has an embassy in Damascus.; Tunisia ceased to recognise the government of Syria on 4 February 2012. During his tenure, Hamadi Jebali, the Prime Minister, called on fellow Arab states to follow its lead: "We have to expel the Syrian ambassadors from Arab countries."; In 2019, France24 speculated that new president Kais Saied could renew his country's diplomatic relations with Syria.; Following the 2023 Turkey–Syria earthquake, President Saied decided to strengthen diplomatic ties with Syria to the ambassador level.; In April 2023, Syria officially re-established diplomatic relations with Tunisia.; Both countries are members of Arab League.
Uganda	28 June 1972	Both countries established diplomatic relations on 28 June 1972.; Syria has an honorary consulate in Kampala.
Zimbabwe		Syria is accredited to Zimbabwe from its embassy in Pretoria.; On 1 June 2014, chairperson of the Parliamentary Portfolio Committee on Foreign Affairs Cde Enock Porusingazi said that Zimbabwe stood in solidarity with Syria and its people, supporting their government.

=== Americas ===
Syria has diplomatic relations with most Central and South American countries such as Antigua and Barbuda, Argentina, Bolivia, Brazil, Chile, Cuba, Ecuador, El Salvador, Grenada, Guatemala, Guyana, Nicaragua, Panama, Paraguay, Peru, Saint Lucia, Suriname, Uruguay and Venezuela.

Country	Formal Relations Began	Notes
Antigua and Barbuda	18 April 1983	Both countries established diplomatic relations on 18 April 1983.; Syria has an honorary consulate in St. John's.; In 2021, Antigua along with other ALBA members, expressed support for Syria in the war.
Argentina	23 November 1945	See Argentina–Syria relations: Both countries established diplomatic relations on 23 November 1945.; Argentina has an embassy in Damascus.; Syria has an embassy in Buenos Aires.; In 2010, President Bashar al-Assad visited Argentina and met then President Cristina Fernandez de Kirchner in Buenos Aires.
Belize	28 August 2001	Both countries established diplomatic relations on 28 August 2001.; Syria is accredited to Belize from its embassy in Havana.
Bolivia	4 September 2023	Both countries established diplomatic relations on 4 September 2023.; Syria is accredited to Bolivia from its embassy in Santiago.; In 2019, Dr. Bouthaina Shaaban, the presidential advisor, held a meeting with Bolivian Minister of Foreign Affairs Diego Pary Rodríguez. The two sides stressed the importance of friendly relations between Syria and Bolivia and mutual cooperation.
Brazil	13 November 1945	See Brazil–Syria relations: Both countries established diplomatic relations on 13 November 1945.; Brazil has an embassy in Damascus.; Syria has an embassy in Brasília.; In 2010, President Bashar al-Assad visited Brazil and held meeting with Lula da Silva on closer political and economic ties.
Canada	20 May 1965	See Canada–Syria relations: Both countries established diplomatic relations on 20 May 1965.; The Canadian Embassy closed on 5 March 2012.; The Syrian Embassy in Ottawa was closed on 29 May 2012.; Syrian consulate in Montreal was closed in 2016. Syria has an honorary consulate in Vancouver.; Since the beginning of the Syrian War, over 40,000 Syrian refugees have re-settled in Canada.; Canada has announced plans to ease sanctions against Syria and names its ambassador to Lebanon to serve in a parallel role in Syria on 13 March 2025.
Chile	22 October 1945	See Chile–Syria relations: Both countries established diplomatic relations on 22 October 1945.; Syria has an embassy in Santiago.; Chile has an embassy in Damascus.
Colombia	24 May 1988	Both countries established diplomatic relations on 24 May 1988.; Syria is accredited to Colombia from its embassy in Caracas.; Colombia is accredited to Syria from its embassy in Beirut.; Colombian Foreign Ministry about relations with Syria; See Syrian Colombians.
Cuba	11 August 1965	See Cuba–Syria relations: Syria has an embassy in Havana.; Cuba has an embassy in Damascus.; Both countries have close political, economic and military relations.; In 2010, President Bashar al-Assad met with Cuban leader Raul Castro as part of his visit in Cuba.
Dominican Republic	2 October 2007	Both countries established diplomatic relations on 2 October 2007.; Syria is accredited to Dominican Republic from its embassy in Caracas.
Grenada	23 January 1980	Both countries established diplomatic relations on 23 January 1980.; In 2023, Prime Minister of Grenada, Dickon Mitchell expressed deep sympathy and solidarity with Government of Syria regarding 2023 Turkey–Syria earthquakes.
Guyana	19 June 1973	Both countries established diplomatic relations on 19 June 1973.; In 2014, President Bashar al-Assad received several cables from President Donald Ramotar of Guyana congratulating him on his win in the 2014 Syrian presidential election.
Mexico	20 August 1950	See Mexico–Syria relations: Mexico and Syria established diplomatic relations on 21 August 1950.; Syria does not have an embassy accredited to Mexico.; Mexico is accredited to Syria from its embassy in Cairo.; In 2014, Mexico closed its honorary consulate in Damascus.
Nicaragua	14 February 1999	See Nicaragua–Syria relations: Both countries established diplomatic relations on 14 February 1999.; Syria is accredited to Nicaragua from its embassy in Havana.; Nicaragua is accredited to Syria from its embassy in Tehran.; Both nations share close political relations.
Panama	17 February 1976	Both countries established diplomatic relations on 17 February 1976.; Syria has an honorary consulates in Panama City and Colón.
Paraguay	13 December 2004	Both countries established diplomatic relations on 13 December 2004.; Syria is accredited to Paraguay from its embassy in Buenos Aires.; Syria has an honorary consulate in Ciudad del Este.; Paraguay has an honorary consulate in Damascus since July 2022.; In July 2022, the President of the Senate of Paraguay, Óscar Rubén Salomón, made an official state visit to Syria, which Syrian state media said had the aim of establishing political, economic, commercial, parliamentary and other relations.; The delegation was received by the highest constitutional officials of Syria, including Bashar al Assad, Hussein Arnous and Hammouda Sabbagh.
Peru	16 August 1975	Both countries established diplomatic relations on 16 August 1975.; Syria is accredited to Peru from its embassy in Santiago.; In 2023, the Syrian Foreign Ministry has expressed solidarity and condolences to the relatives of the victims of a Guayas earthquake that shook a coastal region of northern Peru.
Suriname	18 October 1976	Both countries established diplomatic relations on 18 October 1976.; In 2021, Suriname along with other ALBA members, expressed support for Syria in the civil war.
Trinidad and Tobago	11 January 1972	Both countries established diplomatic relations on 11 January 1972 when was accredited first Ambassador of Syrian Arab Republic (resident in Caracas) Mr. Bachir El Kotb.; Syria has an honorary consulate in Arima.
United States	17 November 1944	See Syria–United States relations: Both countries established diplomatic relations on 17 November 1944.; While relations between the two states have long since been tense, the two have maintained diplomatic exchanges. However, relations took an ominous turn in October 2008 with a cross-border raid during the Iraq War to ostensibly fend off the rise of allegedly foreign militants into the Iraq fighting for the Iraqi resistance.; In December 2012, US president Barack Obama announced the US would formally recognise the Syrian Opposition Coalition, rather than the Damascus government, as the legitimate representative of the Syrian people. As of 2023, the embassy of the United States is suspended due to the Syrian civil war. In May 2014, the US announced it recognised the opposition Syrian National Coalition's US offices as an official "foreign mission".; On 21 August 2013, the United States has threatened to strike key Syrian chemical and biological weapons installations in response to a chemical attack that was allegedly carried out by forces loyal to Assad on the rebel stronghold of Ghouta within the capital Damascus. Assad had denied any involvement, however President Obama claims to have intelligence proving otherwise. No proof has been given to the public other than reports from key United States senators and representatives. As of 4 September 2013, the Committee on Foreign Relations approved an attack with a 10–7 vote.; President Trump on 6 April 2017, ordered the first U.S. airstrike on the Syrian air force since the country's civil war began in 2011. US Navy warships USS Porter and USS Ross in the Mediterranean Sea launched dozens of Tomahawk missiles at Syria's Shayrat air base. The strikes were in reaction to what Washington says was a sarin poison gas attack by the government of Syrian President Bashar al-Assad that killed at least 70 people in the Idlib region of Syria. U.S. officials informed Russian forces ahead of the missile strikes, which Russian military were in Syria actively supporting and assisting al-Assad during Syria's civil war, and US air strikes avoided hitting Russian personnel. Trump, who authorized the launch of 59 Tomahawk missiles from Navy warships in the Mediterranean Sea on an air base near Homs were in direct response to Bashar al-Assad's alleged use of chemical weapons in the town of Khan Shaykhun on 4 April 2017. Following airstrikes were conducted on 8 April 2017, on the Syrian city that was the site of chemical weapons attack earlier.; On 7 October 2019, the President of the United States ordered the withdrawal of US military troops stationed on the Syrian-Turkey border. This withdrawal of military support was ordered by the President with disapproval of the Pentagon and the US Intelligence community. The US president ordered the withdrawal of military troops under the premise that Turkey would not invade the region being held by Syrian Democratic Forces (SDF); however Turkey attacked the SDF within 24 hours of US military withdrawal from the region.
Uruguay	11 October 1946	Both countries established diplomatic relations on 11 October 1946.; Syria is accredited to Uruguay from its embassy in Buenos Aires.; In 2019, Dr. Faisal Mekdad received a senior military delegation headed by Armed Forces of Uruguay Army Chief of Staff, Major General Marcelo Montaner. Both talked about preparations held by Uruguay to dispatch a military unit within the frame of the UNDOF in Golan.
Venezuela	14 June 1946	See Syria–Venezuela relations: Both countries established diplomatic relations on 14 June 1946.; Syria has an embassy in Caracas.; Venezuela has an embassy in Damascus.; Relations with Syria have improved following the election of Hugo Chávez. There are an estimated 1 million Venezuelans of Syrian heritage.; During the Venezuelan presidential crisis, Syria supported Nicolás Maduro.

=== Asia and Oceania ===
Syria's relations with the Arab world were strained by its support for Iran during the Iran–Iraq War, which began in 1980. With the end of the war in August 1988, Syria began a slow process of reintegration with the other Arab states. In 1989, it joined with the rest of the Arab world in readmitting Egypt to the 19th Arab League Summit at Casablanca.

This decision, prompted in part by Syria's need for Arab League support of its own position in Lebanon, marked the end of the Syrian-led opposition to Egypt and the 1977–79 Sadat initiatives toward Israel, as well as the Camp David Accords. It coincided with the end of the 10-year Arab subsidy to Syria and other front-line Arab countries pledged at Baghdad in 1978. Syria re-established full diplomatic relations with Egypt in 1989. In the 1990–1991 Gulf War, Syria joined other Arab states in the US-led multinational coalition against Iraq. In 1998, Syria began a slow rapprochement with Iraq, driven primarily by economic needs. In this period, Syria continued to play an active pan-Arab role, which intensified as the Israel-Palestine peace process collapsed in September 2000 with the start of the second Palestinian uprising (Intifada) against Israel. Though it voted in favor of UNSCR 1441 in 2002, Syria was against coalition military action in Iraq in 2003. However, the Syrian government accepted UNSCR 1483 (after being absent for the actual vote), which lifted sanctions on Iraq and established a framework to assist the Iraqi people in determining their political future and rebuilding their economy.

After start of the war in 2011, much of the Middle East condemned Syria's handling of the civil uprising, with only a few countries in the Middle East supporting Syria, most notably Iran, Iraq and Lebanon.

Country	Formal Relations Began	Notes
Abkhazia	4 September 2018	See Abkhazia–Syria relations: Syria has an embassy in Sukhumi.; Abkhazia had an embassy in Damascus. some staff were withdrawn on 15 December 2024.; As of December 2025, diplomatic relations between Syria and Abkhazia remain in place.
Afghanistan	18 November 1951	Both countries established diplomatic relations on 18 November 1951 when has been accredited Chargé d'Affaires ad interim of Afghanistan to Syria (Resident in Bagdad) Mr. Mir Amanullah Rahimi.; Afghan Taliban officials and Syrian minister met for the first time to discuss cooperation in 2023, but the Assad regime and the Taliban have no diplomatic relations. After the fall of the Assad regime, Afghan foreign minister Amir Khan Muttaqi congratulated the Syrian transitional government on its victory and expressed hope during a conversation with Asaad al-Shaibani that the two countries could establish regular diplomatic relations.
Armenia	6 March 1992	See Armenia–Syria relations: Both countries established diplomatic relations on 6 March 1992.; Armenia has an embassy in Damascus and a consulate general in Aleppo.; Since 1997, Syria has an embassy in Yerevan.; There are around 120,000 people of Armenian descent living in the Syria (See Armenians in Syria).
Australia	12 May 1975	Both countries established diplomatic relations on 12 May 1975 when first Australian ambassador to Syria Mr. P. N. Hutton presented credentials to President Hafez al-Assad.; Syria has an honorary consulates in Sydney and Melbourne.; Australia is accredited to Syria from its embassy in Beirut.; An Australian embassy was opened in Damascus in 1977. Syria opened an embassy in Canberra in the early 2000s.; Until the start of the current Syrian civil war in 2011, the two countries enjoyed good relations.; Since 2011, Australia has imposed autonomous sanctions on Syria.; Syrian embassy in Canberra was closed in 2012.
Bahrain	23 January 1975	See Bahrain–Syria relations: Both countries established diplomatic relations on 23 January 1975.; Syria has an embassy in Manama.; Bahrain reopened its embassy in Damascus in December 2018.; On 19 June 2022, Syrian President Bashar al-Assad received the credentials of Ambassador Waheed Mubarak Sayyar in an official ceremony attended by Foreign Minister Faisal Mekdad.; In 2024, Syrian President Bashar Al-Assad met with Bahrain's Foreign Minister Abdullatif bin Rashid Al Zayani in Damascus. It was the first visit by a Bahraini foreign minister to Syria in 13 years.; Both countries are members of Arab League.
Bangladesh	14 September 1973	See Bangladesh–Syria relations: Both countries established diplomatic relations on 14 September 1973.; Syria is accredited to Bangladesh from its embassy in New Delhi.; Bangladesh is accredited to Syria from its embassy in Cairo and is represented through an honorary consulate in Damascus.
China	1 August 1956	See China–Syria relations: China recognized Syria's independence in 1946.; Diplomatic relations between both countries were established on 1 August 1956.; Syria has an embassy in Beijing.; China has an embassy in Damascus; Both countries are close allies and strategic partners.; See Chinese Ministry of Foreign Affairs about the relations with Syria
Georgia	18 May 1993; Relations severed on 6 May 2018	Both countries established diplomatic relations on 18 May 1993.; Georgia terminated diplomatic relations with Syria due to the recognition of Abkhazia and South Ossetia by Damascus.
India	May 1950	See India-Syria relations: Both countries established diplomatic relations in May 1950.; Syria has an embassy in Delhi.; India has an embassy in Damascus.; India and Syria have historical and cultural links dating back to silk route trade. The countries maintained relatively cordial relations during the Syrian civil war.
Indonesia	27 February 1950	See Indonesia–Syria relations: Both countries established diplomatic relations on 27 February 1950.; Syria has an embassy in Jakarta.; Indonesia has an embassy in Damascus.; Both nations are the member of Non-Aligned Movement.
Iran	12 November 1946	See Iran–Syria relations: Both countries established diplomatic relations on 12 November 1946 when has been accredited Envoy Extraordinary and Plenipotentiary of Iran to Syria with residence in Beirut Mr. Zein-el-Abdine Rahnema.; Syria has an embassy in Tehran.; Iran has an embassy in Damascus.; Syria and Iran are strategic allies. Syria is often called Iran's "closest ally", the Arab nationalism ideology of Syria's ruling Baath party notwithstanding.; During the Iran–Iraq War, Syria sided with non-Arab Iran against its enemy Iraq and was isolated by Saudi Arabia and some of the Arab countries, with the exceptions of Libya, Lebanon, Algeria, Sudan and Oman.; Iran and Syria have had a strategic alliance ever since, partially due to their common animosity towards Saddam Hussein and coordination against the United States and Israel.; Syria and Iran cooperate on arms smuggling from Iran to the Hezbollah in Lebanon, which borders Israel.; In addition to receiving military hardware, Iran has consistently invested billions of dollars into the Syrian economy.; Currently, Iran is involved in implementing several industrial projects in Syria, including cement factories, car assembly lines, power plants, and silo construction. Iran also plans to set up a joint Iranian–Syrian bank in the future.
Iraq	8 November 1945	See Iraq–Syria relations: Both countries established diplomatic relations on 8 November 1945 when has been accredited Chargé d'Affaires of Iraq to Syria Mr. Ibrahim Fadli.; Syria has an embassy in Baghdad and Consulate-General in Mosul.; Iraq has an embassy in Damascus.; The political states of Iraq and Syria were formed by the United Kingdom and France following the defeat of the Ottoman Empire in World War I.; Iraq and Syria are united by historical, social, political, cultural and economic relations, but share a long foreign drawn border. The land known as Mesopotamia is Iraq and eastern Syria and is called such by its inhabitants.; Political relations between Iraq and Syria have in the past seen difficulties, however, new diplomatic relations described by both sides as "Historic" were established in November 2006, beginning an era of close cooperation and political friendship between Iraq and Syria.; During the early phase of the Syrian civil war, Iraq was also one of the few remaining Arab countries which support the Syrian government, and has abstained from voting to expel Syria from the Arab league.; Both countries have closely cooperated with each other against ISIS, with Iraq and Ba'athist Syria being a part of the Russia–Syria–Iran–Iraq coalition.
Israel	No formal diplomatic relations	See Israel–Syria relations: Syria has been an active belligerent, with periodic ceasefires and use of proxies, against Israel ever since May 1948, when the Syrian army captured territory from the newly established State of Israel north and south of the Sea of Galilee.; Syria was an active belligerent in the 1967 Arab–Israeli War, which resulted in Israel's occupation of the Golan Heights and the city of Quneitra. On 19 June, a week after the war ended, Israel offered to return the Golan if Syrian would agree to a full Peace Treaty. However, Syria refused. From 1967 to 1973 there were sporadic bouts of fighting along the new border.; Following the October 1973 Arab–Israeli War, which left Israel in occupation of additional Syrian territory, Syria accepted UN Security Council Resolution 338, which signaled an implicit acceptance of Resolution 242.; Syria participated in the Middle East Peace Conference in Madrid in October 1991.; In 2004 and 2005 Israel and Syria engaged in private talks discussing an outline peace accord. These were successful at a technical level, but failed to gain adequate political support.; Hostility between Syria and Israel further increased following Israel's execution of Operation Orchard on 6 September 2007. Israel bombed a northern Syrian complex near Dayr az-Zawr which was suspected of holding nuclear materials from North Korea.; In 2008 Syrian President Bashar al-Assad confirmed that talks with Israel have resumed through a third party.; Buthaina Shaaban has also confirmed that Israel is ready to give up the Golan Heights.; In October 2019, Israel was one of the countries that condemned the Turkish offensive into north-eastern Syria, but also because of deterioration of Israel–Turkey relations.
Japan	December 1953	See Japan–Syria relations: Both countries established diplomatic relations in December 1953.; Syria has an embassy in Tokyo.; Japan has an embassy in Damascus.; Japan introduced sanctions against Syria in September 2011.
Jordan	1948	See Jordan–Syria relations: Both countries established diplomatic relations in 1948.; Syria has an embassy in Amman.; Jordan has an embassy in Damascus.; After the first Gulf War relations between Jordan and Syria had improved. After the Treaty of Peace Between the State of Israel and the Hashemite Kingdom of Jordan in which Jordan established diplomatic ties with Israel, Jordan has been an important transit point for Syrian businessmen doing business in the Palestinian territories.; Relations between the two countries improved after the death of Jordan's King Hussein Ibn Talal and accession of King Abdullah in February 1999 and the death of Hafez al-Assad and accession of his son Bashar in 2000. The Jordanian King visited Syria to congratulate Bashar that year.; During the Syrian civil war, Jordan has worked closely with the US, supporting the Southern Front rebels until 2017, but also co-ordinating closely with Russia.; After 2018, relations between both countries normalized.; Both countries are members of Arab League.
Kazakhstan	27 March 1992	Both countries established diplomatic relations on 27 March 1992.; Kazakhstan has a consulate-general in Damascus.; Kazakhstan donated funds to help Syrian refugees fleeing the country. In 2012, about $400,000 were allocated by the country through the OIC.; Kazakhstan sent its next humanitarian aid to Syria in January 2017. The 500 tonnes of supply of food and medications were delivered to Tartus Port on the Mediterranean coast of Syria.
Kuwait	24 October 1963	See Kuwait–Syria relations: Both countries established diplomatic relations on 24 October 1963; Syria has an embassy in Kuwait City.; Kuwait has an embassy in Damascus.; Kuwait–Syria relations became somewhat strained due to the Syrian civil war after Kuwait closed its embassies along with the rest of the Arab States of the Persian Gulf.; Bilaterial relations have since come to focus on humanitarian efforts for Syria instead. For example, Kuwait has hosted three international pledging conferences in 2013, 2014, 2015, and 2016 raising 1.5bn, 2.4bn, 3.8bn, and 10bn respectively.; Relations between the two countries have since 2019 normalized.; Both countries are members of Arab League.
Lebanon	15 October 2008	See Lebanon-Syria relations Syria plays an important role in Lebanon by virtue of its history, size, power, and economy. Lebanon was part of Ottoman Syria until 1926. The presence of Syrian troops in Lebanon dates to 1976, when President Hafez al-Assad intervened in the Lebanese civil war on behalf of Maronite Christians. Following the 1982 Israeli invasion of Lebanon, Syrian and Israeli forces clashed in eastern Lebanon. The late U.S. Ambassador Philip Habib negotiated a cease-fire in Lebanon and the subsequent evacuation of PLO fighters from West Beirut. However, Syrian opposition blocked implementation of the 17 May 1983 Lebanese-Israeli accord on the withdrawal of Israeli forces from Lebanon. Following the February 1984 withdrawal of the UN Multinational Force from Beirut and the departure of most of Israel's forces from southern Lebanon a year later, Syria launched an unsuccessful initiative to reconcile warring Lebanese factions and establish a permanent cease-fire. Syria actively participated in the March–September 1989 fighting between the Christian Lebanese Forces and Muslim forces allied with Syria. In 1989, Syria endorsed the Charter of National Reconciliation, or "Taif Accord", a comprehensive plan for ending the Lebanese conflict negotiated under the auspices of Saudi Arabia, Algeria, and Morocco. At the request of Lebanese President Hrawi, the Syrian military took joint action with the Lebanese Armed Forces on 13 October 1990, to oust rebel Gen. Michel Aoun who had defied efforts at reconciliation with the legitimate Government of Lebanon. The process of disarming and disbanding the many Lebanese militias began in earnest in early 1991. In May 1991, Lebanon and Syria signed the treaty of brotherhood, cooperation, and coordination called for in the Taif Accord, which is intended to provide the basis for many aspects of Syrian-Lebanese relations. The treaty provides the most explicit recognition to date by the Syrian Government of Lebanon's independence and sovereignty. According to the U.S. interpretation of the Taif Accord, Syria and Lebanon were to have decided on the redeployment of Syrian forces from Beirut and other coastal areas of Lebanon by September 1992. Israeli occupation of Lebanon until May 2000, the breakdown of peace negotiations between Syria and Israel that same year, and intensifying Arab/Israeli tensions since the start of the second Palestinian uprising in September 2000 have helped delay full implementation of the Taif Accords. The UN declared that Israel's withdrawal from southern Lebanon fulfilled the requirements of UN Security Council Resolution 425. However, Syria and Lebanon claimed that UNSCR 425 had not been fully implemented because Israel did not withdraw from an area of the Golan Heights called Shebaa Farms, which had been occupied by Israel in 1967, and which Syria now claimed was part of Lebanon. The United Nations does not recognize this claim. However, Lebanese resistance groups such as Hezbollah use it to justify attacks against Israeli forces in that region, creating a potentially dangerous flashpoint along the Lebanon-Israeli border. In 2005, Syrian troops withdrew from Lebanon after the assassination of Lebanese Sunni Prime Minister Rafik Hariri on 14 February 2005. In December 2008, The Syrian Embassy was opened in Beirut for the first time in history since both countries gained their Independence during the 1940s. In March 2009, Lebanon followed and opened its embassy in Damascus. On 19 December 2009, Lebanese Prime Minister Saad Al-Hariri visited Syria, and stayed in Damascus for three days meeting with President Bashar Al-Assad & breaking the ice between the two sides.
Malaysia	1958	See Malaysia–Syria relations: Syria has an embassy in Kuala Lumpur; Malaysian embassy in Damascus is closed since August 2012, due to the Syrian civil war.; Malaysia has an honorary consulate in Damascus.
Mongolia	31 July 1967	See Bilateral relations between Mongolia and Syria (in Mongolian): Both countries established diplomatic relations on 31 July 1967.; Mongolian delegates from the then-ruling Mongolian People's Revolutionary Party traveled to Syria in 1978, 1982 and 1985.; Syrian Arab Socialist Ba'ath Party delegates visited Mongolia in 1983 and 1986.
North Korea	25 July 1966	See North Korea–Syria relations: Both countries established diplomatic relations on 25 July 1966.; Syria has an embassy in Pyongyang.; North Korea has an embassy in Damascus.; North Korea is one of Syria's closest allies.; In September 2015, the Syrian government paid tribute to Kim Il Sung in a ceremony for a new park in Damascus named in his honor.
Oman	19 December 1987	See Oman–Syria relations: Both countries established diplomatic relations on 19 December 1987.; Syria has an embassy in Muscat.; Oman has an embassy in Damascus.; Since the start of the war, Syria and Oman have been strategic allies.; Both countries are members of Arab League.
Pakistan	1948	See Pakistan–Syria relations: Syria has an embassy in Islamabad.; Pakistan has an embassy in Damascus.; Both countries were on the silk route through which civilizational exchanges took place for centuries, Islamic missionaries that introduced Islam after 711 AD were from Syria. During the Yom Kippur War of 1973 (usually referred to as the Ramadan war in Pakistan) several Pakistani pilots assisted the Syrian air force. In 2005 Syria and Pakistan agreed on mutual cooperation in the fields of science and technology. Pakistan also supports the Syrian Government since the beginning of Syrian civil war.
Palestine	22 January 1992	See Palestine–Syria relations: Syria officially recognized Palestinian statehood on 18 July 2011.; Syria is accredited to Palestine from its embassy in Amman.; Palestine has an embassy in Damascus.
Philippines	4 September 1946	Both countries established diplomatic relations on 4 September 1946.; Syria has a consulate in Manila.; Syria is accredited to Philippines from its embassy in Kuala Lumpur.; The Philippines has an embassy in Damascus.
Qatar	19 January 1972	See Qatar–Syria relations: Both countries established diplomatic relations on 19 January 1972.; Syrian President Hafez al-Assad sided with Saudi Arabia against Qatari Emir Hamad bin Khalifa when he deposed his father. Later on, Bashar al-Assad visited Doha in 2003, which initiated a new chapter of economic, trading and investment relations.; In 2007–8, several Qatari-funded banks were established in Syria.; During the conflict in Syria, Qatar vocally and materially supported different rebels with arms and funds against the government. Qatar has been the biggest sponsor of Syrian opposition forces during the civil war.; In January 2019, Qatar said it would not normalise relations with Syria, which it wanted to remain excluded from the Arab League.; In April 2019, Qatar Airways was granted a license to fly over Syrian airspace and a Syrian ban on Qatar's Al-Jazeera station was lifted.; In 2021, Qatar worked with Russia and Turkey to create a political solution to the conflict.
Saudi Arabia	26 June 1944	See Saudi Arabia–Syria relations: Both countries established diplomatic relations on 26 June 1944 when has been accredited Envoy Extraordinary and Minister Plenipotentiary of Saudi Arabia to Syria Sheikh Abdul Aziz bin Zeid.; Syria has an embassy in Riyadh.; Saudi Arabia has an embassy in Damascus.; Following the Syrian civil war, the relations between the two countries have greatly deteriorated (until 2018).; Between 2018 and 2023, both countries made a gradual reaprochement.; Both countries are members of the Arab League.
South Korea	10 April 2025	See South Korea–Syria relations: Both countries established diplomatic relations on 10 April 2025.; On February 8, 2025, Syrian Foreign Minister Asaad al-Shaibani met with Kim Eun-jeong, Director-General for African and Middle Eastern Affairs in Damascus. During the meeting, both parties conveyed their willingness to renew cooperation, which had been suspended since 2003. Three days later, the South Korean Foreign Ministry announced that the country would establish diplomatic relations with Syria.; On 11 March 2025, a tentative deal was struck for both nations to establish diplomatic relations.
South Ossetia	22 July 2018	Syria had recognized South Ossetia and maintaied diplomatic relations with Tskhinvali.; The status of Syria's relationship with South Ossetia is presently unknown following the fall of the al-Assad regime on 8 December 2024.
Sri Lanka	10 May 1969	Both countries established diplomatic relations on 10 May 1969.; Syria is accredited to Sri Lanka from its embassy in New Delhi.; Sri Lanka is accredited to Syria from its embassy in Beirut, but it has an honorary consulate in Damascus.; Syrian President Hafez al-Assad visited Colombo, Sri Lanka in 1976.
Turkey	8 March 1946	See Syria–Turkey relations Both countries established diplomatic relations on 8 March 1946. Diplomatic relations suspended since 2011. Syrian–Turkish relations have long been strained even though Turkey shares its longest common border with Syria and various other geographic, cultural, and historical links tie the two neighboring states together. This friction has been due to disputes including the self annexation of the Hatay Province to Turkey in 1939, water disputes resulting from the Southeastern Anatolia Project, and Syria's support for the outlawed Kurdistan Workers' Party (PKK) and the Armenian Secret Army for the Liberation of Armenia (ASALA), but relations have improved greatly since October 1998; when PKK leader Abdullah Öcalan was expelled by Syrian authorities. Syria had embassy in Ankara and two consulates–general in Istanbul and Gaziantep. Both countries have been full members of the Union for the Mediterranean and the Organisation of Islamic Cooperation (OIC), although Syria's membership in the former was suspended in 2011 as well as from the latter in 2012. Because of the Syrian civil war relations between Syria and Turkey have become increasingly tense. Turkey closed its embassy in Damascus on 26 March 2012, as well as its consulate–general in Aleppo. In April 2012 it hosted the second meeting of the Friends of Syria, the Arab-Western coalition in support of the Syrian opposition. Turkey has been taking in refugees from Syria, although abuse and injustice towards the Syrian refugees has been reported. Relations have further been degraded due to a serious incident that occurred with the Syrian downing of a Turkish military training flight in June 2012. Relations worsened further in May 2013 following a border incident involving two car bombs exploding in the town of Reyhanlı, Hatay Province, Turkey. At least 43 people were killed and 140 more were injured in the attack. The car bombs were left outside Reyhanlı's town hall and post office. The first exploded at around 13:45 local time (10:45 GMT)[40] and the second exploded about 15 minutes later. The issue that cemented the crack in the relations was Turkey's reported dealings with the Islamic State (an enemy of the Syrian government) in oil and weapons by various sources. A video surfacing of the Islamic State being unopposed by Turkish security as they traveled across the border between Syria, questions more of Turkey's alleged role of simply fighting terrorism. Turkish Military troops attacked the Kurdish backed Syrian Democratic Forces (SDF) on 8 October 2019, after the acting US President Donald Trump recalled US military troops from Syria the previous day. The US action to move troops out of the region was done so solely by the US president with stern disapproval by US military intelligence departments. Turkey re-established diplomatic relations with Syria on 14 December 2024, following the fall of the al-Assad regime. Should Turkey, which is a candidate for EU membership, accede to the EU, Syria will be a border neighbor with the European Union.
United Arab Emirates	19 January 1972	See Syria–UAE relations: Both countries established diplomatic relations on 19 January 1972.; Syria has an embassy in Abu Dhabi and a consulate-general in Dubai.; UAE has an embassy in Damascus.; Both countries are members of the Arab League.; In 2016, the Emirates was planning to normalize its relations with Syria, but was barred by the US.; UAE re-opened its Damascus embassy in December 2018.; In November 2021, the UAE Foreign Minister Abdullah bin Zayed Al Nahyan travelled to Damascus to meet Bashar al-Assad. He was the first Emirati official to visit Syria, since the war. The US strongly opposed efforts to normalize ties with Syria.; On 18 March 2022, Assad travelled to the UAE to meet Emirati leaders, including Abu Dhabi's Sheikh Mohamed bin Zayed Al Nahyan and Dubai's Sheikh Mohammed bin Rashid Al Maktoum. It was Assad's first visit to an Arab nation since 2011. On 19 March 2023, Assad visited the UAE again, with his wife Asma al-Assad.
Yemen	23 May 1965	See Syria–Yemen relations: Both countries established diplomatic relations on 23 May 1965.; Syria has an embassy in Sanaa.; Between 2014 and 2023, Yemen's embassy in Damascus (and its ambassador) was under supervision of Houthi-led Supreme Political Council.; In 2023, Syria returned embassy to the internationally recognized Yemeni government.; Both countries normalized relations in 2023.; Both countries are members of the Arab League.

=== Europe ===
The Czech Republic and Austria were the only European Union countries which never closed its embassies in Damascus throughout the Syrian civil war. Greece and Cyprus re-established diplomatic relations with Syria and opened their embassies in 2021, making them the first EU countries to do so. Bulgaria, Hungary and Romania appointed a chargé d'affaires to their diplomatic missions in the country. In July 2024, Italy decided to re-establish relations with Syria, appoint its special envoy and chargé d'affaires to the country and reopen its embassy in Damascus. Following the fall of the Assad regime, Germany and France became the first European Union countries to visit Damascus. On 16 January 2025, Spain reopened its Embassy in Damascus. On 20 March 2025, Germany reopened its Embassy in Damascus.

Country	Formal Relations Began	Notes
Austria	7 February 1952	See Austria–Syria relations: Both countries established diplomatic relations on 7 February 1952.; Syria has an embassy in Vienna.; Austria has an embassy in Damascus since 1978.
Belarus	26 August 1993	See Belarus–Syria relations: The diplomatic relations between Belarus and Syria started on 26 August 1993.; Syria has an embassy in Minsk.; Belarus has an embassy in Damascus. Belarusian diplomatic personnel were withdrawn from Syria on 15 December 2024.
Belgium	20 March 1946	See Belgium–Syria relations: Both countries established diplomatic relations on 20 March 1946 when has been appointed M.R. Taymans as Chargé d'Affaires of Belgium to Syria with residence in Beirut.; Syria has an embassy in Brussels.; Embassy of Belgium in Damascus was closed on 29 March 2012.
Bosnia and Herzegovina	1 December 1994	Both countries established diplomatic relations on 1 December 1994.; Syria is accredited to Bosnia from its embassy in Belgrade.
Bulgaria	24 August 1954	See Bulgaria–Syria relations: Both countries established diplomatic relations on 24 August 1954.; Syria has an embassy in Sofia.; Since May 1955, Bulgaria has embassy in Damascus and an honorary consulate in Aleppo.
Croatia	29 August 1997	See Croatia–Syria relations: Both countries established diplomatic relations on 29 August 1997.; Syria is represented in Croatia through its embassy in Budapest and its honorary consulate in Zagreb.; Croatia is represented in Syria through its embassy in Cairo, Egypt and an honorary consulate in Damascus.; Diplomatic relations were terminated in 2012.
Cyprus	1 February 1962	See Cyprus–Syria relations: Both countries established diplomatic relations on 1 February 1962 when Cyprus has agreed to the appointment of Thabit al-Aris, as Syrian Ambassador to Cyprus.; Syria has an embassy in Nicosia.; Cyprus has an embassy in Damascus.; Both countries re-established relations in 2021.; Syrian president Bashar al-Assad became the first Syrian head of state to visit Cyprus in November 2010, resulting in the signing of five agreements between the two countries and pledges to work closer together on issues of common interest.; Christofias awarded al-Assad the Grand Collar of the Order of Makarios III, while the Syrian leader presented Christofias with the National Order of Ummayya with the Grand Sash.; Cyprus Foreign Affairs: List of bilateral treaties with Syria
Czech Republic	20 September 1946	Syria and Czechoslovakia established diplomatic relations on 20 September 1946.; Syria has an embassy in Prague.; Czech Republic has an embassy in Damascus.
Denmark	6 July 1953 (relations suspended 2012)	See Denmark–Syria relations: Both countries established diplomatic relations on 6 July 1953 when has been accredited Envoy Extraordinary and plenipotentiary of Syria to Denmark with residence in Stockholm Jamal E. D. Farra.; Syria is accredited to Denmark from its embassy in Stockholm.; Denmark was represented in Syria through its embassy in Damascus until 2012, when relations between the two countries were severed.; Following the Jyllands-Posten Muhammad cartoons controversy and subsequent attack on the Danish embassy in 2006, relations between the two countries were greatly strained.
Finland	22 May 1953	Both countries established diplomatic relations on 22 May 1953.; Syria is accredited to Finland from its embassy in Stockholm.; Finland had an embassy in Damascus which closed in March 2012, and two honorary consulates in Aleppo and Latakia.; Ministry for Foreign Affairs of Finland about relations with Syria
France	18 June 1946	See France–Syria relations: Both countries established diplomatic relations on 18 June 1946.; Syria has an embassy in Paris and honorary consulates in Marseille and Pointe-à-Pitre.; France had an embassy in Damascus and a consulate general in Aleppo, both were closed on 2 March 2012.; France was the first Western country to give recognition to the SOC on 13 November 2012.
Germany	14 October 1952 (Note: Syria and Egypt formed together the United Arab Republic from 22 February 1958, to 28 September 1961. Syria regained its independence on 28 September 1961, and Egypt kept the name "United Arab Republic" until 1971.)	See Germany–Syria relations: Both countries established diplomatic relations on 14 October 1952.; Syria has an embassy in Berlin and honorary consulate in Bremen.; The German embassy in Damascus was reopened on 20 March 2025.; Germany hosts the most Syrian refugees in the EU.; Relations were severed from 1965 to 1974 after Germany's establishing relations with Israel.
Greece	24 June 1947	See Greece–Syria relations: Both countries established diplomatic relations on 24 June 1947 when has been accredited Envoy Extraordinary and minister Plenipotentiary of Greece to Syria with residence in Cairo Mr. Georges Triandafyllides.; Syria has an embassy in Athens.; Greece has an embassy in Damascus.; On 8 May 2020, the Greek Foreign Minister Nikos Dendias announced a restoration of relations between Greece and Syria and assigned former ambassador to Syria and Russia, Tasia Athanassiou, as a Special Envoy of Greece's Foreign Ministry for Syria.; See Greeks in Syria; Greek Foreign Affairs Ministry about relations with Syria
Holy See	21 February 1953	See Holy See–Syria relations: Both countries established diplomatic relations on 21 February 1953.; Syria has an embassy in Rome.; The Holy See has a nunciature in Damascus.; At present, the Holy See has comparatively good relations with Syria. It has sought to foster ecumenism between rival Christian factions in Antioch and to ensure the survival of age-old Christian communities in the country. The declaration Nostra aetate has made possible inter-faith dialogue and cooperation with Syrian Muslims.; Some Vatican leaders have also sought to foster greater political independence for Lebanon, which has been tied to Syria since the end of the Lebanese civil war. This call for Lebanese independence has traditionally been resisted by Syrian leaders.; John Paul II visited Syria in 2001 and was the first pope to have been to an Islamic mosque, the Umayyad Mosque in Damascus, which includes the relics of John the Baptist.; Syrian President Bashar al-Assad attended Pope John Paul II's funeral.
Hungary	13 October 1954	See Hungary–Syria relations: Both countries established diplomatic relations on 13 October 1954.; Syria has an embassy in Budapest.; Hungary has an embassy in Damascus and honorary consulates in Aleppo and Latakia.; Hungary sent diplomats to procure consular affairs in 2020.
Ireland	18 July 1975	Both countries established diplomatic relations on 18 July 1975.; Syria is represented in Ireland through its embassy in Paris, France.; Ireland is represented in Syria through its embassy in Cairo, Egypt and an honorary consulate in Damascus.
Italy	27 September 1947	See Italy–Syria relations: Both countries established diplomatic relations on 27 September 1947 when has been accredited Envoy Extraordinary and Minister Plenipotentiary of Italy to Syria Mr. Luigi Cortese.; Syrian embassy in Rome was reopened in 2024.; Italian embassy in Damascus was reopened in 2024, after its closure at early stage of war in March 2012.; In 2019, Italy announced it was considering re-opening its embassy, and in July 2024 it decided to appoint an ambassador to Syria, the first such move since 2012. Italy is the first G7 nation to restore diplomatic ties with Syria.
Moldova	20 May 1993	Both countries established diplomatic relations on 20 May 1993.; Syria is accredited to Moldova from its embassy in Bucharest and honorary consulate in Chișinău.
Netherlands	24 January 1952	See Netherlands–Syria relations: Both countries established diplomatic relations on 24 January 1952 when Mr. Knoop Koopmans was accredited to Syria.; Syria is accredited to the Netherlands from its embassy in Brussels.; The Netherlands closed its embassy in Syria in March 2012.
Norway	11 August 1948	See Norway–Syria relations: Both countries established diplomatic relations on 11 August 1948.; Syria is accredited to Norway from its embassy in Stockholm.; Norwegian embassy in Damascus was closed in March 2012.
Poland	18 September 1945	Both countries established diplomatic relationbs on 18 September 1945.; Syria has an embassy in Warsaw.; Poland had an embassy in Damascus which closed in July 2012 due to security reasons.
Portugal	19 February 1975	Both countries established diplomatic relations on 19 February 1975.; Syria is accredited to Portugal from its embassy in Madrid.; Portugal is accredited to Syria from its embassy in Nicosia.
Romania	9 August 1955	See Romania–Syria relations: Both countries established diplomatic relations on 9 August 1955.; Syria has an embassy in Bucharest.; Romania has an embassy in Damascus and 2 honorary consulates in Aleppo and Latakia.
Russia	25 July 1944	See Russia–Syria relations: Both countries established diplomatic relations on 25 July 1944.; Syria has an embassy in Moscow.; Russia has an embassy in Damascus and a consulate in Aleppo.; As with most of the Arab countries, Russia enjoys a historically strong and stable friendly relationship with Syria.; Since 1971, Russia has leased port facilities in Tartus for its naval fleet. Between 1992 and 2008 these facilities were much in disrepair, however, works have commenced concurrent with the 2008 South Ossetia war to improve the port's facilities to support an increased Mediterranean presence of the Russian Navy.; Russia is believed to have sent Syria dozens of Iskander missiles.; Russia has been strongly supporting Syria in the Syrian civil war, especially since the start of an air campaign in 2015.
Serbia	18 May 1946	See Serbia–Syria relations: Both countries established diplomatic relations on 18 May 1946 when has been accredited Envoy Extraordinary and Minister Plenipotentiary of Yugoslavia to Syria Mr. Esref Badnjevic.; Syria has an embassy in Belgrade.; Serbia has an embassy in Damascus.; Also, Syria is a member of the Non-Aligned Movement and Serbia is an observer state.; Serbia was of the few close allies in Europe of the Baathist Syrian government.
Slovakia	1 January 1993	Both countries established diplomatic relations on 1 January 1993.; Syria is accredited to Slovakia from its embassy in Vienna and honorary consulate in Bratislava.; Slovakia had an embassy in Syria until 2012, when it transferred it to Beirut for security reasons.; In 2015, it was definitively moved to Beirut.
Slovenia	25 August 1997	Both countries established diplomatic relations on 25 August 1997.; Syria is accredited to Slovenia from its embassy in Vienna.; In November 2021, during a visit to the Syrian pavilion at Expo 2020 in Dubai, the ministerial delegation of Slovenia confirmed unofficially its interest in re-establishing relations with Syria.
Spain	3 April 1948	See Spain–Syria relations: Both countries established diplomatic relations on 3 April 1948.; Syria has an embassy in Madrid.; Spain has an embassy in Damascus.
Sweden	24 June 1947	See Sweden–Syria relations: Both countries established diplomatic relations on 24 June 1947 when with accredation of Envoy Extraordinary and Minister Plenipotentiary of Sweden to Syria with residence in Cairo Mr. Widar Bagge.; Sweden has an embassy in Damascus and honorary consulate in Aleppo.; Syria is represented in Sweden through its embassy in Stockholm, Sweden.
Switzerland	1945	See Switzerland–Syria relations: Syria has a consulate general in Geneva.; Switzerland closed its embassy in Damascus in 2012 for security reasons.; Switzerland has a humanitarian presence in Damascus since 2017, through an office that coordinates Swiss humanitarian activities in Syria. Although the embassy in Damascus is closed, diplomatic relations between Switzerland and Syria have not been broken off.
Ukraine	31 March 1992	See Syria–Ukraine relations: Syria recognised independent Ukraine on 28 December 1991.; Until 2011, relations were positive and mainly oriented on scientific-technical, trade and economic cooperation.; After 11 years of frozen relations, Ukraine severed diplomatic relations with Syria on 30 June 2022, when Damascus recognized the Donetsk and Luhansk People's Republics.; Syria formally broke its diplomatic ties to Ukraine on 20 July 2022, citing the principle of reciprocity.; Ukraine opened an honorary consulate in Damascus during a visit by foreign minister Andrii Sybiha to Syria on 30 December 2024, signalling a warming in relations following the fall of the Assad regime.; On 2 January 2025, Ukrainian President Volodymyr Zelenskyy announced plans to re-establish diplomatic relations with Syria.; Diplomatic relations were officially re-established on 24 September 2025.
United Kingdom	21 May 1942	See Syria–United Kingdom relations British Foreign Secretary David Lammy with Syrian Foreign Minister Asaad al-Shaibani in Riyadh, January 2025. Syria re-established diplomatic relations with the United Kingdom on 5 July 2025.: Syria's embassy in London remains closed despite the re-establishment of diplomatic relations.; The UK 's embassy in Damascus is currently closed with all consular operations suspended.; Both countries share common membership of the United Nations, the World Health Organization, and the World Trade Organization. Bilaterally the two countries have a Development Partnership.

== Membership in international organizations ==
Syria is a member of the Arab Bank for Economic Development in Africa, Arab Fund for Economic and Social Development, Arab Industrial Development and Mining Organization, Arab League, Arab Monetary Fund, Arab Parliament, Arab States Broadcasting Union, ALBA (observer), Asian–African Legal Consultative Organization, Asian Parliamentary Assembly, Association of Arab Universities, Bureau International des Expositions, Council of Arab Economic Unity, Customs Cooperation Council, Economic and Social Council, Economic and Social Commission for Western Asia, European Broadcasting Union (associate member), FEAS, Food and Agriculture Organization, Group of 24, Group of 77, International Atomic Energy Agency, International Bank for Reconstruction and Development, International Centre for Settlement of Investment Disputes, International Civil Aviation Organization, International Confederation of Arab Trade Unions, International Chamber of Commerce, International Development Association, Islamic Development Bank (suspended 2012), International Fund for Agricultural Development, International Finance Corporation, International Labour Organization, International Monetary Fund, International Maritime Organization, Intelsat, Interpol, International Olympic Committee, International Organization for Standardization, IRENA (acceding), International Solar Alliance, International Telecommunication Union, Multilateral Investment Guarantee Agency, Non-Aligned Movement, Organization of Arab Petroleum Exporting Countries, Organisation of Islamic Cooperation, Organisation for the Prohibition of Chemical Weapons (joined 2013, suspended 2021), OTIF, Parliamentary Assembly of the Mediterranean, UN, UN Commission on Human Rights, UN Conference on Trade and Development, UNESCO, UN Industrial Development Organization, UN Relief and Works Agency for Palestine Refugees in the Near East, Union for the Mediterranean (suspended 2011), Universal Postal Union, World Bank, World Court, World Customs Organization, World Federation of Trade Unions, World Health Organization, WHO Regional Office for the Eastern Mediterranean, World Intellectual Property Organization, World Meteorological Organization, World Tourism Organization and International Federation of Red Cross and Red Crescent Societies.

Syria's two-year term as a nonpermanent member of the UN Security Council ended in December 2003. Syria was elected to the executive of the World Health Organization in 2021.

=== Arab League ===
Syria was temporarily suspended from the Arab League since the beginning of the Syrian civil war. Six of the Arab states of the Persian Gulf recognised the Syrian National Coalition as Syria's only legitimate representative on 12 November 2012, but Iraq, Algeria and Lebanon prevented the Arab League from following suit. On 26 March 2013, at the Arab league summit in Doha, the League recognised the National Coalition for Syrian Revolutionary and Opposition Forces, as the legitimate representatives of the Syrian people. The National Coalition was henceforth granted Damascus' seat at the summit.

This act of recognition was opposed by Algeria, Iraq and Lebanon. On 9 March 2014, secretary general Nabil al-Arabi said that Syria's seat would remain vacant until the opposition completes the formation of its institutions. In late 2018, Egypt, Tunisia and Morocco began lobbying for Syria's return to the League.

In December 2018, after American president Donald Trump announced the partial withdrawal of U.S. troops from Syria, some countries initiated reopening of their diplomatic relations with Syria. Diplomatic relations have returned with Iraq, Saudi Arabia (in 2023), Egypt (after 3 July 2013), Tunisia, UAE (after 2018), Jordan (after 2021), Lebanon (after 2021), Algeria, Mauritania (after 2018), Bahrain (after 2018), Kuwait (after 2018), Libya, Oman, Comoros, Sudan (after 2018), Yemen, Somalia and Palestine.

Following the visit of Sudanese President Omar al-Bashir, the Arab League initiated the process of readmission of the Syrian Arab Republic to the organization, while the United Arab Emirates reopened their embassy in Syria on 27 December, and Bahrain announced its intentions to reopen their embassies.

After the devastating 2023 Turkey–Syria earthquake, the Saudis, Emirati, Algerians, Iraqis and Jordanians contributed significantly to the relief effort. A week before, Al-Assad travelled to Oman for his first foreign visit since the quake.

On 26 February 2023, President Bashar al-Assad had met with Iraqi, Jordanian, Palestinian, Libyan, Egyptian and Emirati speakers of legislative bodies, as well as representatives from Oman and Lebanon on behalf of Arab Inter-Parliamentary Union, to discuss further cooperation between the Arab states and Syria.

In early April 2023, Saudi Arabia had invited Syria's Assad to the Arab League summit, ending regional isolation. On 13 April 2023, Syrian Foreign Minister Faisal Mekdad arrived in Jeddah to meet Saudi Foreign Minister Faisal bin Farhan. After frayed relations during the Syrian civil war, both nations now seek "a political solution to the Syrian crisis that preserves the unity, security and stability of Syria," according to the Saudi foreign ministry.

On 15 April 2023, foreign ministers of GCC+3 format met in Jeddah and discussed the return of Syria to the regional organisation and so called Arab peace plan.

On 18 April 2023, Saudi Foreign Minister Prince Faisal bin Farhan travelled to Damascus, met with Syrian President Assad and discussed further steps. The summit is scheduled for 19 May 2023.

On 7 May 2023, at the meeting of the Council of the Arab League in Cairo composed of foreign ministers, was agreed to reinstate Syria's membership in the Arab League.

Earlier, Kuwait and Qatar had opposed al-Assad's presence at the Arab League summit. The regional normalisation effort had caught the U.S. and its European allies by surprise, as they were opposing an "Arab-led political path" in solving the crisis. According to the statement, al-Assad would be allowed to the meeting on 19 May 2023, if "he wishes to do so". The new political process in Syria was described as the "Jordanian Initiative".

Nevertheless, Syria remains under international sanctions after millions of Syrians had been displaced or sought refuge in Arab and European countries during the war. The changes to the relations between Syria and other Arab States would allow many of them to return to their homeland, according to the announcements made earlier by Jordanian and Saudi officials.

== International disputes ==
- Western Golan Heights with Israel;
- dispute with upstream riparian Turkey over Turkish water development plans for the Tigris and Euphrates rivers
- separation of the Hatay State and subsequent incorporation into the Turkish state
- dispute with Turkey concerning the Turkish occupation of North Syria
- dispute with the United States over the American-led intervention and occupation of Syrian territory
- illicit drugs: a transit point for opiates and hashish bound for regional and Western markets, as well as captagon

== See also ==
- Ministry of Foreign Affairs and Expatriates (Syria)
- List of diplomatic missions in Syria
- List of diplomatic missions of Syria
- Foreign policy of the Bashar al-Assad regime
- Sanctions against Syria
