= Croatia–Syria relations =

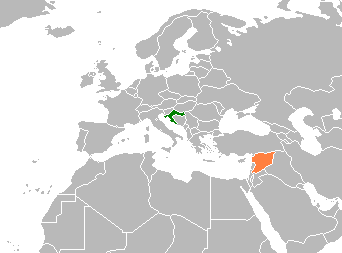

- Croatia: Syria

Croatia–Syria relations are the bilateral relations between Croatia and Syria. Both countries established diplomatic relations on 29 August 1997. Croatia is represented in Syria through its embassy in Cairo in Egypt and an honorary consulate in Damascus. Syria is represented in Croatia through its embassy in Budapest, Hungary and an honorary consulate in Zagreb.

In 2012, relations between the two countries soured, and in 2013, Croatia recognised the Syrian opposition as the sole legitimate representatives of the Syrian people.

== History ==
Croatia and Syria signed a treaty establishing bilateral relations between the countries on 29 August 1997. In 1998 Syrian representative Souren Seraydaria was the Head of Support Group of the United Nations Civilian Police Support Group in eastern Croatia. By the 2000s, Croatia and Syria had active trade exchanges, while Syria exported foodstuffs, vegetables, cotton materials and imports from its chemical materials, oil and gas equipment, and sea products to Croatia. On 18 July 2008, Croatia and Syria signed an agreement on prevention of double taxation; and on 21 December 2008, the countries signed an agreement on air transport.

After the start of the Syrian Civil War in 2011, relations between the two countries turned less positive. On 23 February 2012, Croatian prime minister Zoran Milanović called on Croatian companies to follow the Croatian national oil company INA and withdraw from Syria due to the ongoing armed conflict. He said that companies have to pull out until a democratic order is implemented in Syria. Deputy prime minister Radimir Čačić said INA's decision to halt operations in Syria brought Croatia in line with EU sanctions against doing business in Syria.

Syrian Oil Minister Sufian Allaw accused INA for incorrectness towards Syrian people and stated that withdrawal of INA from Syria was a cringe to the European Union, since Croatia wasn't an EU member at the time. Allaw also confirmed that INA's return to Syria is impossible because of such matters. Nevertheless, on 27 August 2012, in an interview for Večernji list the Governor of the Homs Governorate and close associate of Syria's president Bashar al-Assad, Ahmed Munir, called Croatia a great friend of Syria and stated that INA would be able to return once situation in Syria becomes calm. Croatia suffers damage of hundreds of millions of Euros due to the sanctions it applies on Syria together with other 27 EU member states as well as many other members of the international community. Croatian entrepreneurs are forbidden to sell weapons, ammunition and military vehicles to Syria and also to purchase, import or transfer Syrian oil.

On 1 April 2012, Croatian Foreign Minister Vesna Pusić attended the summit of the "Friends of Syria" in Istanbul. On 18 January 2013, Croatian Foreign Ministry declared that Croatia, as well as the entire European Union, recognizes the National Coalition for Syrian Revolutionary and Opposition Forces as the only "legitimate representatives of the aspirations of the Syrian people".

On 25 February 2013, it was confirmed that a large amount of weapons was sent to the rebels in Syria from Croatia and that the weapons were financed by Saudi Arabia. The cargo arrived in Jordan in December 2012. Nevertheless, Croatian Foreign Ministry and arms-export agency denied the involvement, while the Jordanian authorities refused to give any statement on the matter. On 28 February, Croatia's Prime Minister Milanović said that Croatia will withdraw its troops from the Golan Heights that are participating in the UN's peacekeeping mission because of the article published in The New York Times about the Croatia's involvement in aiding the rebels in Syria.

== State visits ==
On 21 December 2008, Croatia's president Stjepan Mesić visited Syria's president Bashar al-Assad in Damascus on Assad's invitation. The presidents discussed Croatian–Syria economic cooperation and the situation in the Middle East.

On 28 October 2009, Syria's President Bashar al-Assad visited Mesić in Zagreb. He announced that the purpose of his visit is to improve the relations between the countries. Mesić expressed his wishes for better economic cooperation between Croatia and Syria and said that Croatia's entry to the European Union would not be an obstacle to their relations. He also added that Croatia did not use all of its business opportunities in cooperation with Syria. The presidents discussed the situation at the Middle East as well. Assad is the first Syrian president to visit Croatia.

On 29 October 2009, Mesić suggested that Israeli and Syrian representatives should have a meeting at Croatian island of Brijuni. Mesić said that he has a close contact with Syrian president Bashar al-Assad and that he is holding frequent talks with him on improvement of the relationship between Croatia and Syria. He described Assad as serious" and "intelligent" leader and he supported return of the Golan Heights back to Syria. Mesić's proposal came after he met with Israeli prime minister Benjamin Netanyahu and president Shimon Peres a week before.

== See also ==
- Foreign relations of Croatia
- Foreign relations of Syria
- Yugoslavia and the Non-Aligned Movement
