= Bulgaria–Syria relations =

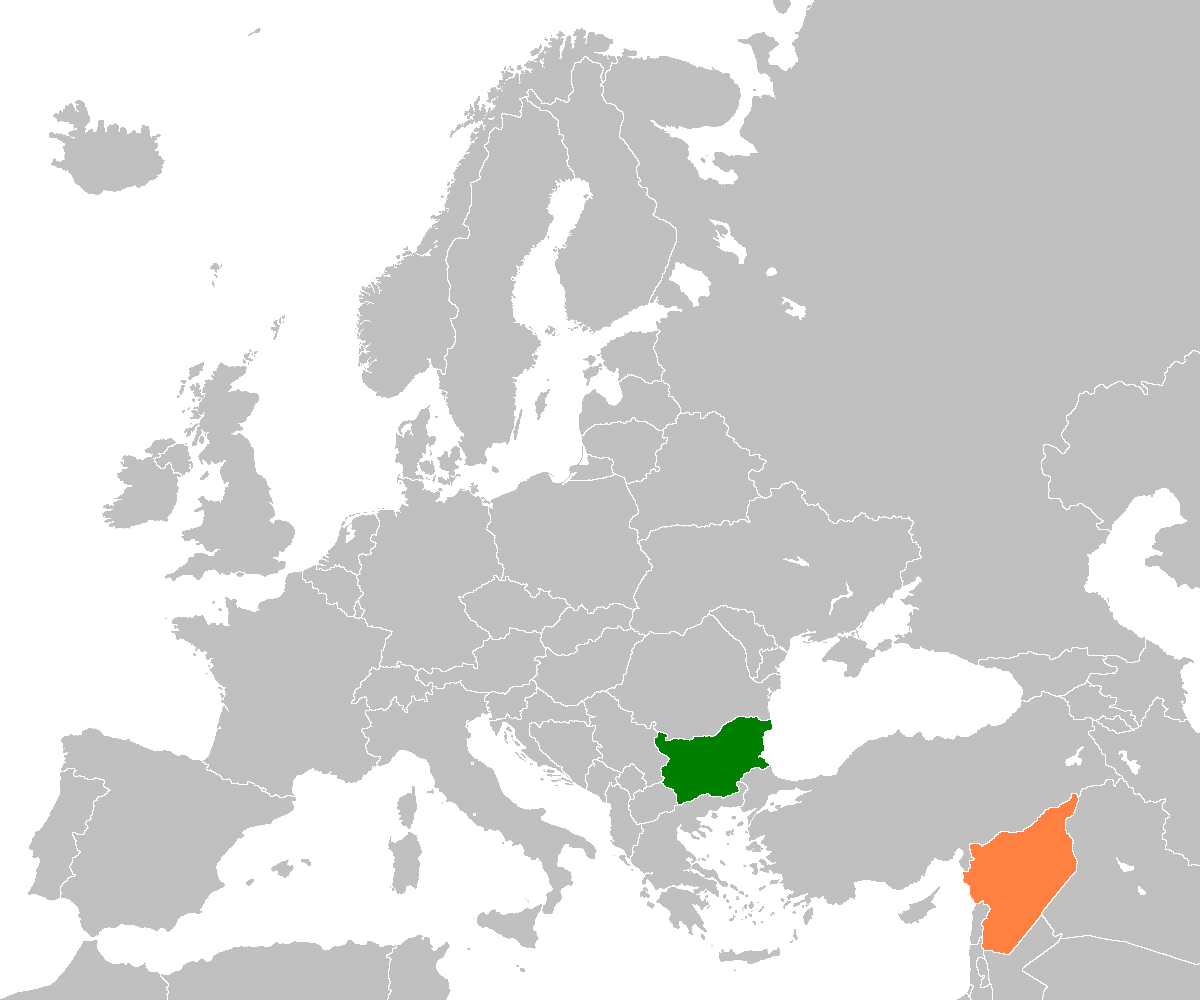

- Bulgaria: Syria

Bulgaria–Syria relations are the bilateral relations between Bulgaria and Syria. Both countries established diplomatic relations on August 24, 1954. Since May 1955, Bulgaria has embassy in Damascus and an honorary consulate in Aleppo. Syria has an embassy in Sofia.

Both countries are full members of the Union for the Mediterranean.

Bulgaria has been a regular participant in the annual Damascus International Fair and has returned to participating in 2017 after the fair was held again after a 5-year hiatus and in 2018. A permanent diplomatic mission and a chargé d'affaires have been appointed at the Bulgarian embassy in Damascus during the Syrian civil war.

== See also ==
- Foreign relations of Bulgaria
- Foreign relations of Syria
