= Morocco–Syria relations =

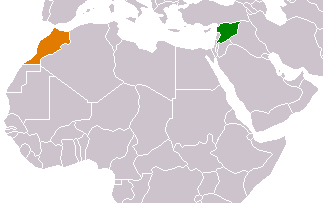
- Syria: Morocco

Morocco–Syria relations are the bilateral relations between Morocco and Syria. Both countries are members of the United Nations, the Arab League and the Organisation of Islamic Cooperation. Syria has an embassy in Rabat, while Morocco is represented in Syria through its embassy in Damascus.

Relations between the two countries have alternated between periods of cooperation and tension. They were affected by Cold War-era alignments, the Arab–Israeli conflict, the Western Sahara conflict, and the Syrian civil war. Following the fall of the Assad government, Morocco and Syria moved to restore full diplomatic relations.

== History ==
=== Early and modern relations ===
Both countries share historical, cultural and religious ties. Their territories were incorporated into the Roman Empire in antiquity and later came under Arab Muslim rule. In the centuries that followed, Morocco developed as an independent kingdom under successive local dynasties, while Syria became part of the Ottoman Empire from the 16th century until the early 20th century. Diplomatic relations were established in 1956.

During the second half of the 20th century, relations were shaped by regional political divisions. Syria was closely associated with pan-Arabism and later with the Ba'athist political order, while Morocco maintained closer ties with Western countries. These different orientations contributed to recurring tensions between the two states. In 1965, King Hassan II allegedly allowed Israeli intelligence services to record an Arab League meeting in Casablanca, an episode later described as having contributed to Israel’s intelligence advantage before the Six-Day War.

Relations improved during the 1973 Yom Kippur War, when Morocco sent troops to support Arab forces, including Syria. The improvement was limited, as the two countries continued to diverge on regional and diplomatic issues.

Ba'athist Syria supported the Polisario Front during the Western Sahara War, a position that strained relations with Morocco. Tensions deepened in 1986, when President Hafez al-Assad broke diplomatic relations with Morocco after Hassan II held a secret meeting with Israeli prime minister Shimon Peres.

=== Syrian Civil War ===
The outbreak of civil war in Syria once again strained relations, with Morocco supporting the Syrian opposition against the government of Syria and hosting a meeting of anti-Assad coalition members in 2012 and 2013. Morocco has attempted to distance from the conflict and endorsed a political solution instead of military intervention. The Syrian ambassador was expelled in 2012 in a move of protest by Morocco, while the Syrian government likewise accused Morocco of financing and helping the Free Syrian Army.

While Morocco maintains supportive of Syrian refugees, cases like Syrians trapped between Algerian–Moroccan border also gave concerns to Moroccan authorities.

In 2019, due to the changing tide in favor to Damascus, Morocco opted to secure a position that would accept Syria's return to Arab League; but tensions between both countries developed by historical mistrusts still play a role on hampering its development.

In 2023, Saudi Arabia and UAE led the initiative to restore Syria's participation in the Arab League, which was initially rejected by Morocco due to Syria's support for the Polisario.

Nevertheless, on 7 May 2023, following the decision of the Council of the Arab League to reactivate Syria's membership, foreign minister Nasser Bourita voiced Morocco’s support to the efforts made in this regard by Saudi Arabia. Bourita recalled the historical ties between Morocco and Syria and affirmed that King Mohammed VI follows closely the Syrian crisis and its impacts on countries of the region.

In June 2023, on the sidelines of the 13th conference of Arab ministers of education organized by the ALESCO, Minister of Education Dr. Darem Tabbaa met with his counterpart Chakib Benmoussa. It was the first meeting between a Syrian and Moroccan official since 2011.

=== Post-Assad period ===
Following the fall of the Assad regime in 2024 after a major rebel offensive, Morocco was among the first countries in the Maghreb to welcome the political change in Syria. The shift came after years of tense relations between Morocco and the Ba'athist government in Damascus.

During the 2025 Arab League summit in Baghdad, Moroccan Foreign Minister Nasser Bourita announced, on behalf of King Mohammed VI, that Morocco would reopen its embassy in Damascus, which had been closed since 2012. On 9 July 2025, the Moroccan embassy in Damascus was officially reopened.

In May 2026, the Syrian transitional government expressed support for Morocco's territorial integrity during a visit by Syrian Foreign Minister Asaad Hassan al-Shibani to Rabat, where he reopened Syria’s embassy in Morocco. In a joint statement, Syria welcomed United Nations Security Council Resolution 2797, which supports Morocco’s autonomy plan, describing it as a turning point toward a political solution to the dispute.

== Partner cities ==
- Damascus – Rabat (from 1986)

== See also ==
- Foreign relations of Syria
- Foreign relations of Morocco
