= Holy See–Syria relations =

Bilateral relations

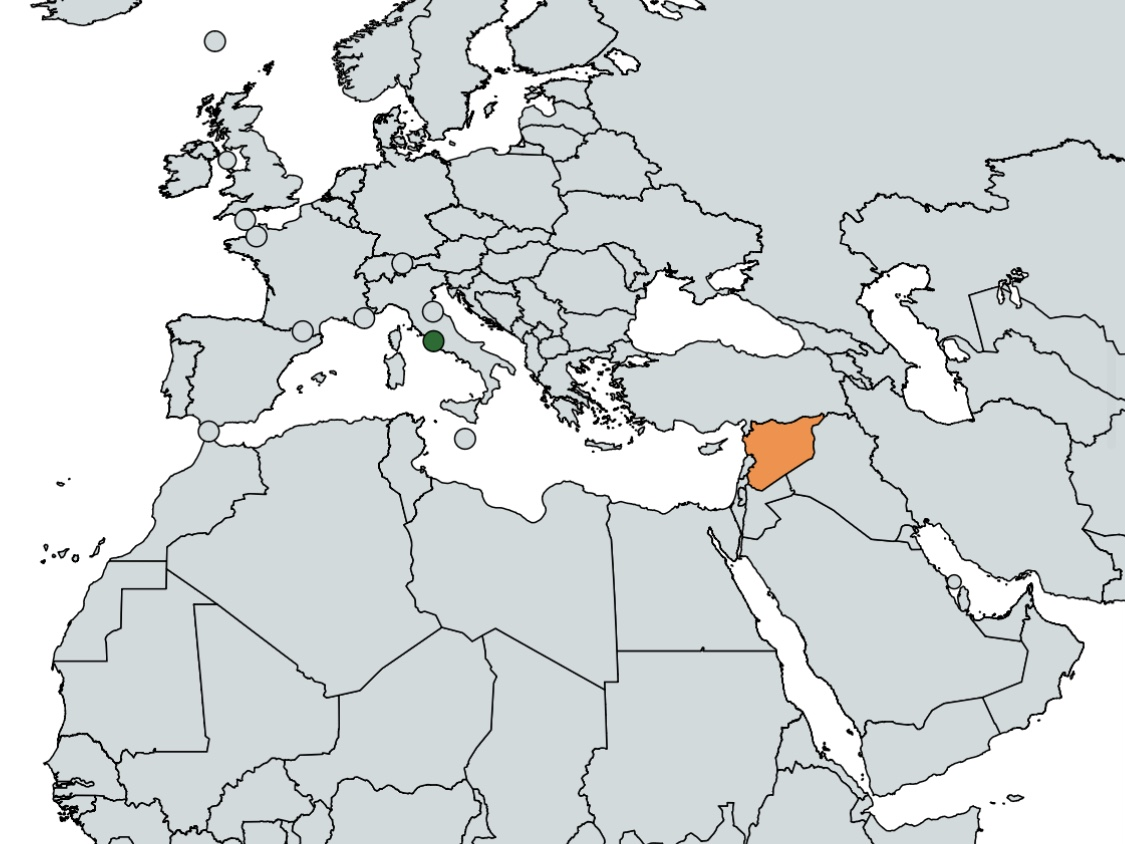
- Holy See: Syria

Holy See–Syria relations refer to the diplomatic and religious interactions between the Holy See, representing the Vatican City and the Roman Catholic Church, and Syria. The relations between the two countries are primarily shaped by historical religious ties, humanitarian concerns, and efforts for peace and stability in the region.

After Assad’s regime collapsed in December 2024, Pope Francis urged the Syrian rebels who ousted President Bashar al-Assad to restore peace in the country.

== Historical background ==
The relationship between the Holy See and Syria has roots in early Christian history. Syria is home to some of Christianity's significant ancient sites, including the city of Damascus, where, according to Christian tradition, Paul the Apostle experienced his conversion to Christianity. Over the centuries, the region has been an important center for Eastern Christian communities, such as the Syriac Orthodox Church and Melkite Greek Catholic Church, both of which maintain ties with the Vatican.

During the time Syria was under the Ottoman Empire, Catholic communities in Syria were governed under the millet system, allowing them some autonomy in religious affairs. The Vatican's formal diplomatic relations with modern Syria were established on 21 February 1953.

=== Interfaith dialogue ===
Syria has a diverse religious landscape, with significant Muslim and Christian populations. The Holy See has actively promoted interfaith dialogue in Syria as a means of fostering peaceful coexistence and mutual understanding. The Holy See’s position is that dialogue between different religious communities is essential for building peace in Syria and the broader region. This approach has been particularly important in light of the ongoing conflict, which has strained relations between various religious and ethnic groups.

== Diplomatic relations ==
The Holy See and Syria officially established diplomatic ties on 21 February 1953. The Vatican has a nunciature in Damascus, and Syria has maintained diplomatic representation to the Holy See through its embassy in Madrid since the closure of the one in Rome. Diplomatic relations have been maintained even during times of political upheaval and conflict in the region.

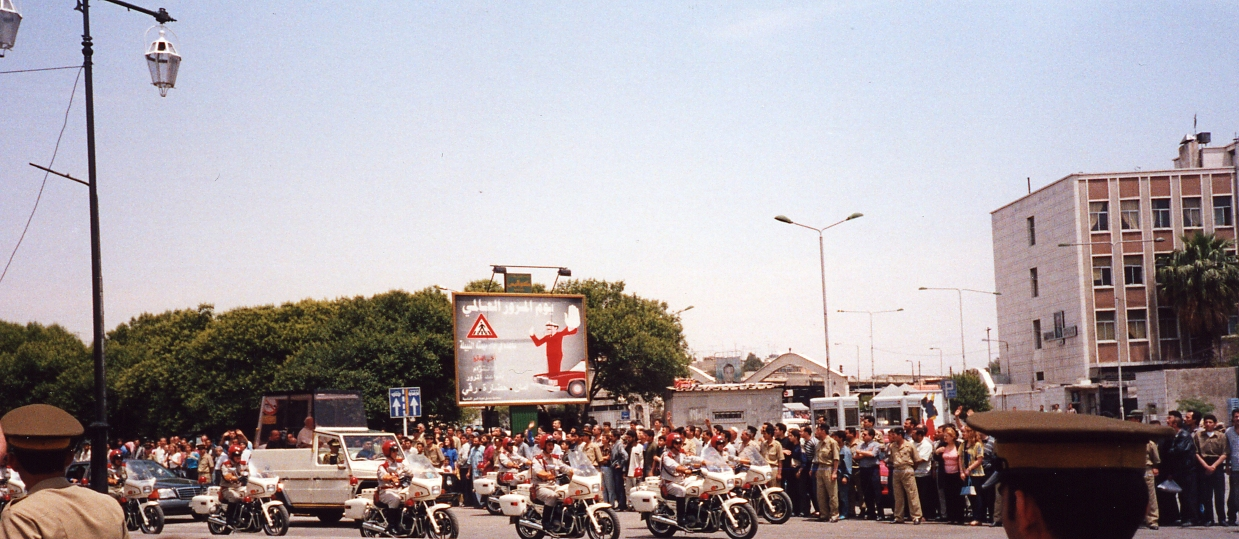
Pope John Paul II in Damascus in 2001

One of the key moments in the history of Holy See–Syria relations occurred in 2001, when Pope John Paul II made a historic visit to Syria. During his visit, he became the first pope to enter a mosque, visiting the Umayyad Mosque in Damascus, a gesture of interfaith respect and dialogue. The visit was seen as an effort to promote peace and reconciliation between Christians and Muslims.

=== Vatican's position on the Golan Heights ===
The Vatican has consistently advocated for a peaceful resolution to the Golan Heights dispute through dialogue and international law. During his 2001 visit to Quneitra, Pope John Paul II emphasized the need for forgiveness and reconciliation, urging that past conflicts not fuel further suffering.

== Relations during the Syrian Civil War ==
The Holy See has consistently called for peace, dialogue, and humanitarian aid for the millions of people affected by the conflict. Pope Benedict XVI and Pope Francis have both expressed deep concern over the situation in Syria, especially regarding the plight of Christians and other religious minorities in the region.

In 2013, Pope Francis held a global day of prayer and fasting for peace in Syria, which coincided with rising international tensions over the potential military intervention in the country. The Holy See has also worked through diplomatic channels to advocate for peaceful solutions and has provided significant humanitarian support for Syrian refugees and internally displaced persons.

=== Humanitarian efforts ===
The Vatican has played a key role in the humanitarian response to the Syrian crisis. Caritas Internationalis, the Catholic Church's charity arm, has been active in Syria, providing aid to those affected by the war, regardless of their religious affiliation. The Holy See has repeatedly urged the international community to prioritize humanitarian assistance and reconciliation efforts in Syria.

== Post-Assad regime relations ==
After the fall of the Assad regime in December 2024, Pope Francis appealed to the Syrian rebels who overthrew President Bashar al-Assad to bring stability to the nation and to lead with a spirit of unity.

After the death of Pope Francis in April 2025, President Ahmed al-Sharaa expressed his condolences, praising the Pope for standing with the Syrian people and speaking out against injustice. He said the pontiff’s compassion and moral courage would continue to inspire the nation.

In June 2025, Pope Leo XIV addressed the attack on Mar Elias Church in Damascus, Syria. He prayed for the victims, entrusting them to God’s mercy, and expressed his sympathy and prayers for the wounded and their families. On 11 January 2026, Leo XIV addressed the clashes in Aleppo between the Syrian transitional government and the Syrian Democratic Forces, saying that “persistent tensions are causing the deaths of many people,” and calling for peace and dialogue.

On 14 May 2026, a senior Syrian diplomatic source told The Media Line that preparations were underway for a possible meeting between al-Sharaa and Leo XIV.

== See also ==
- Foreign relations of the Holy See
- Foreign relations of Syria
- Apostolic Nunciature to Syria
- Christianity in Syria
  - Catholic Church in Syria
  - Syrian Popes
