= Syria–Venezuela relations =

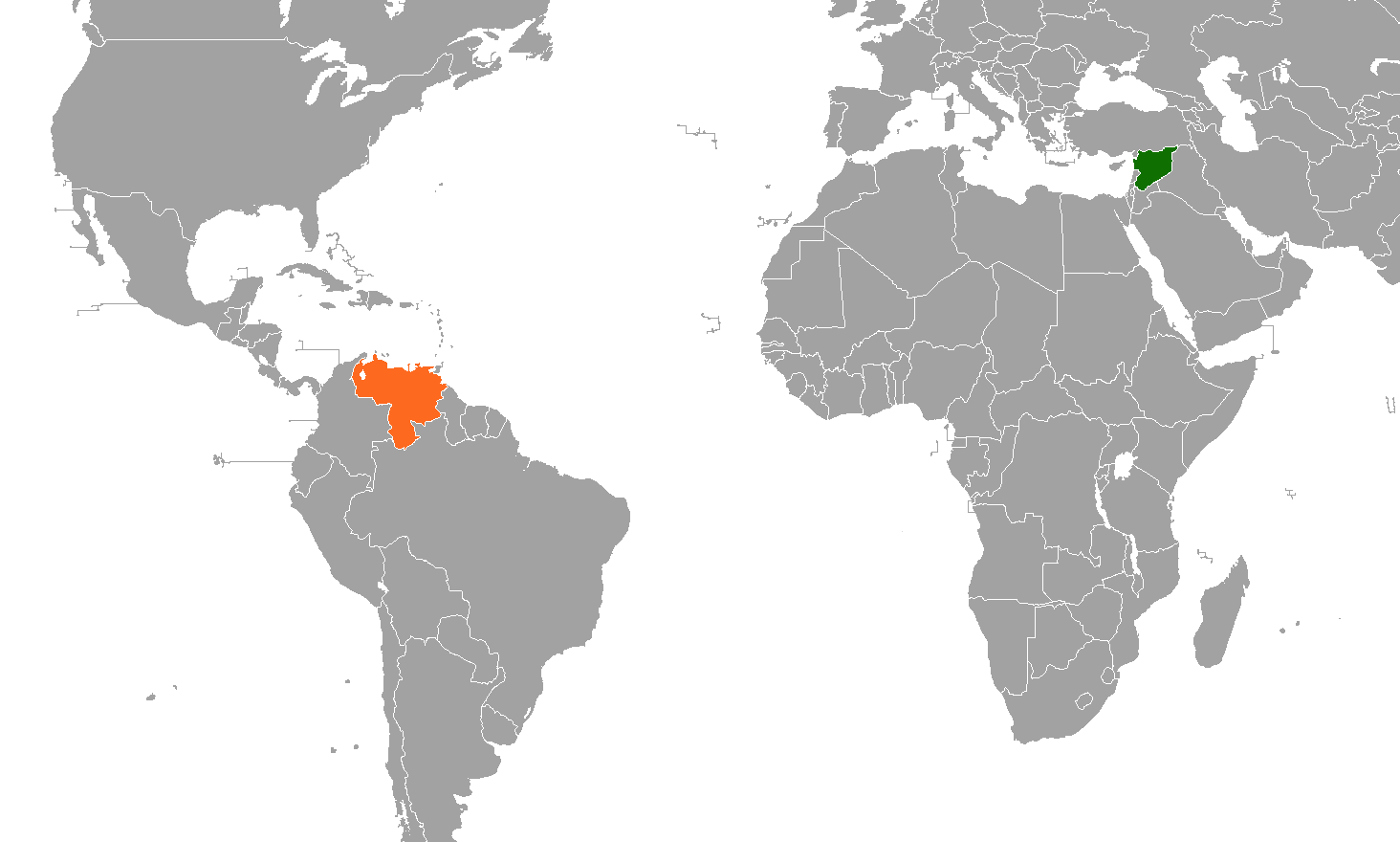
- Syria: Venezuela

Syria–Venezuela relations are bilateral relations between the Syrian Arab Republic and the Bolivarian Republic of Venezuela. Diplomatic relations were established on 17 June 1946. Syria has an embassy in Caracas and honorary consulate in Puerto La Cruz, Venezuela has an embassy in Damascus.

== History ==
Both countries have supported each other in the face of international pressure against their respective national policies. In August 2006, President Hugo Chávez of Venezuela made his first official visit to Syria to show his support for the country in the face of rising tensions with the United States. Chávez also made visits to Syria in September 2009 and October 2010, while Syrian president Bashar al-Assad met with Chávez in Venezuela in July 2010.

Venezuela continued to support the Ba'athist Syrian government throughout the Syrian civil war, first under Chávez and later under the leadership of Nicolás Maduro.

As of July 2012, Venezuela, despite the ongoing civil war and international sanctions, had supplied Syria with at minimum three big deliveries of diesel with another one likely underway. Venezuela defended the shipments by saying that if Syria wanted them Venezuela would give them if they could and that they were not able to decide foreign policy by fright of US sanctions as they made no difference to Venezuela.

In 2013, Maduro warned against potential US action in Syria while questioning if Assad's government really was to blame for the Ghouta chemical attack. Maduro also claimed that the US wanted to divide Syria into four parts because it symbolizes opposition to US "advance and imperialism" in the Middle East.

On 29 July 2019, Ba'athist Syria was one of the countries to sign a joint declaration in support of the Maduro government, as part of a letter addressed to UN Secretary General António Guterres in response to the Venezuelan presidential crisis.

On 3 December 2024, Venezuela condemned the offensive carried out by HTS calling them terrorists and backed Assad and his government. Maduro had also personally called Assad the day before to show support.

== See also ==
- Syrian Venezuelans
- Foreign relations of Syria
- Foreign relations of Venezuela
