= Switzerland–Syria relations =

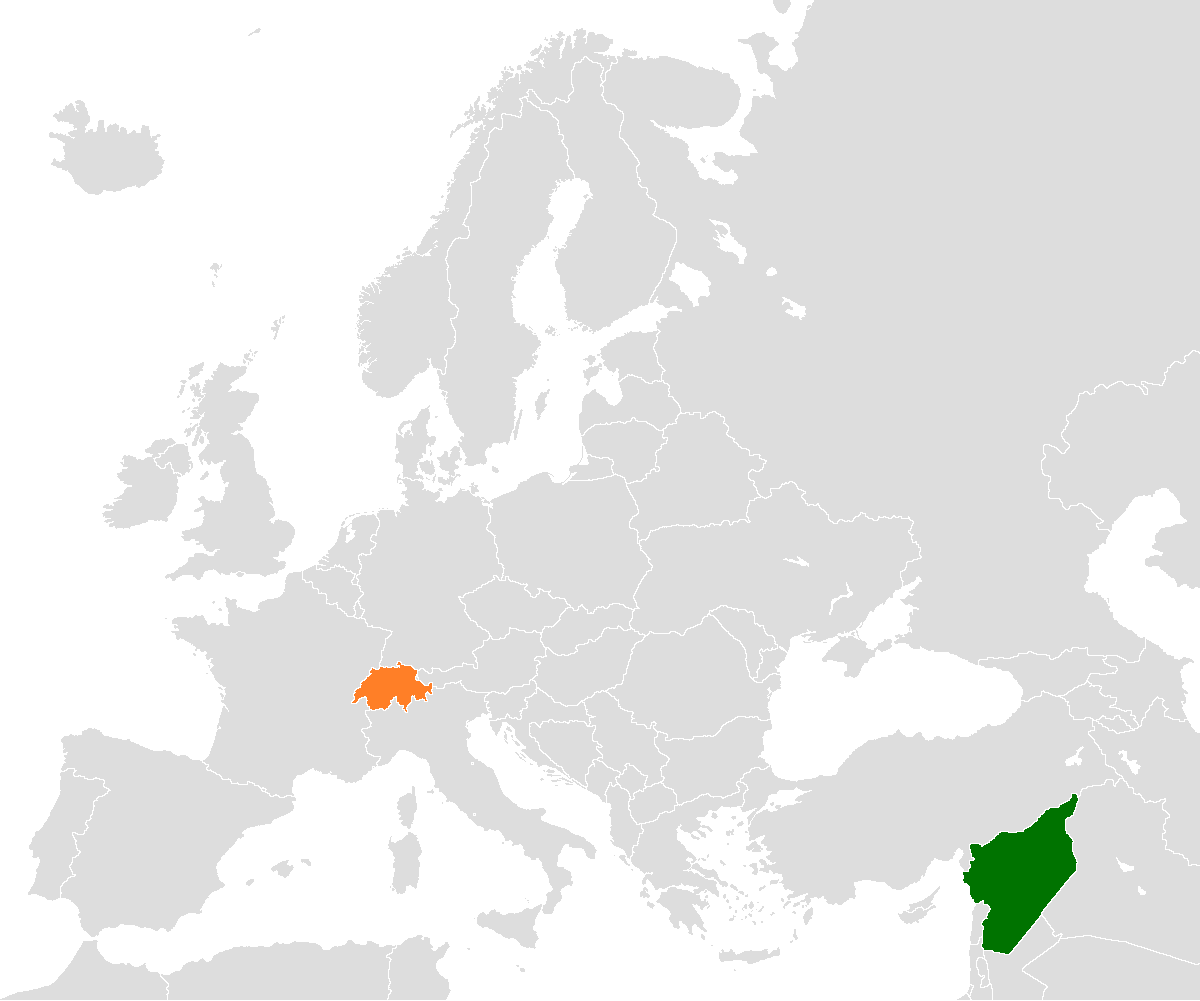
- Switzerland: Syria

Switzerland–Syria relations are the bilateral and diplomatic relations between these two countries. Syria had an embassy in Bern and has a Consulate-General in Geneva. Switzerland is accredited to Syria from its embassy in Beirut.

== History ==
In 1941, Syria became an independent country and was recognized by Switzerland four years later. From 1946 to 1958, Switzerland's diplomatic representation in Damascus consisted of a chancery, which was later replaced by a consulate general. Finally, in 1962, this was elevated to the status of a full embassy. In September 2005, the Swiss ambassador Jaques de Watteville described his country's relations with Syria as "very good relations."

On 18 August 2011, the Syrian ambassador to Bern was summoned for consultations against the backdrop of escalating violence. As a result of the Syrian conflict, the Swiss embassy was closed in 2012. On 8 March 2022, Foreign Minister Faisal Mekdad received the credentials of the non-resident Swiss chargé d'affaires. On 3 March 2023, the Swiss Federal Council announced the easing of sanctions on Syria.

After Bashar al-Assad's fall in December 2024, Switzerland suspended all asylum proceedings for Syrians. The Swiss federal government closely monitors the situation in Syria and called on all parties to work towards peace. Switzerland has a consular and humanitarian office in Damascus and considered restaffing its embassy there. The Swiss foreign ministry offered its diplomatic services for negotiations between different groups.

== See also ==
- Foreign relations of Syria
- Foreign relations of Switzerland
