= Libya–Syria relations =

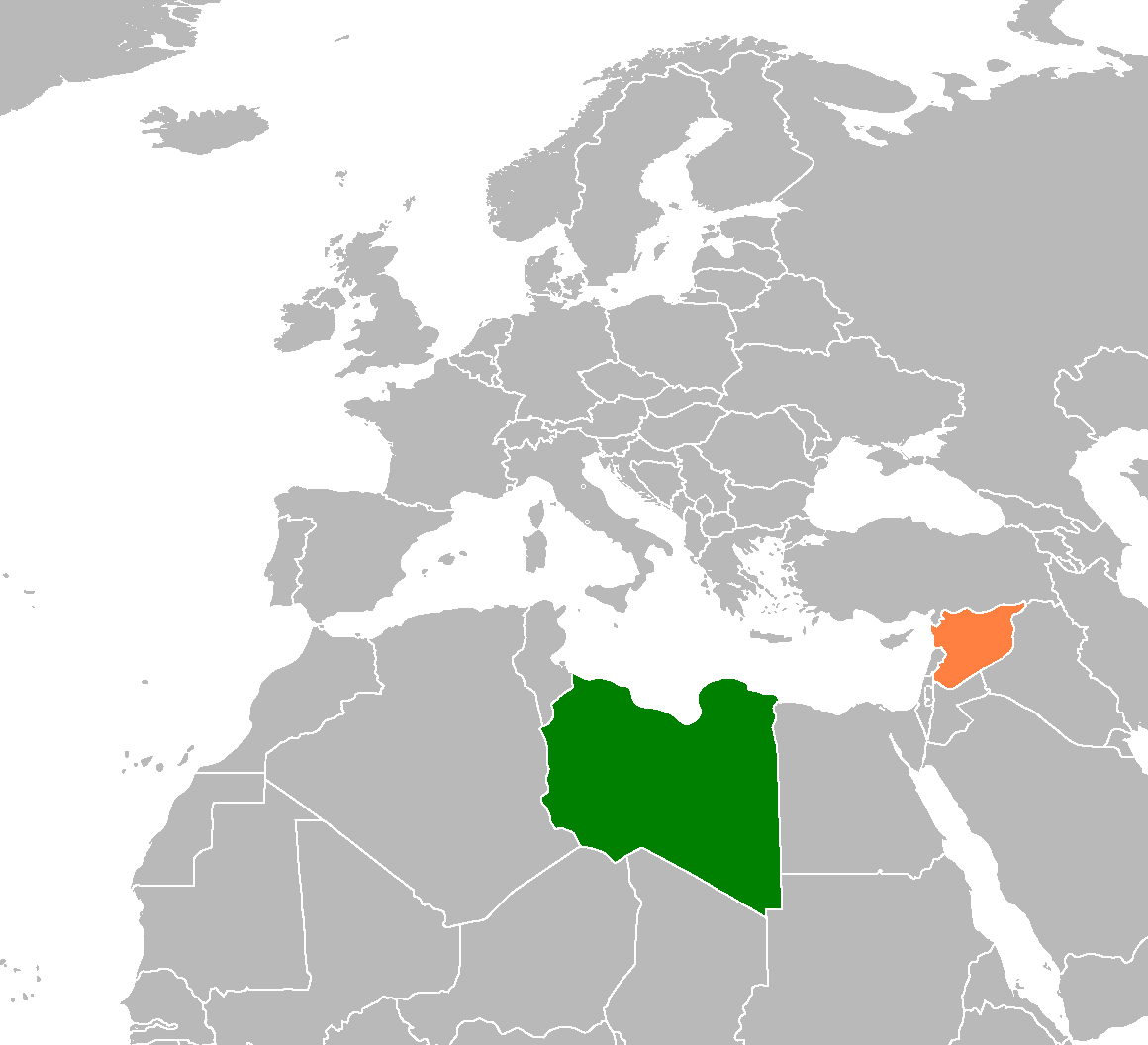

- Libya: Syria

Diplomatic mission
- Libyan embassy, Damascus: Syrian embassy, Tripoli

Libya–Syria relations are the bilateral relations between Libya and Syria. The two countries are members of the Arab League, OIC and the United Nations.

== History ==
Libya and Syria established diplomatic relations in 1963. Muammar Gaddafi visited Syria on November 16, 1970, just three days after the Corrective Movement, which brought Hafez al-Assad to power. In 1984, Gaddafi provided $200 million to vice-president Rifaat al-Assad and helped resolve the conflict between the two brothers, ensuring Hafez al-Assad's continued rule in Syria.

During the Syrian civil war, President Bashar al-Assad's response was often compared by protesters to Muammar Gaddafi's crackdown during the Libyan uprising in February 2011. On 16 September 2011, Syria voted at the United Nations General Assembly to accredit the National Transitional Council (NTC) as the representative of Libya. However, the Assad government permitted Al-Rai TV, a Syrian station, to broadcast pro-Gaddafi propaganda, including audio messages from Gaddafi, his family members, and former Information Minister Moussa Ibrahim.

On 10 October 2011, Libya became the first country to recognize the Syrian National Council (SNC), an opposition umbrella group, as "the sole legitimate government in Syria." NTC official Musa Al-Koni announced the recognition and stated that the Syrian Embassy in Tripoli would be closed until further notice. The NTC also promised to hand over control of the Syrian Embassy in Tripoli to SNC representatives.

On 1 March 2020, a Libyan delegation representing the Libyan House of Representatives visited Damascus to sign a memorandum of understanding (MoU) aimed at reactivating diplomatic missions between the two countries.

Following the fall of the Assad regime, Libyan Minister of State for Communication and Political Affairs Walid Ellafi visited Damascus on 28 December 2024 to meet Ahmed al-Sharaa, the de facto leader of Syria. On 5 January 2025, 34 tons of Libyan humanitarian aid arrived at Damascus Airport to support the Syrian people. The Syrian embassy in Tripoli was reopened on 20 August 2025.

== Resident diplomatic missions ==
- Libya has an embassy in Damascus.
- Syria has an embassy in Tripoli.
