= Qatar–Syria relations =

- Qatar: Syria

Qatar–Syria relations are the bilateral relations between Qatar and Syria. Qatar closed its Damascus embassy in 2011 until December 2024. The Qatari government recognized National Coalition of Syrian Revolutionary and Opposition Forces and gave it the Syrian embassy in Doha. The relationship between both countries has changed significantly over the past few years, largely as a result of the civil war in Syria.

== History of relations ==
Both countries established diplomatic ties on 19 January 1972. In 1995, Syrian President Hafez al-Assad sided with Saudi Arabia against Qatari Emir Hamad bin Khalifa Al Thani when he deposed his father Khalifa bin Hamad Al Thani in a bloodless coup. Later on, Bashar al-Assad visited Doha in 2003, which initiated a new chapter of economic, trading and investment relations. In May 2010, Syrian President Bashar al-Assad and Emir of Qatar Sheikh Hamad bin Khalifa Al Thani expressed support for Turkish-led efforts to bring about a diplomatic resolution to the dispute over Iran's nuclear program.

Before the beginning of the Syrian conflict, Qatar and Syria had a fairly positive relationship and maintained diplomatic connections. Since 2005, the two countries had regular visits from top officials and their trade and investment relations were strengthening. Qatar has made investments in multiple areas in Syria, such as the real estate, financial and tourism sectors.

=== Syrian Civil War ===
In 2011, as the Syrian civil war began, Qatar, like other regional actors, joined in backing opposition factions aiming to overthrow the government of the Syrian President Bashar al-Assad. Qatar primarily aimed to strengthen MB's influence in the region and advance its own interests by offering support to the Syrian opposition. Qatar offered financial and military support to different rebel factions, comprising both secular and Islamist organizations such as the Syrian Muslim Brotherhood, through the NGOs like the Sheikh Eid bin Mohammad Al Thani Charitable Association, Qatar Charity or Alkarama.

Qatar and Turkey formed a single bloc in the Syrian conflict and supported the same rebel groups, including internationally designated terrorist groups, such as Tahrir al-Sham Islamist alliance, jihadist umbrella group Syrian Islamic Front, Islamic Front, Jaysh al-Islam, Ahrar al-Sham and Al-Qaeda-affiliated Nusra Front. One prominent militant group funded by both Turkey and Qatar is the pro-Islamist Syrian National Council. According to reports both countries provided weaponry, munitions, and additional financial support to the militant groups, such as the Free Syrian Army, Syrian National Army, Army of Conquest and has transformed the Syrian embassy in Doha into an operations room for adversaries of Syria. Both were also involved in the CIA–led Timber Sycamore covert operation to train and arm Syrian rebels. Moreover, Qatar had a noteworthy involvement in training and instructing rebel fighters through the "MOM" (Müşterek Operasyon Merkezi) command center in Turkey. Qatar has been the biggest sponsor of Syrian rebel forces during the war.

In April 2023, the Qatar Fund for Development (QFFD), in cooperation with the Turkish Presidency of Disaster and Emergency Management (AFAD), announced plans to build a city in northern Syria, which would house 70,000 displaced Syrians, following the 2023 Turkey–Syria earthquake. In June 2023, Qatar pledged to donate $75 million for humanitarian needs to Syria.

In May 2023, the Syrian government returned to the Arab League. Despite Qatar's refusal and the statement of its foreign minister that the reasons for suspending Syria's membership still exist, Doha did not formally object to the return of Damascus.

In August 2023, Qatar Charity rehabilitated the Bablit Water Station in northern Syria, enhancing water access and employment opportunities in the region.

=== Post-Assad regime relations ===
During the 2024 fall of the Assad regime in Syria led by Hay'at Tahrir al-Sham (HTS), Qatar re-iterated its support for the country's rebels and its opposition to Assad. It was later reported that Qatar would send humanitarian aid via the Turkish city of Gaziantep.

Later on, the state of Qatar decided to reopen its embassy on 17 December 2024. A week later, Mohammed al-Khulaifi, Qatar's Minister of State for Foreign Affairs, met with Syria's de facto leader Ahmed al-Sharaa, in Damascus, marking the first Qatari flight to the Syrian capital since the collapse of the Assad regime. Syrian foreign minister Asaad al-Shaibani visited Qatar on 4 January 2025. Later that month, on 30 January, Emir Tamim bin Hamad Al Thani became the first head of state to visit Damascus following the regime change, discussing among other things post-conflict reconstruction in Syria.

On 8 May 2025 several sources claimed the US have agreed that Qatar will financially support Syria's public sector and pay their salaries.

== See also ==
- Foreign relations of Qatar
- Foreign relations of Syria
- Syria–Turkey relations
- Qatar–Saudi Arabia diplomatic conflict
