= Serbia–Syria relations =

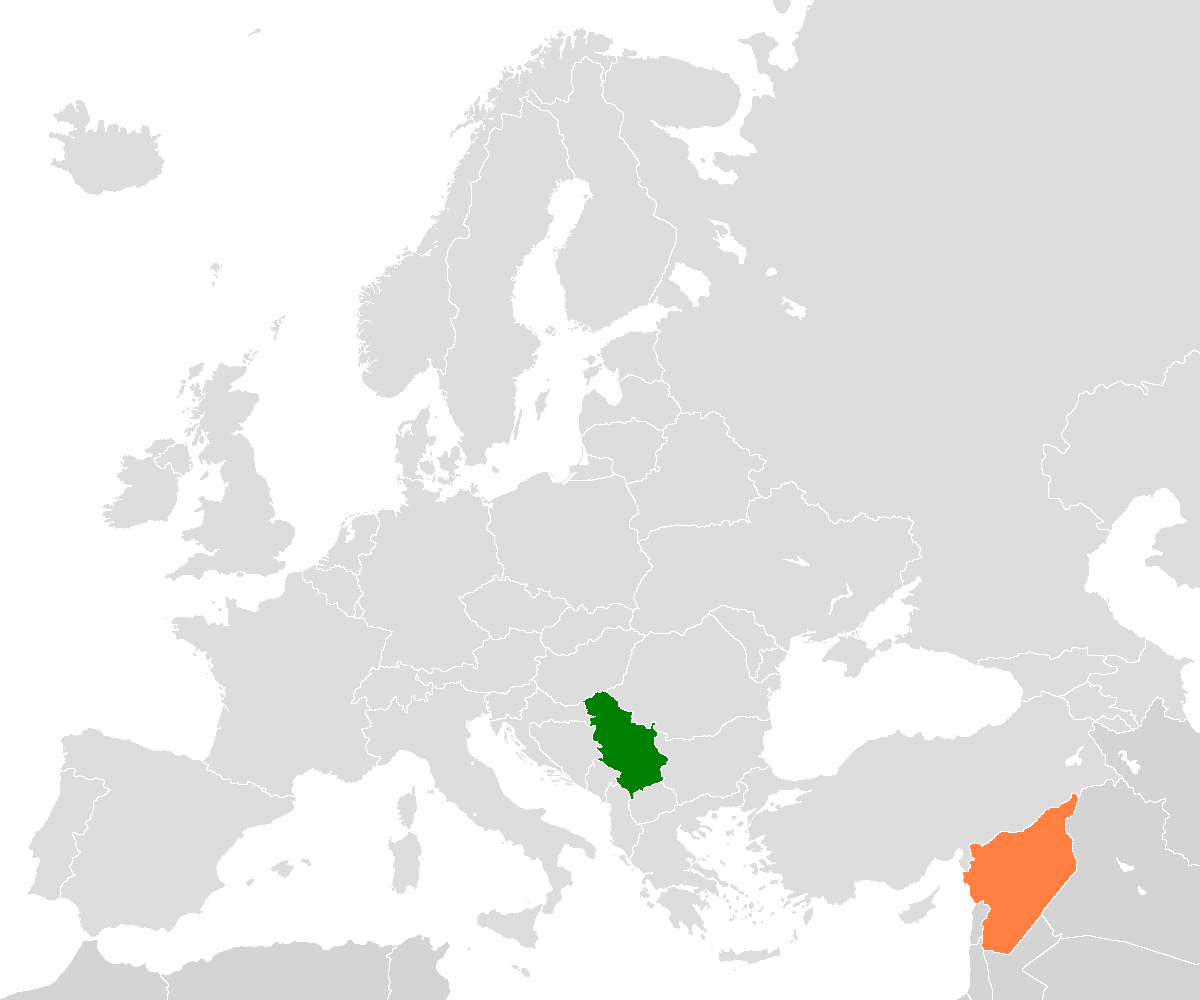
- Serbia: Syria

Serbia and Syria maintain diplomatic relations established between Syria and SFR Yugoslavia in 1946. From 1946 to 2006, Syria maintained relations with the Socialist Federal Republic of Yugoslavia (SFRY) and the Federal Republic of Yugoslavia (FRY) (later Serbia and Montenegro), of which Serbia is considered shared (SFRY) or sole (FRY) legal successor.

== History ==
Diplomatic relations with Syria were established in 1946.

In 2008, Ba'athist Syria did not recognize Kosovo's unilateral declaration of independence. Serbian Minister of Foreign Affairs Vuk Jeremić visited the Syrian Arab Republic in 2009 and met with Walid Muallem. On 13 May 2009, Syria's ambassador to Serbia, Majed Shadoud, reported that then Syrian president Bashar al-Assad told Serbian Foreign Minister Vuk Jeremić that his country continued to oppose the recognition of the independence of Kosovo. Shadoud quoted al-Assad as saying "Syria urges a political solution for the situation in the Balkans and the Middle East and is opposed to any kind of divisions in both regions, regardless of whether religious, ethnic or nationalist reasons are in question". Ba'athist Syria voted against Kosovo's admission to UNESCO in 2015.

On 29 October 2025, Syria recognised the independence of Kosovo.

During 2015 European migrant crisis a majority of Syrian refugees and migrants transited through Serbia en route to the Western European countries (primarily Germany).

== Resident diplomatic missions ==
- Serbia has an embassy in Damascus.
- Syria has an embassy in Belgrade.

== See also ==
- Foreign relations of Serbia
- Foreign relations of Syria
- Yugoslavia and the Non-Aligned Movement
