= Arabs in Austria =

Arabs in Austria Araber in Österreich
Regions with significant populations
- Vienna

Languages
- Arabic • Austrian German

Religion
- Islam • Christianity

Related ethnic groups
- Arab people, Arab diaspora, Arab American, Arab Argentine, Arab Brazilian, Arab Canadians, Arab Mexican

Arabs in Austria (Arabic: عرب النمسا) are Austrians of Arab ethnic, primarily Egyptians, Lebanon, Syrians, Palestinian, Iraq and to a smaller extent Algeria, Tunisia, Morocco, and Yemen who emigrated from their native nations and currently reside in Austria. Most Arab Austrians are of Levantine, Iraqi and Egyptian origin, as a result of the fact that they were the first Arabs to arrive in Austria.

In addition, Austria has people from Arab countries, who have the status of refugees (Refugees of the Syrian civil war) or illegal immigrants (Algerians of mainly Berber descent and usually mistakenly called Arabs) trying to immigrate to Western Europe.

== Notable people ==
- Kerim Frei, footballer born to Turkish father and Moroccan mother
- Adnan Ibrahim, theologian and Muslim preacher of Palestinian origin
- Abdel Sattar Sabry, footballer of Egyptian origin
- Tarafa Baghajati, activist and writer of Syrian origin
- Omar Hamdi, artist of Syrian-Kurdish origin
- Alisar Ailabouni, fashion and model
- Fadi Merza, kickboxing and Muay Thai champion of Syrian origin
- Nadja Maleh, actress, singer, cabaret artist and director of Syrian and Austrian origin

== See also ==
- Arab diaspora
- Arabs in Europe
- Arabs in Germany
- Arabs in Switzerland
- Syrians in Austria
- Immigration to Austria
- Lebanese diaspora
- Syrian diaspora
- Palestinian diaspora
- Moroccan diaspora
- Iraqi diaspora
- Egyptian diaspora
- Tunisian diaspora
