= Syrians in Austria =

السوريون في النمسا

Total population
- 95,180 (2024)

Regions with significant populations
- Vienna

Languages
- Arabic, Turkish, Kurdish, German

Religion
- Islam (mainly Sunni Islam, minority Alawites), Christianity, Druze, Atheism

Related ethnic groups
- Other Arabs in Austria, Syrian diaspora

Syrians in Austria (Arabic: السوريون في النمسا) include migrants from Syria to Austria, as well as their descendants. The number of Syrians in Austria is estimated at 95,000 people as of January 2024, and it consists mainly of refugees of the Syrian Civil War.

== Migration history ==
During the European migrant crisis of 2014–2015 hundreds of thousands of Syrian refugees of the Syrian Civil War entered Austria to seek refugee status. The European migrant crisis was especially accelerated when on 4 September 2015, Chancellor Werner Faymann of Austria, in conjunction with Chancellor Angela Merkel of Germany, announced that migrants would be allowed to cross the border from Hungary into Austria and onward to Germany, and early on 5 September 2015, buses with migrants began crossing the Austro-Hungarian border. In june 2026, 2,000 syrians return to home voluntarially.

== Notable people ==
- Tarafa Baghajati, activist and writer of Syrian origin
- Omar Hamdi, artist of Syrian-Kurdish origin
- Alisar Ailabouni, fashion and model
- Fadi Merza, kickboxing and Muay Thai of Syrian origin
- Nadja Maleh, Austrian actress, singer, cabaret artist and director.

== See also ==
- Austria–Syria relations
- Arabs in Austria
- Kurds in Austria
- Turks in Austria
- Immigration to Austria
- Islam in Austria
- Syrian diaspora
