= Arabs in Switzerland =

Arabs in Switzerland العرب في سويسرا Araber in der Schweiz Arabes en Suisse Gli arabi in Svizzera
Total population
- 50.000-60.000

Regions with significant populations
- Geneva, Lausanne, Zurich, Bern, Freiburg, Basel, Winterthur, Luzern, Neuchâtel, St. Gallen

Languages
- Arabic, Swiss German, Swiss French, Swiss Italian

Religion
- Islam and Christianity but also Druze and irreligion, among others

Related ethnic groups
- Arabs, Arab diaspora, Arabs in Europe

Arabs in Switzerland (Arabic: عرب سويسرا) are Swiss citizens or residents of Arab ethnic, cultural or linguistic heritage from Arab countries, particularly North Africa, Levant, and Iraq, also small groups from Palestine, Yemen, and Sudan, who emigrated from their native nations and currently reside in Switzerland.

== History ==
In the 10th century, Arabs from their Mediterranean Fraxinet base settled in the Valais for a few decades. They occupied the Great St. Bernard Pass and even managed to reach as far as St. Gallen to the north and Raetia in the east.

The influx of Arab immigrants from various Arab countries since the early years of the twentieth century, most Arabs came to study, work or residence in Switzerland.

== Demographics ==
Swiss people of Arab origin (predominantly from Maghreb but also some from Mashreq areas of the Arab world) in Switzerland. There are no official figures concerning the demographics of Swiss people of Arab descent.

=== Maghreb ===
The number of nearly 18,000 people by the end of the first decade became nationals of Arab Maghreb countries, make up 1% of the total foreign population in Switzerland. However, the presence and impact of this demographic in the public arena Swiss far greater than the actual number, according to a scientific study done by a comprehensive forum for Immigration Studies at the University of Neuchatel, commissioned by the State Secretariat for Migration, Switzerland.

By the end of 2010, Switzerland was hosting on its territory, especially in the big cities and in the French-speaking cantons, nearly all 18,000 permanent resident of the three Arab Maghreb countries distributed as follows: Morocco (7469), Tunisia (6418), Algeria (5822). The following chart shows the evolution of the number of permanent residents of the Maghrebis in Switzerland, according to their countries of origin in the period between 1981 and 2010.

Maghrebis are stationed in the Romandy. 64% of Algerians, 67% of Moroccans and 56% of Tunisians living in the French-speaking cantons, more than half of Moroccans and Algerians divided between the Canton of Geneva and Canton of Vaud, but this phenomenon is less severe for Tunisians where we find about 30% of them in the German-speaking cantons, especially in major cities.

The core index, which is used in Switzerland to distinguish between immigrant groups is the type of residence permit: There is a permanent residence (statement of class B and C), and temporary or seasonal residence (of class G, F, N and S). the report indicates that migrants Moroccans, Tunisians and Algerians have witnessed remarkable transformation since 1994, from temporary accommodation to permanent residency, after allowing for specific legal immigrants to apply for Swiss citizenship. For example, in 2009, 90% of Moroccans and Tunisians immigrants holders of residence permits of class B and C, while it was 70% for the Algerians in 2000. The largest group of residents of North African origin are from Morocco.

year	1980	1990	2000	2009
North Africa	6,205	10,905	15,469	20,415

=== Mashriq ===
In March 2012, the United Nations Office of the High Commissioner for Human Rights made a request to Switzerland to accept some Syrian refugees, and the Swiss government announced that it was considering the request. In March 2015, the Swiss Federal Council set a goal of accepting 3,000 Syrian refugees over three years. By September 2015, 5,000 Syrian refugees had received provisional permission to live in Switzerland, and an additional 2,000 had submitted asylum applications and were pending.

According to the Joshua Project there are 16,000 from Lebanon living in Switzerland.

According to the Iraqi community in Switzerland there are 5,159 from Iraq. Obtaining permits from the category (C) (to establish an unlimited term): 2.533 Obtaining permits from the category (B) (to establish long-term): 2.625 The number of Iraqis residing in a non-permanent (until the end of October 2013): Obtaining permits from the class (L) (to establish short-term): 4 Number of Iraqi refugees 2.143 (situation at the end of the month of November 2013): Holders of temporary residence of the category (N) (especially asylum seekers): 379. Obtaining permits from the class (F) (temporary residence on humanitarian grounds): 1.764

According to official statistics there are 7,185 Iraqis in 2013.

Nation	1980	1985	1990	1995	2000	2005	2010	2013
Iraq	352	378	454	771	2,046	3,257	7,553	7,185

== Culture ==
=== Religion ===
Mosque Al-Shems in Rebstein

The majority of Arabs are Muslims, according to the Association Culturelle des Femmes Musulmanes de Suisse A.C.F.M.S Arab community which has about 30,000 people represents only 18% of the entire Muslim community. There are also Arab Christians from Arab countries, particularly Lebanon and Syria, and other faiths, such as the Druze.

=== Language ===
Arabs in Switzerland speaks Arabic as a mother tongue. The four national languages of Switzerland are German, French, Italian and Romansh. Thus the Arabs speak the language which is official in the cantons of Switzerland.

== Notable people ==
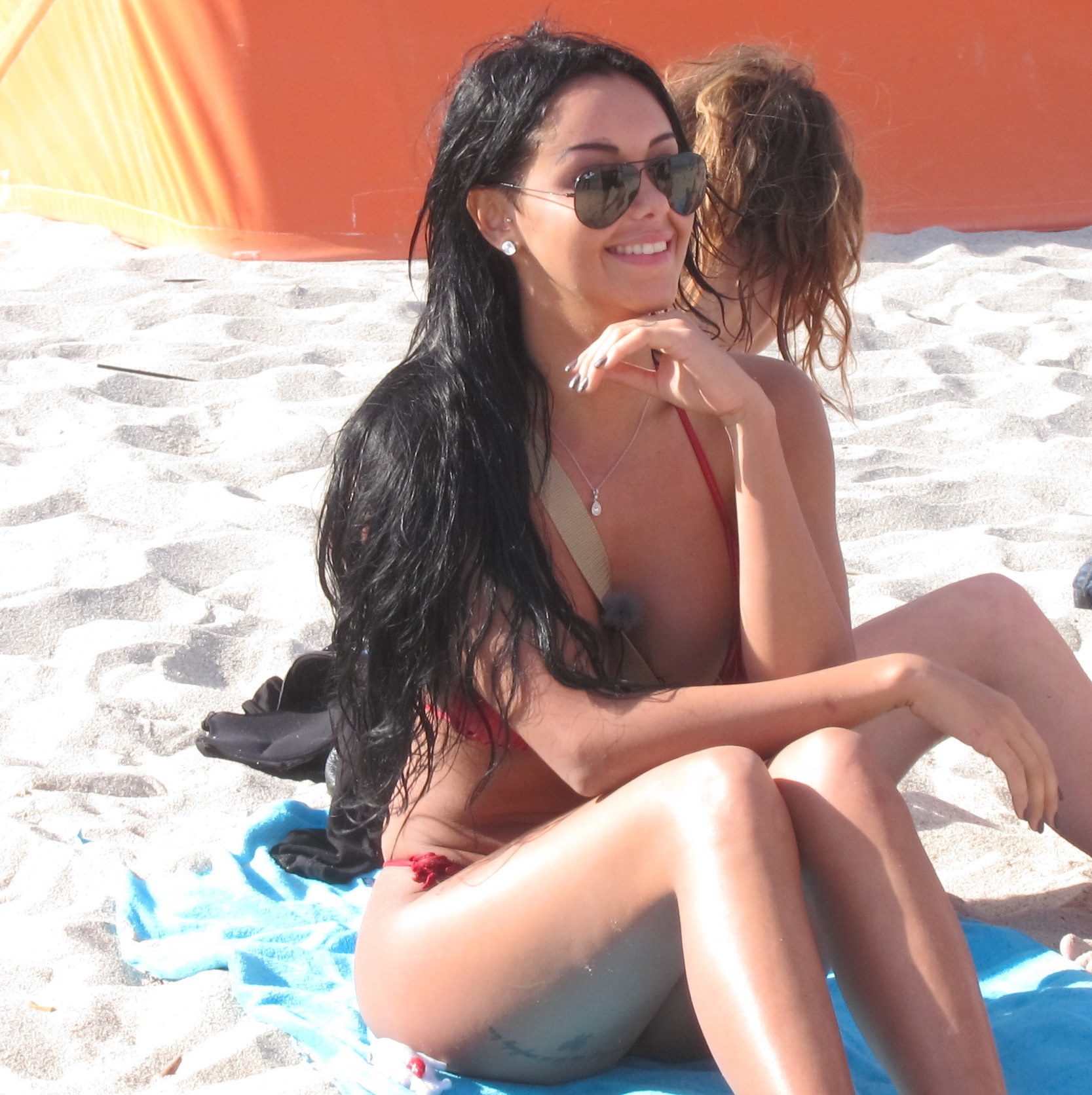
Nabilla Benattia

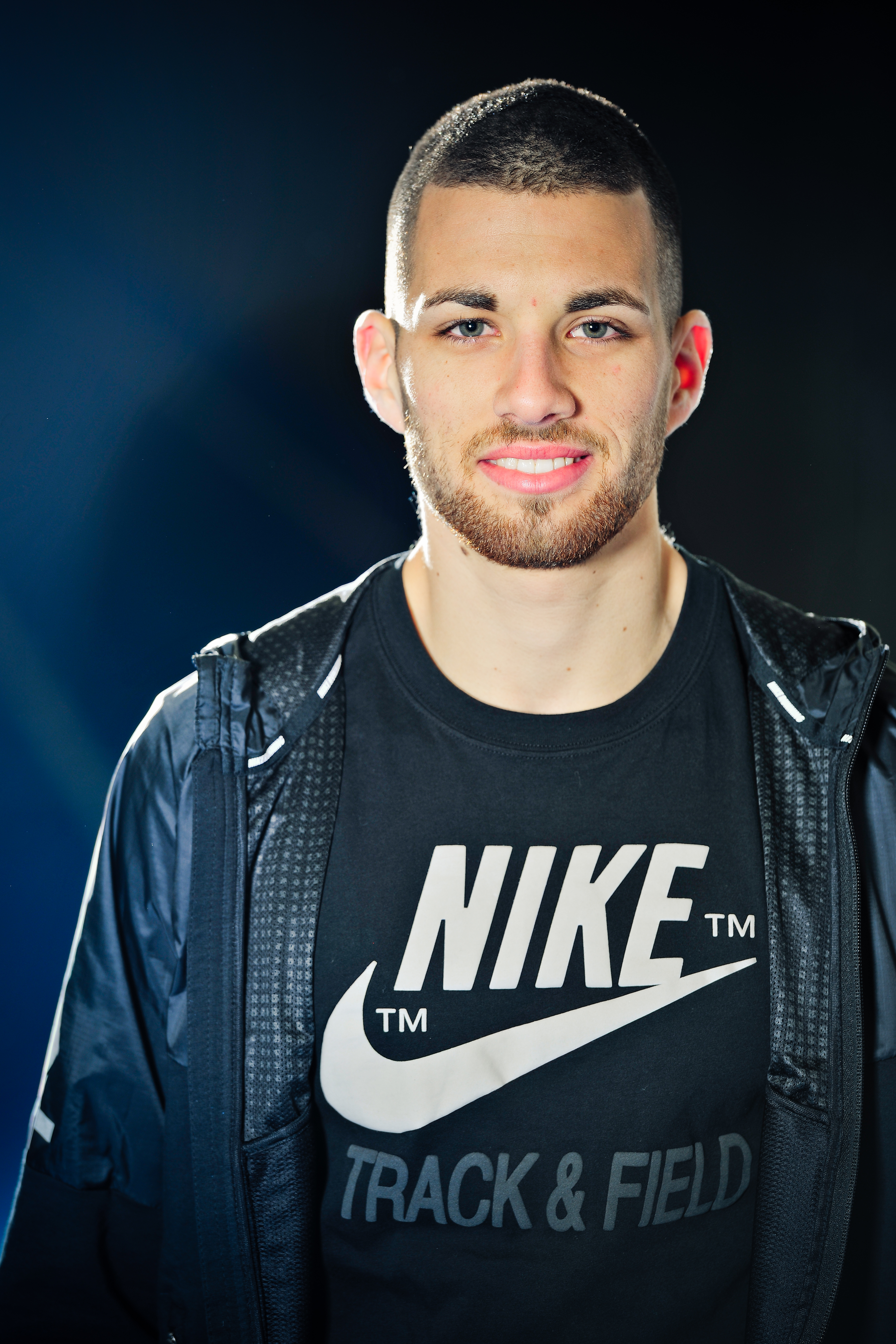
Kariem Hussein

- Cédric El-Idrissi, athlete of Moroccan origin.
- Djamel Mesbah, footballer of Algerian origin.
- Hassan Naim, biochemist of Lebanese origin.
- Hussein Naim, biochemist and molecular virologist of Lebanese origin.
- Hani Ramadan, Imam of Egyptian origin.
- Ismael Tajouri-Shradi, footballer of Libyan origin.
- Kariem Hussein, athlete of Egyptian origin.
- Kerim Frei, footballer of Moroccan origin.
- Karim Rossi, footballer of Moroccan origin.
- Kaled Gourmi, footballer of Algerian origin.
- Kamel Larbi, footballer of Algerian origin.
- Meriame Terchoun, footballer of Algerian origin.
- Mohamed Al-Fayed, business magnate of Egyptian origin.
- Mourad Dhina, physicist and activist of Algerian origin.
- Nassim Ben Khalifa, footballer of Tunisian origin.
- Nessim Gaon, financier of Sudanese origin.
- Nicolas Hayek, entrepreneur, co-founder, CEO and Chairman of the Board of the Swatch Group of Lebanese origin.
- Nabilla Benattia, model and a personality on French reality TV of Algerian origin.
- Philippe Jabre, the founder and CIO of Jabre Capital Partners S.A of Lebanese origin.
- Salim Khelifi, footballer of Tunisian origin.
- Samir Brikho, businessman (was Chief Executive of Amec Foster Wheeler of Lebanese origin.
- Sarah Atcho, sprinter of Moroccan origin.
- Sarah Lahbati, actress and reality show of Moroccan origin.
- Tariq Ramadan, academic, philosopher and writer of Egyptian origin.
- Yassin Mikari, footballer of Tunisian origin.
- Zeki Amdouni, footballer of Tunisian origin.

== See also ==
- Immigration to Switzerland
- Arab diaspora
- Arabs in Europe
- Arabs in Austria
- Arabs in France
- Arabs in Germany
- Arabs in Italy
