= Felix Marquardt =

French author, consultant, entrepreneur, producer and strategic advisor

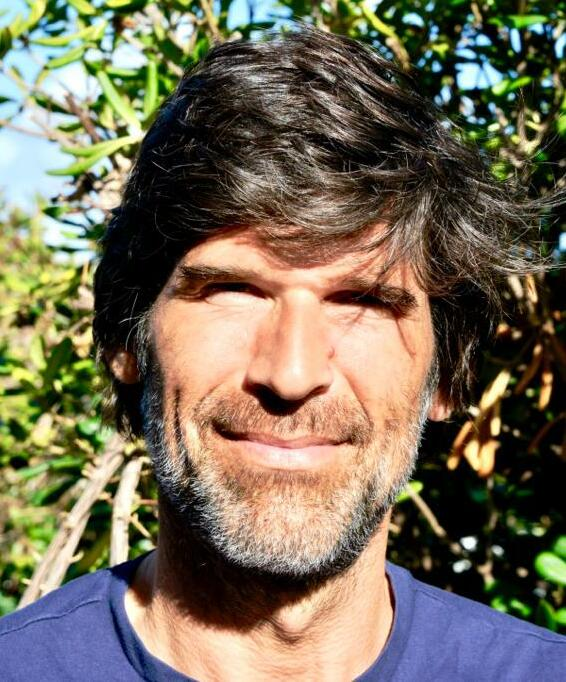
Marquardt in 2021

Felix Marquardt (born 1975) is a French writer and columnist, ex-communications consultant, entrepreneur, French rap producer, speechwriter and strategic advisor.

== Early life ==
Marquardt was born and raised in Paris, the son of a German-Austrian lawyer and an American art gallerist. An unruly student, Marquardt was kicked out of several schools, including the Collège Stanislas, École Alsacienne, Institut Charlemagne in Paris, and Northfield Mount Hermon in Massachusetts. He studied history and philosophy at Syracuse University, then transferred to Columbia University before dropping out in his senior year.

Raised loosely Catholic, he converted to Islam in Tunisia in 2003.

== Career ==
In 1998, Marquardt set up a rap label, Kohiba Productions, which eventually doubled as the Search Engine Optimization company Kohiba Multimedia. Between 2002 and 2004, he worked as a speechwriter for the CEOs of Vivendi Universal Publishing and L’Oréal. In 2004, he joined the International Herald Tribune as head of communications.

In 2009, Marquardt founded the public relations firm Marquardt & Marquardt with his brother Max, and launched the Atlantic Dinners, a series of events aiming to facilitate networking between foreign dignitaries and CEOs and the French elite. In 2013, he broadened the concept with the Emerging Times Dinners, hosted at the World Economic Forum in Davos, connecting North and South.

In 2012, Marquardt launched the Barrez-vous! movement, encouraging French youths to travel the world. In 2013, he co- founded Europeans Now, a pan-European liberal movement, with Daniel Cohn-Bendit, the head of the Green Party in the European Parliament. In 2015, he founded the think tank Youthonomics, which issued the Youthonomics Global Index, a ranking of countries according to youth-friendliness.

In the wake of the attacks on Charlie Hebdo, he started the Al Kawakibi foundation, a reformist Islamic think tank, with the former vice Premier of Malaysia Anwar Ibrahim, the mufti of Tripoli in Lebanon, and the Viennese imam Adnan Ibrahim.

In 2020, he cofounded Black Elephant, an intellectual movement aimed at using the pandemic to shed light on the intrinsic nature of the violence, unsustainability and complexity modernity is predicated upon and to start new conversations, notably on our addiction to growth.

His first book, The New Nomads: How the Migration Revolution is Making the World a Better Place was published in 2021.
