= Carla Amina Baghajati =

Austrian media officer

Carla Amina Baghajati (born Carla Siebrasse; 29 June 1966) is the media officer of the Islamic Faith Association in Austria and co-founder of the "Initiative muslimischer ÖsterreicherInnen" (loosely, "Initiative of Austrian Moslem men and women"). She has been described as one of the best-known faces of Islam in Austria. She was actually born in what was West Germany, but moved to Vienna as a student in 1987 and stayed.

== Life ==
Carla Siebrasse was born in Mainz-Mombach in West Germany (as it was known art that time). She grew up in an interdenominational Christian family. Her father was Protestant and her mother Catholic: her own upbringing was as a Protestant. She attended school locally, passing her "Abitur" (school final exam) as a pupil at the "Frauenlob-Gymnasium" (Catholic secondary school) in Mainz in 1985. (Note: The "Frauenlob-Gymnasium" had been an all-girls school till 1978, when it became co-educational.) In 1987 she moved to Vienna to study, completing a training in stagecraft at the (subsequently renamed) Vienna Conservatory, where she was taught by Elfriede Ott. She then embarked on a course in Comparative literature, Arabistics and History.

As a child she read the compilation of Middle Eastern folk tales known as One Thousand and One Nights and became "fascinated by Islam". In 1989, with Salman Rushdie's Satanic Verses grabbing the headlines after Ayatollah Khomeini pronounced a fatwa against the author and his publishers, Siebrasse found herself driven by curiosity to a book shop in order to find out what all the fuss was about. Next to The Satanic Verses on the shelf in the shop was a translation of the Koran. Instead of the novel she had been intending to buy, she purchased the religious text. She read it in a week, later telling an interviewer that she found in it "many answers to her life-questions". She also found it "one of the most beautiful works of literature [she] had ever read". She still had not completed her degree course, and it appears unlikely that will. Later that year, however, she converted to Islam, taking as her new middle name Amina, in celebration of the mother of the Islamic prophet Muhammad. In 1990 she married Tarafa Baghajati, a civil engineer, writer and anti-racism activist originally from Syria, who has lived in Vienna since 1986. The Baghajatis have four children.

== Works ==
Between 1991 and 1994 Baghajati involved herself in theatre and leisure projects with Muslim children and young people. She then focused between 1995 and 1998 on setting up a Muslim kindergarten in Vienna, which emerged as the city's first bilingual German-Arabic kindergarten. She also began to become increasingly engaged in projects dedicated to the integration and assimilation of recent immigrants.

In 1999 Baghajati teamed up with her husband to co-found the "Initiative muslimischer ÖsterreicherInnen" (loosely, "Initiative of Austrian Moslem men and women"). Other founder members included the SPÖ politician, Omar Al-Rawi and two leading officials of the Austrian Islamic Faith Association, Mouddar Khouja and Andrea Saleh. Key objectives were media work and inter-faith dialogue: initiatives in which the group took part that captured press attention included, starting in 2013, nationwide "Open Mosque days". She is a board member of the "Christians and Muslims Platform" inter-faith association. (Note: Christen und Muslime * Pegida dient dem Hass, nicht dem Frieden * Ein gutes Wort statt Hass, Ausgrenzung und Pauschalverdacht * Plattform "Christen und Muslime" gegen Verunglimpfung ihres Co-Vorsitzenden Dipl. Ing. Tarafa Baghajati) In the context of her involvement with Vienna's Moslem religious community more broadly she was, in addition, appointed to the newly created post of media officer with the Austrian Islamic Faith Association (IGGÖ) by the then president of the IGGÖ, Anas Schakfeh.

May 2015 saw the publiocation of Baghajati's book, "Muslimin sein – 25 Fragen, 25 Orientierungen". The book deals with topics such as public worship, role models, living together, marriage and family, along with perceptions of honour.

== Recognition ==
In 2008 Baghajati received the Federal Honor Decoration ("Bundes-Ehrenzeichen") from the Minister for Education, in recognition of her unpaid engagement in inter-cultural dialogue.
