= Al-Iman Mosque (Syria) =

Mosque in Damascus, Syria

- جامع الإيمان
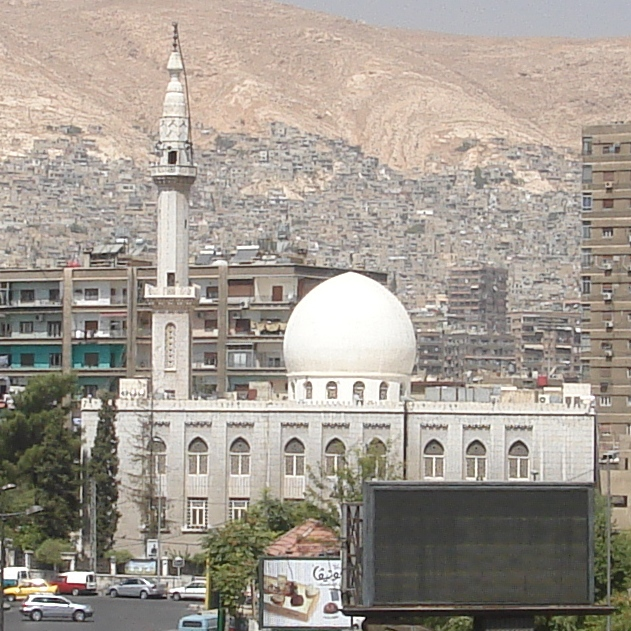
- The mosque in 2010

- Location of the mosque in Damascus

Religion
- Affiliation: Islam
- Ecclesiastical or organizational status: Mosque
- Status: Active

Location
- Location: Damascus
- Country: Syria
- Interactive map of Al-Iman Mosque
- Coordinates: 33°31′22″N 36°18′10″E

Architecture
- Type: Islamic architecture

Specifications
- Dome: 1
- Minaret: 1

The Al-Iman Mosque (Arabic: جامع الإيمان) is a mosque in the Mazraa district of Damascus, Syria.

On March 21, 2013, a suicide bomber killed at least 42 people and injured at least 84 others in the mosque. Amongst the killed was the prominent scholar, Mohamed Said Ramadan Al-Bouti. The mosque was not destroyed in the attack.

== See also ==
- Islam in Syria
- List of mosques in Syria
