= Collège Notre-Dame de Jamhour =

Catholic school in Lebanon

- Arabic: مدرسة سيدة الجمهور

Location
- Jamhour, Baabda District, Mount Lebanon Governorate; Lebanon
- Coordinates: 33°49′58″N 35°33′50″E

Information
- Type: Private primary and secondary school
- Motto: Latin: Ad maiorem Dei gloriam (For the greater glory of God)
- Religious affiliation: Catholic (Jesuit)
- Established: 1850; 176 years ago
- Rector: P. Marek Cieslik, S.J.
- Grades: K-12
- Language: French
- Colours: Blue, orange, white and gold
- Nickname: Notre-Dame; Jamhour
- Affiliation: Collège Saint-Grégoire
- Website: www.ndj.edu.lb

Collège Notre-Dame de Jamhour (Arabic: مدرسة سيدة الجمهور) often known colloquially as Jamhour, is a private, Catholic, co-educational, primary and secondary school, located in Jamhour, in the Baabda District of the Mount Lebanon Governorate, Lebanon. It was founded by the Society of Jesus in 1850.

The school enrolls students from the pre-primary level — specifically, "Douzième" or "Grande Section" (equivalent to U.S. Kindergarten) up to "Terminale" (equivalent to U.S. 12th grade).

As an institution homologated by the French Ministry of National Education, it offers a double curriculum preparing students for the French baccalaureate (bac) and the official Lebanese baccalaureate. It is widely regarded as Lebanon's best Francophone school and is noted for its high academic standards. Arabic and English are also taught from early elementary years. Spanish and Italian are optional languages for the French baccalaureate and are proposed in high school years.

Collège Saint-Grégoire (CSG), located in Achrafieh, Beirut, is an affiliated establishment to Jamhour that offers classes from "petit section" (pre-primary) to "Troisième" (equivalent to U.S. 9th Grade). CSG students continue their last three high school years at the main campus of Jamhour in Baabda, specifically to le Grand Collège.

Teachers adhere to rigorous pedagogical methodologies and continuously pursue professional development at the "Centre de Formation et de Resources Pédagogiques" (CFRP). As a result, the school typically reports a 100% pass rate with high honors on the French bac.

Alumni are consistently accepted into top local universities, including the American University of Beirut (AUB), Université Saint-Joseph (USJ), and Lebanese American University (LAU), as well as prestigious foreign institutions such as those in the Ivy League, the British Golden triangle, and the French Grandes écoles.

== History ==
The Jesuit College Seminar of Ghazir founded in 1844 relocated to Beirut and founded Saint Joseph University of Beirut (1875). In turn, the secondary school of this university will become known as Collège Notre-Dame de Jamhour.

Before the late 1950s, the campus was located at Rue Huvelin in Beirut. On Sunday, April 30, 1950 (the 75th anniversary of the founding of Saint Joseph University) was laid the first stone of the current Baabda campus on the hill of Jamhour. To this day, both Jesuit institutions maintain close ties.

== Campus ==
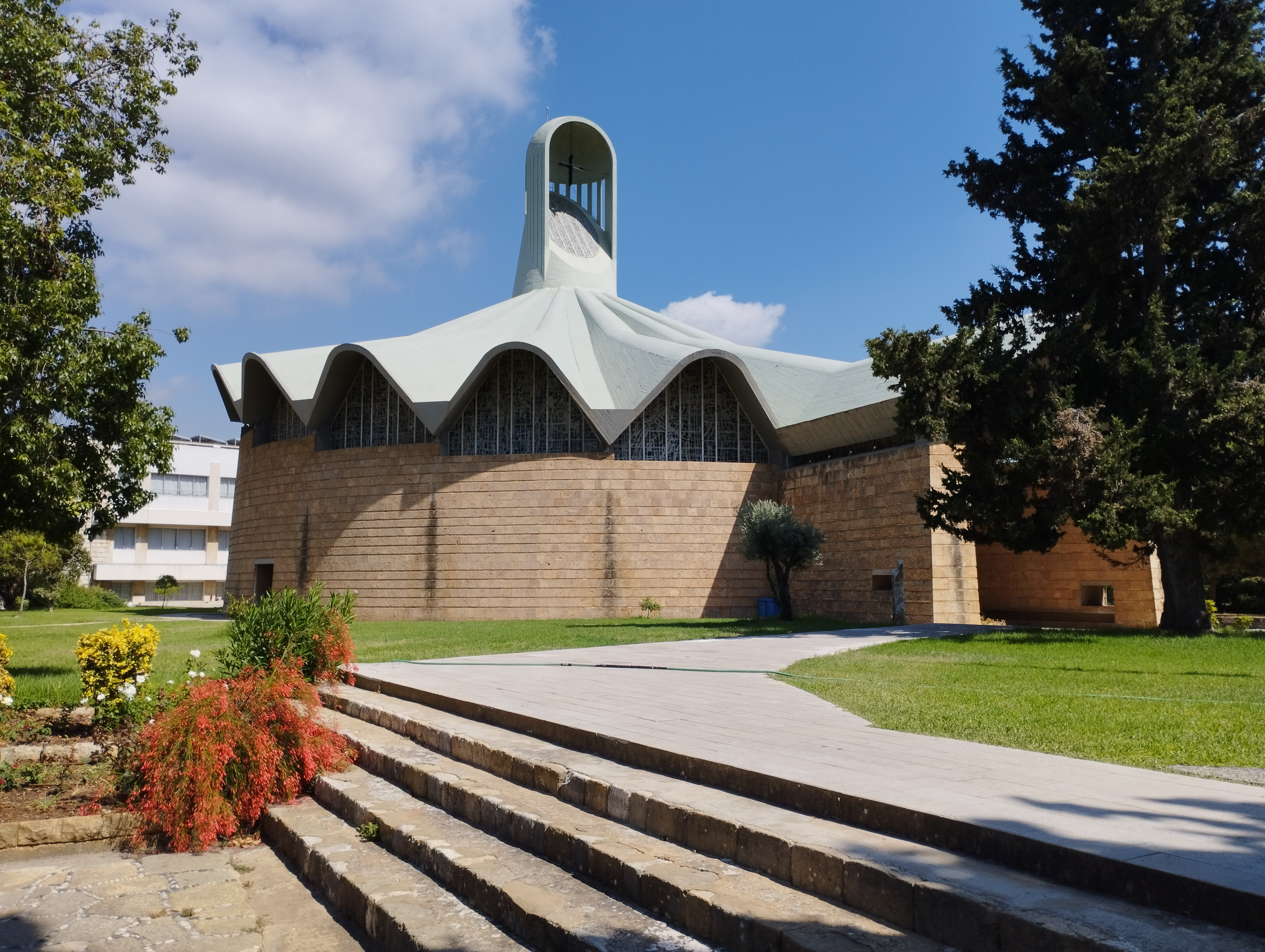
The large church of Collège Notre-Dame de Jamhour

Jamhour campus stretches over spacious grounds and forests. It is divided into three distinct sections: "le Petit Collège", which houses the lower grades; "le Grand Collège", which serves the higher grades; and "le Centre Sportif, Culturel et Social" (CSCS). The CSCS is a sport complex that includes a fully-equipped gymnasium, an Olympic-size swimming pool, tennis courts, an Omnisport court and an Olympic Stadium suited for large events.

Libraries and computer labs are at the disposal of students during recesses. Laboratories which are equipped with a wide range of tools, electronic devices, laboratory glassware and chemicals are utilized for practical sessions under the close supervision of teachers.

The large church Notre Dame de Jamhour overlook the hill of Jamhour.

== Dual Curriculum and Bac Specializations ==
In line with the French and Lebanese curriculums, the following disciplines are extensively taught: natural sciences (mathematics, biology, physics, chemistry, and geology), social sciences (history, geography, economics, and sociology), philosophy and the arts (drawing, singing and theater) are taught in French. Loyal to its Catholic motto, Catechesis is regularly taught in Arabic. Computer skills and several software, notably MS Excel and MS PowerPoint are taught and used at each grade. Algorithms and Python programming language are taught within Mathematics hours. Physical education courses are given weekly.

The CSCS provides suitable courts and facilities to learn and practice: athletics, badminton, basketball, football, futsal, gymnastics, handball, martial arts, squash, swimming, table tennis, tennis, volleyball, water polo and more. Each age bracket has a team that represents Jamhour in the seasonal interschool competitions. Jamhour is known to be among the major contenders in local competitions. Students and alumni can be selected by Lebanon national teams.

Notre-Dame offers all the specialization programs (series) of the French and Lebanese baccalaureate in the Secondary such as Mathematics (SG), Physics, Chemistry, Biology (SV), History/Geography/Political Science (HGGSP), English Literature (LLC), Extended Philosophy (HLP), and Economy and social science (SES). Common courses for all include History/Geography, Philosophy, Scientific lessons, PE, Computer Science, and Religion.

MS Teams is the communication software used to deliver remote courses in case of lockdowns. It was extensively used during the COVID lockdown.

== Criticisms ==
Concerns have been raised regarding adequate student surveillance, specifically due to the low supervisor-to-student ratio and the vast outdoor fields where students (+1,000) take their breaks. The limited staff number supervising vast fields during recess hours is a systemic concern for student safety. Physical violence, aggressive rhetoric and bullying among students do occur. Jamhour rules have zero-tolerance to bullies and proper sanctions on turbulent elements are in place. Previous incidents were strongly condemned by the Rector. However, the reluctance by victims to report aggressions due to social pressure (reporting aggression is frowned upon by other students) and intimidation significantly delays appropriate measures. Young victims are left with psychological scars and in extreme cases post-traumatic stress disorder. Lebanese schools suffer from a prevalence of violence among students. Lawmakers are pushing to criminalize bullying with new draft law.

== Notable alumni ==
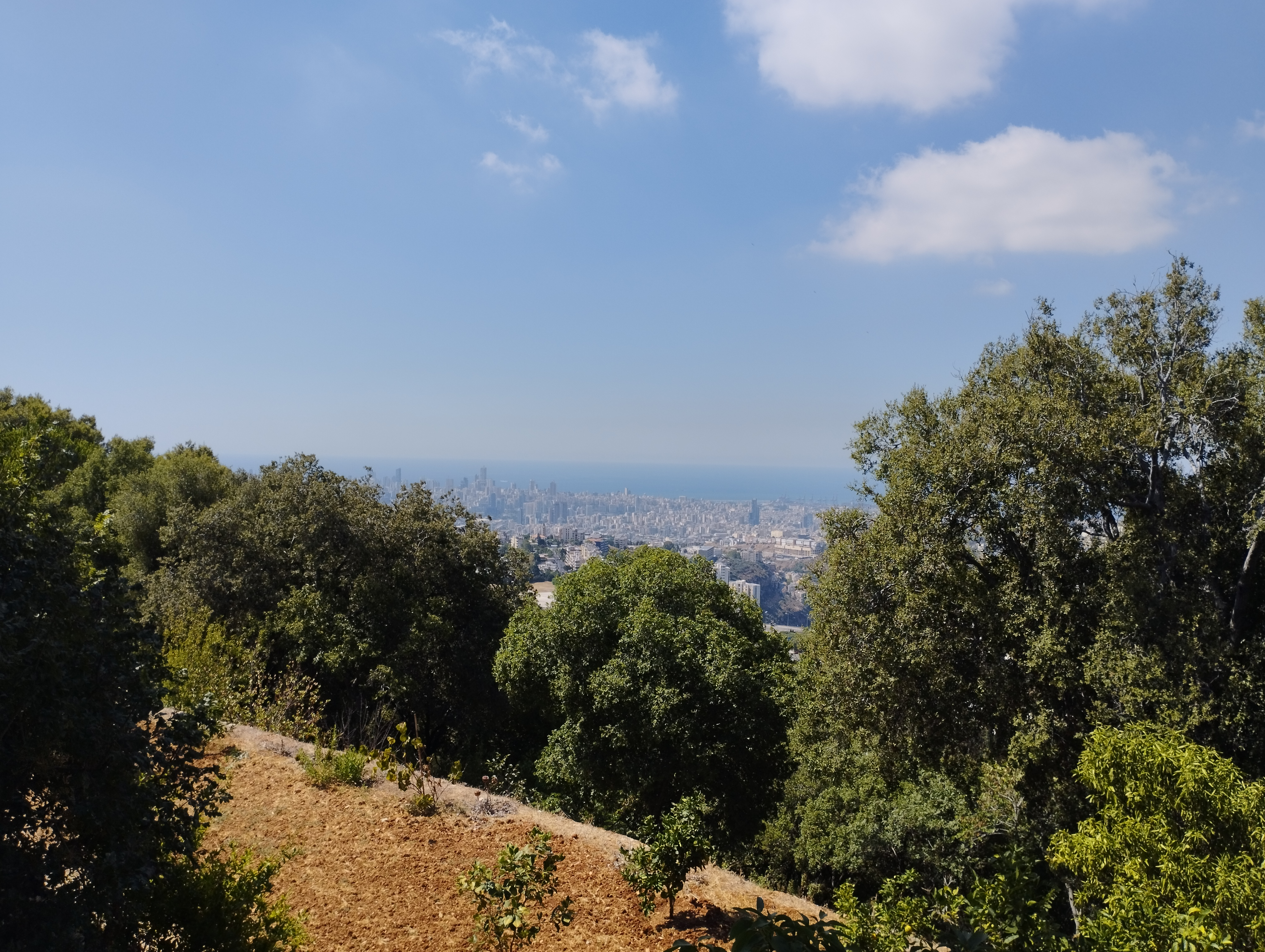
Collège Notre-Dame de Jamhour - View of Beirut

- Bechara Boutros al-Rahi, Maronite Patriarch
- Michel Eddé, lawyer, philanthrope, former Minister of telecommunications, culture, higher education, and former Chairman of L'Orient-Le Jour
- Bachir Gemayel, President of the Lebanese Republic
- Amine Gemayel, President of the Lebanese Republic
- Carlos Ghosn, former CEO of Nissan-Renault
- Philippe Jabre, founder and CIO of Jabre Capital Partners, S.A.
- Joseph Philippe Karam, modernist architect
- Adnan Kassar, chairman of Fransabank
- Nassib Lahoud, MP in the Lebanese Parliament
- Pierre Lequiller, MP in the French Assemblée Nationale
- Alexandre Najjar, Laureat of the Grand Prize of the Francophonie 2021
- Amin Maalouf, French author and perpetual secretary of the Académie Française since 2023
- Ziad Rahbani, musician, playwright, thinker
- Riad Salameh, former Governor of Lebanon's central bank
- Gabriel Yared, music composer
- Kim Ghattas, journalist and political scientist, author of the book Black Wave

== See also ==
- Catholic Church in Lebanon
- Education in Lebanon
- Education in the Ottoman Empire
- List of Jesuit schools
