= Ramadan al-Bouti =

Kurdish Sunni Muslim scholar (1929–2013)

Shaykh Ramadan al-Bouti
- رَمَضَان ٱلْبُوطِي
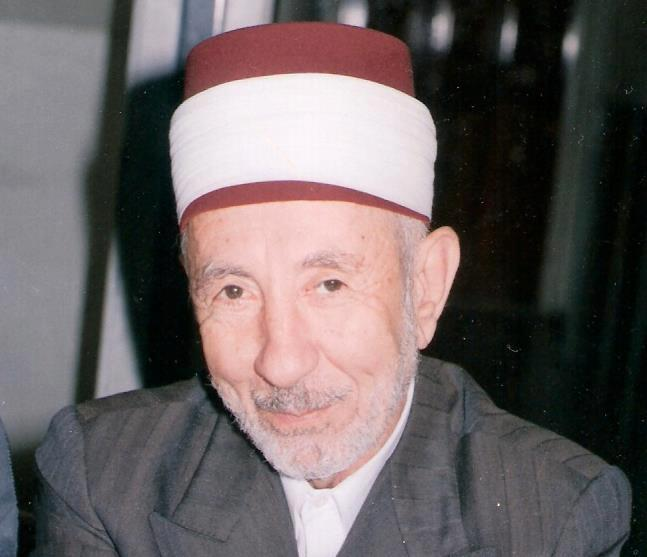
- Al-Bouti in 2013

Personal life
- Born: 1929 Cizre, Turkey
- Died: 21 March 2013 (aged 83–84) Damascus, Syria
- Resting place: Mausoleum Of Saladin, Damascus
- Era: Modern
- Region: Syria

Religious life
- Religion: Islam
- Denomination: Sunni
- Jurisprudence: Shafi'i
- Creed: Ash'ari
- Movement: Islamic neo-traditionalism

Muslim leader
- Influenced by: Said Nursi, al-Nawawi, al-Shafi'i, al-Ghazali, Abu Bakr ibn al-Arabi
- Influenced: Adnan Ibrahim
- Awards: Dubai International Holy Quran Award, 2004

Muhammad Said Ramadan Al-Bouti (Arabic: مُحَمَّد سَعِيد رَمَضَان ٱلْبُوطِي, romanized: Muḥammad Saʿīd Ramaḍān al-Būṭī) (1929 – 21 March 2013) was a renowned Syrian Sunni Muslim scholar and author. He was served as professor and vice dean at the Damascus University, also serving as the imam of the Umayyad Mosque.

Al-Bouti wrote more than sixty books on Islamic law and theology. He was a leading figure of Islamic neo-traditionalism which adhered to the four schools of thought in Sunni Islam and the orthodox Ash'arite creed. His works have been highly regarded to be a pivotal defense of Sunni Islam against opposing ideologies such as Secularism, Marxism, and Nationalism along with reformist movements of Wahhabism and Islamic Modernism.

On 21 March 2013, al-Bouti was assassinated at the Al-Iman Mosque in Damascus. The circumstances around the event are still unclear.

== Early life ==
Al-Bouti was born in 1929 in the village of Jeilka, located near Cizre, Turkey. His father was Mulla Ramadan Al-Bouti, an ulama and hails from the Hadhabani Kurdish tribe that was present in a number of regions across Levant, Iraq, and Turkey. When Al-Bouti was four years old, his family migrated to Damascus due to Ataturk's secularization.

He was enrolled in a primary school and received specialized religious tutoring from his father. At the age of eleven, al-Bouti studied the Qur'an and Prophet Muhammad's biography with Shaykh Hasan Habannakah and Shaykh al-Maradlnl in the Manjak Mosque in al-Midan. Later when the mosque was transformed into the Institute of Islamic Orientation, he studied Qur'an exegesis, logic, rhetoric and the fundamental principles of Islamic jurisprudence until 1953.

In 1954, he travelled to Cairo to complete his undergraduate studies at Al Azhar University, at the Faculty of Sharia.

On the completion of his three-year degree in law from the Faculty of Sharia Al-Azhar, and another Diploma in Education from the Faculty of English again at Al-Azhar, al-Bouti returned to Damascus with a Sharfa teaching qualification (ijaza) and an education diploma.

== Career ==
Al-Bouti started his career teaching at a secondary school in Homs between 1958 and 1961. He was appointed lecturer at the Faculty of Sharia at the University of Damascus in 1960. He went to Al Azhar University for a doctorate in Shariah and received his doctorate (PhD) in 1965.

He returned as an instructor at the University of Damascus in 1965, eventually becoming the dean of the Faculty of Sharia at the same university from 1977 to 1983. He subsequently became a lecturer in comparative law and religious studies at Damascus University; for some time he was also the Dean of the Sharfa faculty. Al-Bouti was professor of comparative law, and worked as lecturer on Islamic Creed (aqeedah) and Muhammad's Biography (seerah).

He was also a visiting professor at many Arab and Islamic universities and supervised the master's and doctoral degrees in the Sharia College at Damascus University and other universities.

Al-Bouti was a member of the Aal al-Bayt Foundation for Islamic Thought in Amman, Jordan, of the Supreme Council of the Academy of Oxford and of the Supreme Advisory Council for the Tabah Foundation in Abu Dhabi.

During the Muslim Brotherhood's revolution in 1979 in Syria, al-Bouti vocally condemned the attacks against the Syrian Baathist government by Islamist militants, while most of his senior colleagues were either silent or supportive of the opposition. Al-Bouti was chosen for the Dubai International Holy Quran Award in its eighth session in 2004 (1425 AH) to be the "personality of the Muslim world". In 2008, Al-Bouti was appointed preacher of the Umayyad Mosque in Damascus.

== Ideologies ==
Most of al-Bouti's ideas are put forward within the framework of traditional legal scholarship, frequently referring to Qur'anic verses, Hadith and the opinions of the leading classical authorities, in particular al-Nawawi, Ibn al-Arabi, al-Ghazali, and al-Shafi'i. Due to his profession, al-Bouti regards Islamic law as the core of the Islamic religion; whenever he speaks of Islam he means the principles, injunctions and practical implications of the Sharia.

In his preaching and writings, Al Bouti worked to refute not only secularism but other western ideologies such as Marxism and nationalism. In addition he criticized the proponents of what some viewed as Islamic reform, from modernist Muhammad Abduh to Salafi literalist Muhammad Nasiruddin al-Albani.

He devoted one book to criticising dialectical materialism. He wrote two books refuting the views of Salafism and explaining their incoherence:

- Al-La Madhhabiyya (Abandoning the Madhhabs) is the most dangerous Bid‘ah Threatening the Islamic Shari'a
- As-Salaf was a blessed epoch, not a school of thought.

Al-Bouti had a "long-standing opposition to both military and political activism in the name of Islam" based on the belief that Islam should be 'the common element that unites' all political forces rather than taking the side of one force, which he explained in his book Jihad in Islam (1993). Al-Bouti was not, however, opposed to operations carried out by the Palestinians in the occupied territories against the state of Israel. He supported the decision of Azhar University to freeze the dialogue with the Vatican after the Pope's comments that offended Muslims.

Al-Bouti specialized in fiqh (Islamic jurisprudence) and usul al-fiqh (principles of jurisprudence) according to the Shafi'i school of law. Most of his views are based on the Qur'an, hadiths and the opinions of the leading classical authorities, such as al-Nawawi, al-Ghazali and al-Shafi’i.

Aside from religious matters, he also wrote various works on non-religious subjects such his translation of Mam and Zin, a famous Kurdish story, into Arabic.

== Syrian protests 2011 and his position ==
Following the outbreak of the Syrian revolution in March 2011, Al-Bouti criticised anti-government protests and urged demonstrators not to follow "calls of unknown sources that want to exploit mosques to incite seditions and chaos in Syria."

Al-Bouti did criticise President Assad in public, shortly after demonstrations had started, for a government decision to fire hundreds of female teachers for wearing the hijab. Following Al-Bouti's criticism, the decision was quickly revoked by President Assad.

== Death ==
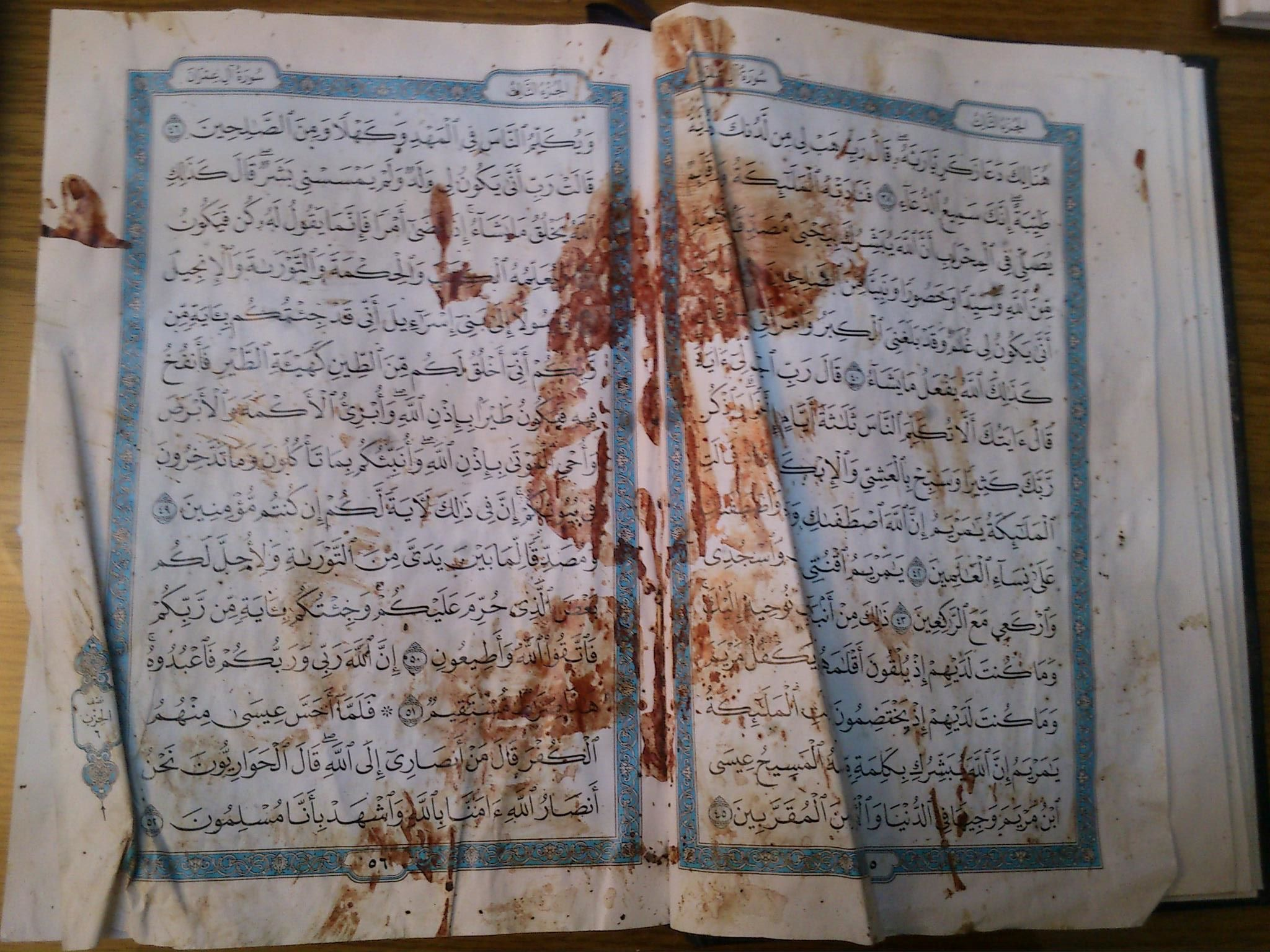
A copy of the Quran was in the hand of Al-Bouti at the time of assassination

Al-Bouti was killed while giving a religious lesson to students at the Al-Iman Mosque in the central Mazraa district of Damascus. The bomb attack reportedly killed at least 42 people and wounded more than 84. It marked the first time during the civil war a suicide bomber detonated explosives inside a mosque. Al-Bouti's death is said to have removed "one of the few remaining pillars of opposition to the uprising" among the majority Sunni Muslims who have formed the base of support for the uprising.

According to Thomas Pierret – a lecturer in Contemporary Islam at the University of Edinburgh – the death of Al-Bouti means the loss of the "last credible ally among the Sunni religious elite" for the Syrian government. Al-Bouti was "a Muslim scholar of world standing," Pierret states.

There was no immediate claim of responsibility for the attack and both the government and the opposition condemned the attack and accused each other of perpetrating it. Among opposition forces there was "a mixture of suspicion and shock that a notable religious figure ... would be targeted" by a suicide bomber inside a mosque.

=== Videos ===
Some, including Jim Muir of the BBC, have questioned whether a bomb killed Al-Bouti. Official film footage shown on Syrian television taken after the bombing appears to belie a bomb scene, showing "superficial debris, but not the kind of structural damage or bloodbath that would be expected from a huge bomb killing 50 people in an enclosed space".

The BBC claims Al-Bouti shows no sign of serious injury following the explosion, and his desk and the books on it are not disturbed. However within seconds a man with his back to the camera walks up to the scholar, does something and then leaves, leaving al-Bouti "limp" and "bleeding heavily from the mouth and from a wound to the left side of his head". Almost immediately al-Bouti is carried away by five other figures. None of the figures show any attempt "to attend to [Al-Bouti] or investigate his injuries", and their movements have "nothing of the panic and chaos that accompanies big bomb explosions in crowded places". The authenticity of this video "has not so far been seriously challenged" and its "implication seemed to be that the sheikhs' killing was the work of the regime".

In reply to the video, Syrianews.cc gave an interview to the Sheikh's son, Tawfiq for his account of the event. According to the interview,

"All the injured told the same story of the bombing, a man entered the mosque & sat alone. Later he walked and bombed himself. My father leaned to the right after being injured and tried to adjust his hat. When the injury took effect he fell to the left."

In December 2013, Syrian television showed what it claimed were confessions to the murder of al-Bouti by Syrian, Iraqi and Palestinian members of Jabhat al-Nusra.

== Works ==
Al-Bouti published nearly 60 books and religious publications (in Arabic), some of philosophical nature. Most of his philosophical works are published by Dar Al-Fikr:

Selective books include:

- نقض أوهام المادية الجدلية (Illusions of Dialectical Materialism)
- المذاهب التوحيدية والفلسفات المعاصرة (Monotheistic Schools and Contemporary Philosophies)
- كبرى اليقينيات الكونية :وجود الخالق و وظيفة المخلوق (The Greatest Universal Sureties: The Creator's Existence and the Creature's Function)
- أوربة من التقنية إلى الروحانية – مشكلة الجسر المقطوع (Europe from Technology to Spiritual Life – The problem of a broken bridge)
- حوار حول مشكلات حضارية (Dialogue About Civilizational Issues)
- فقه السيرة النبوية مع موجز لتاريخ الخلافة الراشدة (The Jurisprudence of the Prophetic Biography and a Brief History of the Rightly guided Caliphate)
- (لحوار سبيل التعايش (ندوات الفكر المعاصر (Dialogue Among Civilizations : The Way for Coexistence (seminars about contemporary thought))
- المذهب الاقتصادي بين الشيوعية والإسلام (Economic Theory Between Communism and Islam)
- قضايا فقهية معاصرة. (Contemporary Jurisprudential Issues) (two volumes)
- المذاهب التوحيدية والفلسفات المعاصرة (Monotheistic Religions and Modern Philosophies)
- باكورة اعمالي الفكرية (The Early fruits of My Intellectual Works)
- منهج الحضارة الإنسانية في القرآن (Methodology of Human Civilization in the Koran)
- (الإسلام والعصر تحديات وآفاق (حوارات لقرن جديد (Islam and Modern Age: Challenges and Prospects (Dialogues for a New Century))
- (التغيير مفهومه وطرائقه (ندوات الفكر المعاصر (The Change, its Concept and Modalities (Modern Thought Seminars))
- دور الأديان في السلام العالمي (The Role of Religions in World Peace)
- حقائق عن نشأة القومية (Facts about the Emergence of Nationalism)
- المرأة بين طغيان النظام الغربي ولطائف التشريع الرباني (Women: The Tyranny of the Western System and the Kindness in Divine Legislation)
- هذا والدي (This Is My Father) (a biography of Mulla Ramadan Al-Bouti)
- مموزين (Momo Zein) (a Kurdish novel by Ahmede Khani)
- الجهاد في الإسلام: كيف نفهمه؟ وكيف نمارسه؟ (The Jihad in Islam: How Should We Understand? And How Should We Practice?)
- الإنسان مسير أم مخير (Human beings between compatibilism and determinism)
- هذه مشكلاتهم (These Are Their Problems)
- عائشة: ام المؤمنين (Aisha: Mother of Believers)
- في سبيل الله والحق (In the Sake of God and Rightness)
- الحِكم العطائية شرح وتحليل (Al-Attaúah Advices, Explanation, and Analysis) (4 volumes)
- مشورات اجتماعية (Social advices)
- هذا ما قلته أمام بعض الرؤساء والملوك (That's What I Said to Some presidents and Kings)
- التعرف على الذات هو الطريق المعبد إلى الإسلام (The recognition of self is a Paved Way to Islam)
- من روائع القرآن الكريم (Some Masterpieces of the Holy Koran)
- شخصيات استوقفتني (Personalities That attracted my observation)

TV programs:

- لا يأتيه الباطل – Shaam channel / Sani'ou al Qarar channel
- Koranic studies, Syrian Satellite TV
- شرح كتاب كبرى اليقينيات الكونية – in the series "Al Kalaam al Tayyeb" – Al-Resalah Satellite TV
- مشاهد وعبر – Al-Resalah Satellite TV
- فقه السيرة – Iqraa TV
- شرح الحكم العطائية – Sufiah channel.
- الجديد في إعجاز القرآن الكريم – Iqraa TV
- هذا هو الجهاد – Azhari TV channel.
