= Beer in Lebanon =

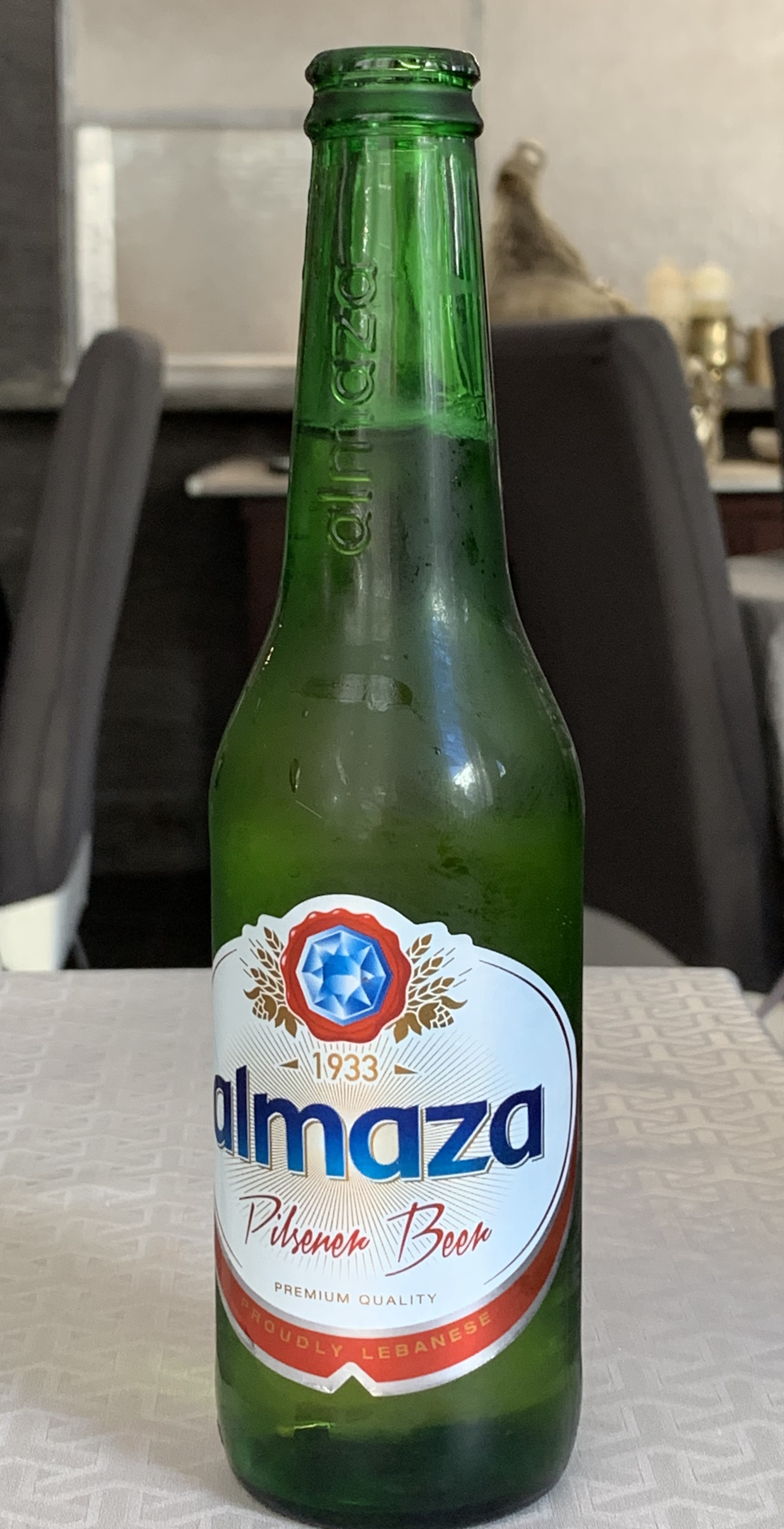
Almaza pilsner beer

Beer is a popular alcoholic beverage in Lebanon. Lebanon's rich cultural heritage, vibrant social scene, and appreciation for dining out, along with local cuisine like mezze and grilled meats that pair well with beer, contribute to the strong demand for alcoholic drinks, including beer. According to a 2018 World Health Organization report, beer consumption in Lebanon amounts to 34% of the total alcohol consumed in the country.

== History ==
In the Levant, the production and consumption of beer dates back to between 5500 and 3900 BCE and by the Early Bronze Age (c. 3300–2300 BCE), beer drinking became common across much of the ancient Near East.

One of the earliest pieces of evidence of beer in ancient Lebanon is housed at the Archaeological Museum of the American University of Beirut, which displays a variety of alcohol-related artifacts, including a collection of small Iron Age beer jugs from the Bekaa, Sidon, Tell El Ghassil, and Palestine.

The Grande Brasserie du Levant, established by George Gellad in 1931, is Lebanon's oldest brewery, renowned for its beer brand Laziza. Laziza was one of the most popular beers in Lebanon during the 1960s and 1970s.

Almaza is also one of the oldest beer brands in Lebanon. Brasserie Almaza SAL, a German-style pilsner beer, was founded by three families, Angelopoulu, Comaty, and Jabre in 1933.

== Economy ==
The beer market in Lebanon has grown, fueled by shifting consumer preferences, emerging trends, and local factors. In 2025, the beer market in Lebanon is expected to generate a total revenue of US$90.6 million, with US$70.6 million coming from at-home sales and US$20.1 million from out-of-home sales. At-home revenue is projected to grow at a 1.56% annual rate from 2025 to 2029.

For generations, Lebanon's beer market was dominated by Almaza, producing an estimated 24 million liters annually, alongside competition from imported brands like Heineken, Corona, Efes, and Budweiser, especially in the 1990s and early 2000s. Craft beer was almost unknown in Lebanon until 2006, when Mazen Hajjar and his partners launched a microbrewery and introduced 961 to the market, prompting Almaza to introduce Almaza Malt, a darker alternative to its pilsner, followed by Almaza Light and Al Rayess beer.

== Breweries and brands ==
=== Almaza ===
Almaza has long been a popular beer in Lebanon, but Brasserie Almaza's market dominance ended as competition, such as Kassatly Chtaura's Beirut Beer and new craft beers became available.

The brewery was bought by Heineken in 2002.

Hedge fund manager Philippe Jabre bought back the majority stake in Brasserie Almaza from Heineken after the company faced economic problems in Lebanon. Jabre stepped in to prevent the brewery's closure, preserving nearly 200 jobs, and increased exports from 25% to 40% of Almaza's annual production of 200,000 hectolitres.

=== Beirut Beer ===
Beirut Beer is a pilsner beer, produced and bottled by Kassatly Chtaura, one of the largest drinks producer in Lebanon.

While Beirut Beer is a commercial beer rather than a craft one, its advertising campaign played a key role in expanding the Lebanese beer market. The campaign encouraged consumers to explore new varieties. This generated greater interest in beer and ultimately led to an increase in per capita consumption. With this growing interest, distributors began importing more beer varieties to Lebanon.

=== CedarCraft ===
Cedar Craft is a 0.33L pilsner beer with an alcohol volume of 4.8%, priced at 7.58 euro per liter.

=== Colonel Brewery And Distillery ===
Colonel became Lebanon's second craft brewery after 961 Beer. Founded in Batroun by Jamil Haddad, the brewery produces five beers: a filtered and unfiltered lager, a light German beer, a red Irish, and a black Irish, all brewed using traditional Czech technology.

=== Elmir Craft Beer ===
Elmir Craft Beer is one of the few modern breweries in Lebanon. They have been in operation since November 2018. Since its launch, ELMIR has received 20 international beer awards, including two medals at the 2026 World Beer Awards: a Silver Medal for its Wheat Ale in the Wheat Beer – Bavarian Style Hefeweiss category and a Bronze Medal for Aleph in the Speciality Beer – Experimental category. ELMIR has operated its brewery in Mar Mikhael, Beirut, since 2025. The brewery offers guided tours and tasting sessions.

=== Laziza ===
George Gellad founded Laziza in 1931, establishing the first brewery in the Levant. The brewery's lager became Lebanon's most popular beer, until the outbreak of the civil war, which led to its closure in 1990. In 1999, Georges Khazam, the grandson of the original founder, revived the brand by reintroducing Laziza beer, along with a new non-alcoholic version.

=== 961 ===
961 is a pale ale with a dry, almost woody character, infused with Lebanese flavors like sumac, sage, and mint, featuring a well-balanced body, herbal dryness, and a nutty maltiness. Mazen Hajjar, founder of 961 Beer, began brewing at home, and thanks to the success of his beers, the brand now includes a range of styles like a Lebanese Pale Ale brewed with local spices. It became one of the few Levantine microbreweries that exports worldwide. By 2021, the brewery was producing 300,000 cases annually and exporting to 16 countries.

== See also ==
- Arak, Lebanon's National Drink
- Lebanese wine
