= Austria–Syria relations =

- Austria: Syria

Austria–Syria relations are the bilateral relations between the Republic of Austria and Syria. In April 2009, President Bashar al-Assad visited Vienna at the invitation of President Heinz Fischer. In 2012, due to the security situation, some staff of the Austrian Embassy in Damascus was transferred to Beirut, and some activities of the embassy have been conducted from there since then. Officially, the embassy of Austria in Damascus was never closed and the ambassadors resided in Damascus despite the civil war. Austria resisted efforts led by the United Kingdom to lift or ease the EU arms embargo on Syria, "contending that increased weaponry will only intensify the conflict and potentially eliminate any opportunities for peace negotiations". In 2015, Foreign Minister Sebastian Kurz stated that the West should involve Assad in the struggle against the Islamic State.

It was reported in 2021 that Austria is considering fully resuming relations with Syria together with at least 4 other EU member states.

There are roughly 95,000 of Syrians in Austria as of 2024, most of whom came after 2014. Following the outcome of the civil war in Syria and change of government, Austria pause asylum applications and family reunions.

== Diplomatic missions ==
- Since 1978, Austria has an embassy in Damascus. (resident Ambassador since November 2024: Isabel Rauscher)
- Syria has an embassy in Vienna. (resident Ambassador since April 2021: Hassan Khaddour)

== See also ==
- Foreign relations of Austria
- Foreign relations of Syria
- Syrians in Austria
