= Philippe Jabre =

Lebanese businessman

- Born: 1960 (age 65–66); Beirut, Lebanon
- Education: Concordia University; Columbia Business School
- Occupation: Hedge Fund Manager
- Known for: Founder of Jabre Capital Partners; Founder of Association Philippe Jabre
- Title: CEO and CIO of Jabre Capital Partners S.A
- Children: 4

Philippe Jabre is the founder, CEO and CIO of Jabre Capital Partners S.A, a Geneva-based wealth and asset management firm and multi-family office, and a former managing director of GLG Partners, a UK-based hedge fund.

== Early life ==
Jabre was born in 1960 in Beirut, Lebanon, and studied at Collège Notre-Dame de Jamhour. He graduated from Concordia University in 1980 with a bachelor's degree in economics and earned an MBA from Columbia Business School in 1982, where he is a member of the Board of Overseers. In 2023, he was awarded an honorary doctorate from Saint Joseph University in Beirut in recognition of his contributions to education and philanthropy.

== Career ==
Jabre began his career at JP Morgan and then worked at BAII Asset Management (a French consortium bank later taken over by BNP Paribas). During his 16 years there, he specialised in the emerging market for convertible arbitrage, a strategy that involved buying a company's convertible bonds and selling short the company's stock.

=== GLG Partners ===
Jabre joined GLG in 1997, two years after the firm had been founded. During his nine years at GLG, he managed as much as $7 billion. Jabre left GLG in 2006, during a 2-year investigation by the FSA. Jabre was fined £750,000, at the time the largest individual fine issued by the FSA after it had found that he had engaged in non-deliberate market abuse. in 2006 for breaching FSA principles. This was, at that time, the largest fine the FSA had issued against an individual. The FSA's Regulatory Decisions Committee concluded that the breach was not deliberate and that he did not violate the FSA's Principle 1 governing market integrity, choosing not to ban or suspend him. In an interview with CNBC, Jabre asserted that “when he was fined in London for market abuse, the rules and regulations were "not as clear" as they are now"

=== Jabre Capital Partners ===
On October 11, 2006, it was announced that Philippe Jabre was set to open a new hedge fund in Geneva, Switzerland, after his non-compete contract with GLG Partners expired. The fund opened in February 2007 and was one of the largest new launches in recent years, as many of Jabre's old clients followed him to his new venture, along with a significant number of new investors. The fund - JabCap Multi Strategy Fund - closed very shortly afterwards with $5 billion under management and Jabre Capital Partners having been one of the largest hedge funds in Switzerland at the time.

In 2018, Jabre decided to draw a line under his hedge fund activities. He returned external capital in the funds as part of a restructuring of the firm, and decided to refocus on its historical wealth management activities. Since June 2020, Jabre Capital Partners has relaunched its asset management activities focused on the firm's core strategies.

Jabre Capital Partners is an active member of the Association Suisse des Gérants de Fortune (ASG).

=== Awards and industry recognition ===
In 2013, Jabre Capital was one of Europe's top-performing hedge funds and won EuroHedge's Management Firm of the Year award.

In March 2014, the firm won three awards at the HedgePo Investors Choice Awards: Fund of the Year, Global Equity Fund of the Year and Global Multi-strategy Fund of the Year.

Jabre also wrote the foreword of The Handbook of Convertible Bonds: Pricing, Strategies and Risk Management of Jan De Spiegeleer and Wim Schoutens

=== Brasserie Almaza ===
In December 2021, Jabre acquired majority ownership of Brasserie Almaza, the Lebanese beer brewery. This brought the company back into family control almost 90 years after it was founded by the Jabre family in 1933 and was at risk of being closed. In 2022, Jabre reported that Almaza profits had reached 8 per cent of its sales but the difficult economic situation in Lebanon continued to limit the company. Heineken Group, which had held a majority stake in the company since 2003, remains a minority shareholder and continues to provide access to international brands and technical expertise.

== Philanthropy ==
In 2001, Jabre founded Association Philippe Jabre (APJ), a Beirut-based non-profit organization recognized by the Lebanese Ministry of Interior. The association focuses on improving access to education and healthcare for underprivileged communities in Lebanon. It has awareded over 2900 university scholarships and supported more than 8900 individual socio-medical cases.

APJ operated independently but is based on the premises of Arcenciel, a Lebanese NGO it also supports. The association has partnered with cultural and education initiatives in Lebanon, including supporting events like the Beirut Art Film Festival and the Home Works forum organized by Ashkal Alwan.

In 2015 the American University of Beirut announced a gift from Philippe and Zaza Jabre to support art history and curating initiatives, including endowments for a professorial chair, an exhibition fund and a visiting lecturer series. AUB said the gift built on the Philippe Jabre Scholarship, which had been established in 2004.

== Art collection ==
Philippe Jabre owns a private art collection focused on Western representations of Lebanon from the 17th to the 20th centuries. Curated by Gaby Daher since 1989, it includes over 3,000 works, such as Orientalist paintings, drawings, vintage travel posters, and early photographs.

The collection is displayed in Beit Chabab, Lebanon, where a museum space was developed around the Jabre family's 19th-century summer residence and an adjacent former bell foundry. The collection features works by artists such as Gustav Bauernfeind, Antoine-Alphonse Montfort, David Hockney, and Andy Warhol. Works have been exhibited at the Sursock Museum in Beirut on two occasions in 2016 and 2019.

Works from Jabre's collection have been displayed in exhibitions such as A Tribute to Lebanon at the Beirut Art Fair (2019), and Impressions of Paradise (2025), which displayed 80 travel and film posters from the collection exploring Lebanon's image between 1920 and 1970.

In 2018, Philippe and Zaza Jabre received the Montblanc de la Culture Arts Patronage Award in Beirut, recognising their long-term support for education, health, and the arts in Lebanon, including initiatives such as Ashkal Alwan, the Beirut Art Center, and the endowment of an Art History professorship at the American University of Beirut.

== Personal life ==
He is a skier. He is also married with four children. Philippe is a trustee for the American University of Beirut.

His house above Beirut, a family property creatively renovated after suffering heavy damage during the Lebanese Civil War, was designed by architect Nabil Gholam.
