= Fadi Merza =

Syrian-Austrian martial artist (born 1976)

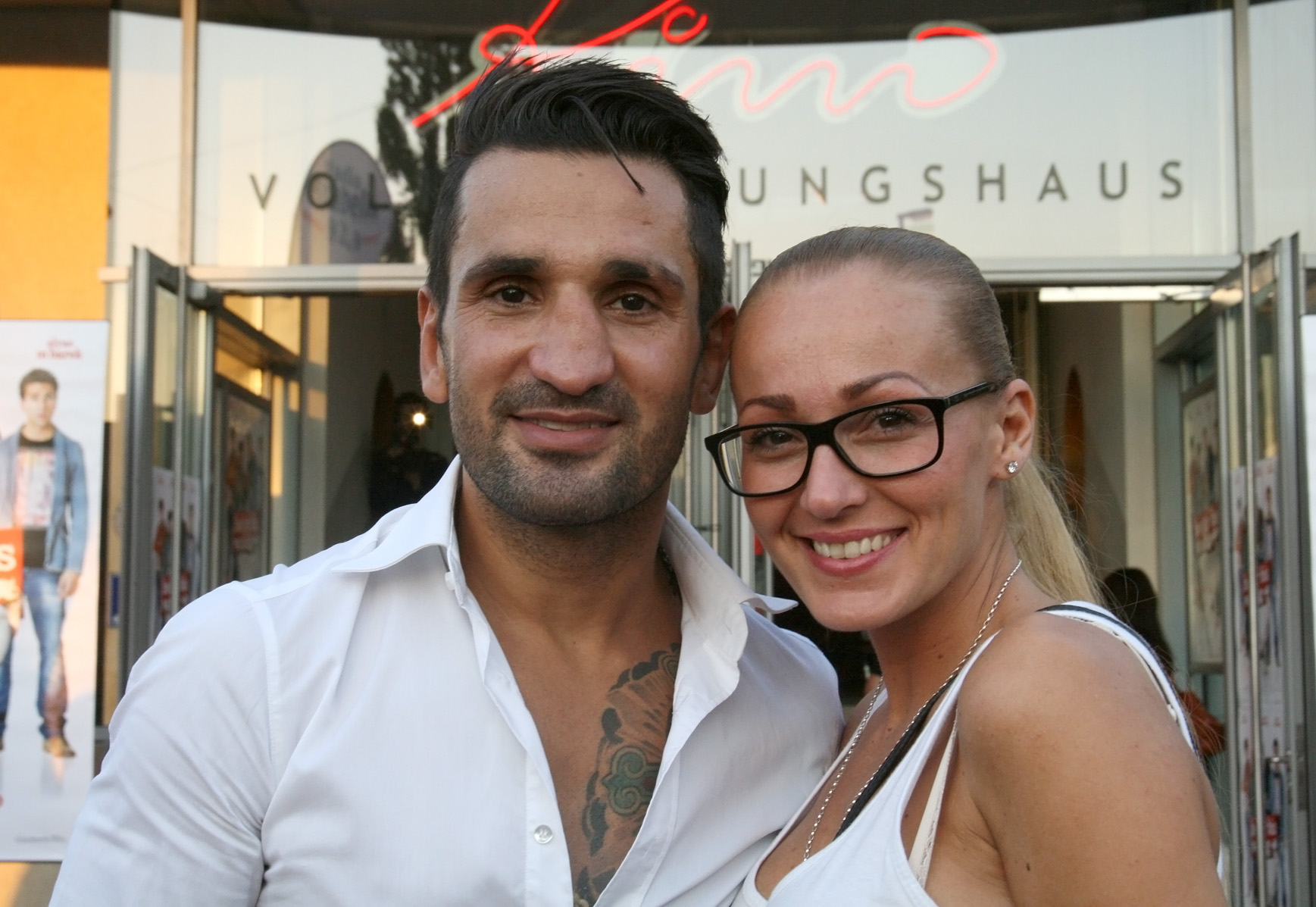
- Fadi and Ines Merza (Vienna 2012)
- Born: Fadi Merza; 8 March 1978 (age 48); Al-Dirbasiyah, Syria
- Other names: The Beast
- Nationality: Syrian-Austrian
- Height: 1.80 m (5 ft 11 in)
- Weight: 72 kg (159 lb; 11.3 st)
- Division: Middleweight
- Reach: 71.0 in (180 cm)
- Style: Muay Thai
- Stance: Orthodox
- Team: Octagon; City Thong Gym; Team Merza
- Years active: 1997–present

Kickboxing record
- Total: 155
- Wins: 127
- By knockout: 53
- Losses: 26
- Draws: 2
- Last updated on: 22 February 2014

Fadi Merza (born 8 March 1978) is a Syrian-born Austrian retired middleweight kickboxer. Merza was a multiple world kickboxing and Muay Thai champion.

== Biography and career ==
=== Early years ===
Fadi Merza was born in Al-Dirbasiyah, Syria. He was ten years old, when he and his family left his native Syria and moved to Vienna. At the age of 16, Fadi started training kickboxing. After fighting as an amateur in the kickboxing circuit, he switched to Muay Thai. He was awarded his first title at age 18, when he won the WPKL Junior World Super Welterweight Championship during an event near Vienna, Austria on 15 November 1997.

Having become a youth champion, Merza was given the chance in 2000 to fight for the World Muay Thai Middleweight Championship of the World Professional Kickboxing Council (WPKC), one of the minor sanctioning organizations in the world. Fadi decisioned his opponent to win his second World title. In May 2001, the European Thaiboxing Championship of the more prestigious WKA was at stake. He faced off against the routined Brit Eugene Valerio at the first Vienna Fight Night. Valerio was troubled by Fadi’s accurate knee strikes, suffering a cut above his eye. A well placed kick to the midsection finally proved to be the Brit’s downfall, by breaking his forearm. Fadi won via TKO in the second round.

A year later, again in Vienna, Fadi challenged Mohammed Ouali for the vacant WKA Thaiboxing World Middleweight title. The fight went to the distance after five grueling rounds. In front of his hometown crowd Fadi lost a close decision. Despite his defeat he was signed by Austrian businessman Marcus Bauer for his kickboxing organization SuperLeague.

=== Fighting for SuperLeague ===
Merza made his debut in SuperLeague at the kick off show in Vienna in May 2003. Fadi showed a dominant performance against Takahiko Shimizu from Japan. At his second SuperLeague appearance, in Wuppertal, Germany, he faced off against another Japanese fighter, Akeomi Nitta. Fadi dominated the first two rounds, but the fight soon turned into a tough battle. After five hard rounds, Merza got a decision victory.

In January 2004, Merza challenged Kamal El Amrani for his IKBO World Middleweight Championship belt. In front of a sold-out crowd, again going to distance in a spectacular fight, Fadi lost a close decision against his well-known Moroccan adversary. Fadi Merza claimed the number three spot in the official SuperLeague middleweight rankings with victories over Peter Crook, Jose Reis, Petr Polak and Malaipet Sasiprapa and losing only his fights against Ole Laursen, Sahin Yakut and John Wayne Parr. Ending his successful SuperLeague career, Fadi faced Alviar Lima for the vacant SuperLeague Middleweight belt, losing a close decision. His fight against Lima is still considered by many fight fans as the best bout in SuperLeague history.

=== King's Cup participation ===
Merza was able to return to the winner's column in impressive fashion by knocking out Ümüt Demirörüs and Rico Recineu, in one night to win the King’s Cup qualifier tournament in Switzerland in September 2009. Fadi earned himself a spot in the King's Cup, the most prestigious and biggest Muay Thai tournament in the world, which is held once a year in Bangkok, Thailand. Cheered on by over 150,000 spectators, Merza defeated his quarter final opponent, Enriko Kehl from Germany. Kehl hit the canvas twice, after being hit with hard elbows and knees, giving Merza the well deserved decision victory. Unfortunately, Fadi had to withdraw from the tournament due to a ruptured ear drum, as well as a cut over his right eye, forcing the ring-side doctor to not give his consent for another fight.

=== World title success ===
After fighting for SuperLeague, Merza had regular appearances in international promotions all over the world. Merza was given the chance to fight for a world title again on 7 February 2010, taking on Luca D’Isanto for the ISKA Oriental Light Middleweight Championship. Staged at the Wiener Stadium in the centre of Vienna, Merza hurt Di Santo in the first round with a knee to the head. The Italian took an eight count but wasn’t ready to give up. Merza had to earn the title winning a clear unanimous decision. Before the year was done, he added one more world title to his mantlepiece, outpointing Bachir Maroun in Munich, Germany on 25 August 2010 to take the WKA K-1 rules World Super Welterweight belt.

On 22 January 2011, Fadi faced Joakim Karlsson in Vienna, Austria. A rematch as Karlsson defeated him in their first encounter. He decisioned the Swede over five rounds for the WKA K-1 rules World Middleweight title. Merza made an impressive six successful title defenses during his reign as champion. For his first defense, he chose to fight Dan Balsemao from Portugal in a rematch. Balsemao had performed well in their first encounter, winning the fight on points. However, this time Merza bested the Portuguese over five rounds to defend the belt.

Fadi's next title defense pitted him against Darko Delic. The kickboxer from Bosnia and Herzegovina was not regarded as a top contender and it took Merza only two rounds to end the fight. His next defense was against a much tougher opponent. In September 2012, he faced the highly regarded Dane Mohammed El Mir. Merza proved that he still belonged on the world stage when he defeated El Mir on points. In his sixth defense, Fadi was challenged by Jason Woodham, a WMC MAD champion from England. Merza dominated the fight from start to finish. In the first round, the Brit went to the canvas. Clearly not having recovered, Manhood went down again in the second round after a two right hooks and a left jab combination. The referee intervened and stopped the fight.

On 4 May 2012, Merza eventually lost his WKA K-1 rules World Middleweight title in his seventh title defense. After five rounds, almost everyone at ringside saw it as a draw. However, the fight went in favor of Fadi's opponent Fernando Calzetta, who was awarded a points win.

== Doping suspension ==
In 2013, Merza was suspended by the OPBU for 2 years for his refusal to submit a sample at Multiversum in Schwechat, Austria on 4 May 2013.

== Personal life ==
Fadi Merza is married to his longtime girlfriend Ines.

== Titles ==
- 2012 OPBU K-1 rules World Middleweight Championship
- 2011 WKA K-1 rules World Middleweight Championship (6 title defenses)
- 2010 WKA K-1 rules World Super Welterweight Championship
- 2010 ISKA Oriental World Light Middleweight Championship
- 2009 WMC King's Cup Challenge Tournament Champion
- 2001 WKA Thaiboxing European Middleweight Championship
- 2000 WPKC Muay Thai Middleweight Championship
- 1997 World Professional Kickboxing League (WPKL) Junior World Super Welterweight Championship

== Kickboxing record ==
Kickboxing record
127 wins (53 KOs), 26 losses, 2 draws
Date	Result	Opponent	Event	Location	Method	Round	Time
2014-12-06	Win	(Italy) Gianfranco Capurso	FFC 16: Vienna	Vienna, Austria	TKO	1	1:45
Retiring bout. Catchweight (72.5 kg).
2014-05-24	Loss	(Austria) Foad Sadeghi	Vienna Fight Night	Vienna, Austria	Decision	5	3:00
2014-02-22	Win	(Italy) Alex Gallone	Vienna Fight Night	Vienna, Austria	KO	2	
2013-05-04	Loss	(Italy) Fernando Calzetta	Multiversum	Schwechat, Austria	Decision	5	3:00
Loses WKA K-1 rules World Middleweight title.
2013-02-23	Win	(Montenegro) Ivan Tosković	Vienna Fight Night	Vienna, Austria	KO	1	0:55
2012-12-08	Win	(England) Jason Woodham	Vendetta VI	Vienna, Austria	KO	2	
Retains WKA K-1 rules World Middleweight title.
2012-09-29	Win	(Denmark) Mohamed El-Mir	Vienna Fight Night	Vienna, Austria	Decision	5	3:00
Retains WKA K-1 rules World Middleweight title.
2012-06-30	Win	(Bosnia and Herzegovina) Darko Delic	Multiversum	Schwechat, Austria	TKO	2	
Retains WKA K-1 rules World Middleweight title and wins OPBU K-1 rules World Middleweight title.
2012-05-16	Win	(Portugal) Dan Balsemao	Vienna Fight Night	Vienna, Austria	Decision	5	3:00
Retains WKA K-1 rules World Middleweight title.
2012-04-29	Loss	(Greece) Mike Zambidis	Iron Challenge	Athens, Greece	Decision (Unanimous)	3	3:00
2012-03	Win	(Portugal) Dan Balsemao		Vienna, Austria	Decision	3	3:00
2012-02-17	Loss	(Japan) Yoshihiro Sato	Krush Vol. 16	Tokyo, Japan	Decision (Unanimous)	5	3:00
Loses ISKA Oriental World Light Middleweight title.
2011-04-30	Win	(Turkey) Imre Gyarmati	Premium Fight Night	Vienna, Austria	KO	1	
2011	Loss	(France) Cedric Muller	The Challenger Muaythai	Kuala Lumpur, Malaysia	Decision (Unanimous)	3	3:00
2011-04-09	Loss	(Turkey) Ali Gunyar	A1 World Combat Cup	Eindhoven, Netherlands	Decision (Unanimous)	3	3:00
Fight was for the WIPU K-1 rules World Super Middleweight title.
2011-02-25	Win	(Turkey) Ogün Sesli		Dubai, United Arab Emirates	Decision	3	3:00
2011-02-05	Win	(Czech Republic) Michal Halada	Nitrianska Noc Bojovnikov 3	Nitra, Slovakia	Decision (Unanimous)	3	3:00
2011-01-22	Win	(Sweden) Joakim Karlsson	X-3 League Austria vs Russia	Vienna, Austria	Decision	5	3:00
Wins WKA K-1 rules World Middleweight title.
2010-12-04	Win	(Hungary) Istvan Szucs	Ultimate Cage Fighters	Vienna, Austria	KO	1	
2010-09-25	Win	(Italy) Alessandro Iacono	Die Nacht der 8	Vienna, Austria	Decision (Unanimous)	3	3:00
2010-08-25	Win	(Germany) Bachir Maroun	Stekos Fight Night	Munich, Germany	Decision	5	3:00
Wins WKA K-1 rules World Super Welterweight title.
2010-06-05	Draw	(Republic of Ireland) Anthony Kane	Vienna Fight Night	Vienna, Austria	Decision draw	3	3:00
2010-05-08	Win	(Hungary) Krisztian Jaszka	Ultimate Cage Fighters 3	Vienna, Austria	TKO	3	
2010-04-03	Loss	(Syria) Baker Barakat	S-8 Thaiboxing	Wuppertal, Germany	Decision	3	3:00
2010-03-21	Loss	(Slovakia) Vladimír Moravčík	Gala Night Žilina 2010	Žilina, Slovakia	Decision	3	3:00
2010-03-06	Win	(France) Fabrice Riconneau		Vienna, Austria	KO		
2010-02-07	Win	(Italy) Luca D'Isanto		Vienna, Austria	Decision (Unanimous)	5	3:00
Wins ISKA Oriental World Light Middleweight title.
2009-12-05	Win	(Germany) Enriko Kehl	King's Cup, Quarter Final	Bangkok, Thailand	Decision	3	3:00
Despite winning fight, has to withdraw from tournament due to injury.
2009-10-31	Loss	(Netherlands) Alviar Lima	KlasH European Elimination	Martigny, Switzerland	Decision (Unanimous)	5	3:00
2009-09-26	Loss	(Sweden) Tobias Alexandersson	Battle of Sweden 2	Stockholm, Sweden	Decision (Unanimous)	5	3:00
2009-09-19	Win	(France) Rico Recineu	King's Cup Challenge, Final	Arosa, Switzerland	KO	1	
Wins WMC King's Cup Challenge tournament.
2009-09-19	Win	(Turkey) Ümüt Demirörüs	King's Cup Challenge, Semi Final	Arosa, Switzerland	KO	1	
2009-03-28	Loss	(Sweden) Joakim Karlsson	Battle of Sweden 1	Stockholm, Sweden	Decision (Split)	3	3:00
2009-02	Win	(France) Odje Manda	We are Back	Vienna, Austria	Decision	3	3:00
2009-01-17	Win	(Poland) Razadek Filip	Muay Thai Europe vs Thailande	Strasbourg, France	KO	4	
2008-10-19	Win	(Germany) Laurent Sachs	Lords of the Ring	Vienna, Austria	Decision (Unanimous)	3	3:00
2008-08-08	Win	(Germany) Muhammed Gür	Swiss Las Vegas 3	Basel, Switzerland	Decision (Unanimous)	3	3:00
2008-04-20	Win	(Belarus) Vasily Shish	Vienna Fight Night	Vienna, Austria	Decision	3	3:00
2008-03-03	Loss	(Thailand) Naruepol Fairtex	SLAMM "Nederland vs Thailand IV"	Almere, Netherlands	TKO (Corner stoppage)	4	0:00
2008-01-27	Win	(Germany) Mark Vogel		Vienna, Austria	Decision (Unanimous)	3	3:00
2007-12-15	Win	(Germany) Bartosz Koscielniak	Swiss Las Vegas 2	Basel, Switzerland	Decision (Unanimous)	3	3:00
2007-11-24	Loss	(France) Abdallah Mabel	Janus Fight Night 2007, Quarter Final	Padua, Italy	TKO	2	
2007-10-27	Loss	(Thailand) Samranchai 96 Penang	One Night in Bangkok	Antwerp, Belgium	Decision (Unanimous)	5	3:00
2007-07-21	Win	(Germany) Olli Koch	KlasH II	Albufeira, Portugal	Decision	3	3:00
2007-06-16	Win	(Morocco) Yousef Akhnikh	Vienna Fight Night	Vienna, Austria	Decision	5	3:00
2007-05-12	Win	(Morocco) Omar Amrami	Swiss Las Vegas 1	Basel, Switzerland	Decision	3	3:00
2007-03-03	Win			Vienna, Austria	KO		
2006-05-13	Loss	(Netherlands) Alviar Lima	SuperLeague Elimination 2006	Vienna, Austria	Decision	3	3:00
Fight was for the SuperLeague Middleweight title.
2006-03-11	Loss	(Turkey) Şahin Yakut	SuperLeague Apocalypse 2006	Paris, France	Decision	3	3:00
2006-01-28	Win	(Portugal) Jose Reis	SuperLeague Hungary 2006	Budapest, Hungary	Decision	5	3:00
2005-11-19	Win	(Romania) Florin Vintilă	SuperLeague Portugal 2005	Portugal	KO	2	
2005-10-22	Win	(Czech Republic) Petr Polak	SuperLeague Austria 2005	Vienna, Austria	Decision	5	3:00
2005-09-24	Loss	(Morocco) Kamal El Amrani	SuperLeague Turkey 2005	Istanbul, Turkey	Decision	3	3:00
2005-09-24	Win	(Thailand) Malaipet Sasiprapa	SuperLeague Turkey 2005	Istanbul, Turkey	Decision	3	3:00
2005-05-21	Win	(England) Peter Crooke	SuperLeague Germany 2005	Germany	Decision	5	3:00
2005-04-09	Loss	(Turkey) Şahin Yakut	SuperLeague Austria 2005	Vienna, Austria	Decision	5	3:00
2004-11-14	Loss	(Netherlands) Ray Staring	Vienna Fight Night	Vienna, Austria	Decision	5	3:00
Fight was for the WFCA Thaiboxing World Middleweight title.
2004-10-23	Win	(Switzerland) Thomas Hladky	SuperLeague Germany 2004	Germany	Decision	5	3:00
2004-05-22	Loss	(Denmark) Ole Laursen	SuperLeague Switzerland 2004	Winterthur, Switzerland	Decision	5	3:00
2004-03-20	Loss	(Australia) John Wayne Parr	SuperLeague Italy 2004	Padua, Veneto, Italy	Decision (Unanimous)	5	3:00
2004-01-25	Loss	(Morocco) Kamal El Amrani	Vienna Fight Night	Vienna, Austria	Decision	5	3:00
Fight was for the IKBO World Middleweight title.
2003-12-06	Loss	(Denmark) Ole Laursen	SuperLeague Netherlands 2003	Germany	Decision	5	3:00
2003-09-27	Win	(Japan) Akeomi Nitta	SuperLeague Germany 2003	Germany	Decision	5	3:00
2003-05-10	Win	(Japan) Takahiko Shimizu	SuperLeague Austria 2003	Vienna, Austria	Decision	5	3:00
2002-10-27	Win	(Belgium) Bjorn Marien	Vienna Fight Night	Vienna, Austria	Decision	5	3:00
2002-09-08	Loss	(Morocco) Nadir Lareche	The Fighting Party	Rotterdam, Netherlands	KO	5	
2002-05-24	Loss	(Morocco) Mohammed Ouali	Vienna Fight Night	Vienna, Austria	Decision (Split)	5	3:00
Fight was for the WKA Thaiboxing World Middleweight title.
2001-05	Win	(England) Eugene Valerio	Vienna Fight Night	Vienna, Austria	TKO (Referee stoppage)	2	
Wins WKA Thaiboxing European Middleweight title.
2000	Win			Vienna, Austria			
Wins WPKC Muay Thai World Middleweight title.
2000-01-26	Loss	(Belarus) Vasily Shish		Vienna, Austria	KO		
1997-11-15	Win			Austria			
Wins WPKL Junior World Super Welterweight title.
1996	Loss	(Morocco) Abdel Bchiri		Rabat, Morocco	Decision		
Legend: Win Loss Draw/No contest Notes
