= Hassan Naim =

Lebanese-Swiss biochemist

- Born: Beirut, Lebanon
- Education: University of Bern
- Occupation: Biochemist
- Years active: 1982–present

Hassan Naim is a Lebanese-Swiss biochemist. He currently works at the "Institut für Biochemie" (Institute for Biochemistry) at the University of Veterinary Medicine Hanover, while collaborating regularly with the University of Hannover.

== Scientific career ==
Hassan Naim received his Ph.D. degree in biochemistry from the University of Bern, Switzerland. Following appointments at the Biochemistry Department, University of Lausanne (membrane transport in T cells) and the University Children’s Hospital Bern (structure and function of brush border membrane proteins) he moved in 1989 to the Biochemistry Department, University of Texas Southwestern Medical Center at Dallas, USA to continue his work on structure-function relationships of brush border proteins. In 1991 he was recruited as a group leader and Faculty member at the University of Düsseldorf, Germany. In 1997 he was appointed as a Professor and Chair of the Department of Biochemistry at the University of Veterinary Medicine in Hannover, Germany.

== Current Research Interests ==
Current research interests in the Naim laboratory focus on the molecular mechanisms underlying protein trafficking, particularly polarized protein sorting in epithelial cells, in health and disease.

== Publications ==
Some of Naim's recent publications include (but are not limited to):

- Maalouf K, Jia J, Rizk S, Brogden G, Keiser M, Das A, Naim HY A modified lipid composition in Fabry disease leads to an intracellular block of the detergent-resistant membrane-associated dipeptidyl peptidase IV
- Sim L, Willemsma C, Mohan S, Naim HY, Pinto BM, Rose DR Structural basis for substrate selectivity in human maltase-glucoamylase and sucrase-isomaltase N-terminal domains
- Krahn MP, Rizk S, Alfalah M, Behrendt M, Naim HY Protocadherin of the liver, kidney and colon associates with detergent-resistant membranes during cellular differentiation
- Zimmer KP, Fischer I, Mothes T, Weissen-Plenz G, Schmitz M, Wieser H, Mendez E, Buening J, Lerch MM, Ciclitira PC, Weber P, Naim HY Endocytotic Segregation of Gliadin Peptide 31-49 in Enterocytes
- Behrendt M, Polaina J, Naim HY Structural hierarchy of regulatory elements in the folding and transport of an intestinal multi-domain protein
