= Hussein Naim =

Lebanese-Swiss biochemist and molecular virologist

- Born: Beirut, Lebanon
- Education: University of Bern
- Occupation: Molecular virologist
- Years active: 1989–present

Hussein Naim is a Lebanese-Swiss biochemist and molecular virologist, known for his research in cell biology (membrane protein sorting and internalization) and virology (measles, SARS, HIV and Influenza). He has held several leading positions at prominent universities and biotechnology centers.

== Scientific career ==
Hussein Naim received his Ph.D. degree in biochemistry from the University of Bern, Switzerland in 1989. After being appointed at the University of Texas Southwestern Medical Center at Dallas, his research focused on the (i) basis of enveloped viruses assembly, and (ii) the mechanisms of membrane protein sorting and endocytosis in polarized epithelial cells. His research was instrumental towards understanding the intracellular mechanisms of viral and membrane protein sorting in epithelial cells and the cell-surface assembly of several RNA viruses. He was appointed as a faculty member at the institute of molecular biology of the University of Zurich. His research focused on the development of novel viral vectors and therapeutic molecules that paved the way towards translational research (live recombinant vaccines and cancer virotherapy). Later, he became the director of vaccine research at Berna Biotech (now Crucell).

== Publications ==
- Characteristics of the internalization signal in the Y543 influenza virus hemagglutinin suggest a model for recognition of internalization signals containing tyrosine. J. Biol. Chem. 269, 3928-3933
- Apical and basolateral coated pits of MDCK cells differ in their rates of maturation into coated vesicles, but not in the ability to distinguish between hemagglutinin proteins with different internalization signals. J. Cell Biol. 129, 1241–1250.
- Mutations in the Middle of the Transmembrane Domain Reverse the Polarity of Transport of the Influenza Virus Hemagglutinin in MDCK Epithelial Cells. J. Cell Biol. 142, 51–57.
- Tyrosine-based Membrane Protein Sorting Signals Are Differentially Interpreted by Polarized Madin-Darby Canine Kidney and LLC-PK1 Epithelial Cells. J. Biol. Chem. 273, 26862-26869
- O-linked glycans mediate apical sorting of human intestinal sucrase-isomaltase through association with lipid rafts. Current Biology 9, 593–596.
- Effects of altering palmitylation sites on the biosynthesis and function of the Influenza virus Hemagglutinin. J. Virol. 66, 7585–7588.
- Basis for selective incorporation of glycoproteins into influenza virus envelope. J. Virol. 67, 4831-4841
- Measles Viruses with Altered Envelope Protein Cytoplasmic Tails Gain Cell Fusion Competence.J. Virol. 72, 1224–1234.
- Chimeric Measles Viruses with a Foreign Envelope. J. Virol. 72, 2150–2159.
- Gene Transfer into Neurons from Hippocampal Slices. Mol. Cell. Neurosci. 17, 855-871
- Measles virus spreads in rat hippocampal neurons by cell-to-cell contact and in a polarized fashion. J. Virol. 76, 5720–5728.
- Oncolytic measles virus in cutaneous T-cell lymphomas mount anti-tumor immune responses in vivo and target interferon resistant tumor cells. Blood, 106: 2287–2294.
- Use of viral vectors for the development of vaccines. Exp. Rev. Vaccines, 6 (2): 255–266.
- Reverse genetics of measles virus and resulting multivalent recombinant vaccines. Curr. Topics Microbiol. Immun. 329, 129–162.
- Measles virus matrix protein specifies apical virus release and glycoprotein sorting in epithelial cells. EMBO J. 19, 3576-3585
