= Tarafa Baghajati =

Syrian activist

- طرفة بغجاتي
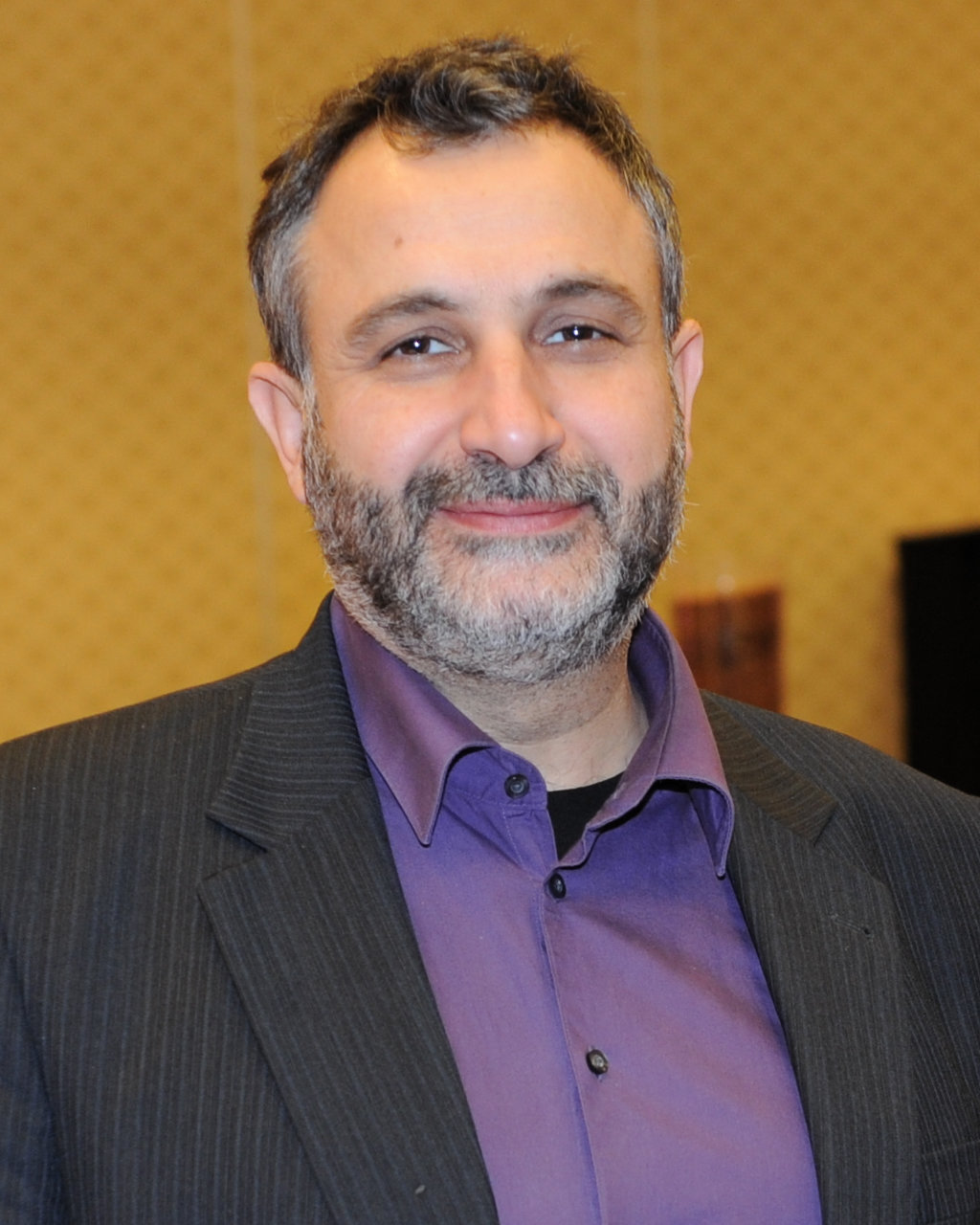
- Tarafa Baghajati in Vienna, Austria, December 2011.
- Born: September 1, 1961 (age 64); Damascus, Syria

Tarafa Baghajati (Arabic: طرفة بغجاتي, born September 1, 1961) is a Syrian-born, Austrian Muslim activist and writer. He is a founding member of the Islamic group "Initiative muslimischer ÖsterreicherInnen" (IMÖ). He has lived in Vienna, Austria since 1986.

== Life ==
Tarafa Baghajati was born in Damascus, Syria, to parents Adnan Baghajati, an author and former Syrian Education minister, and Amal Homsi, an economic journalist.

In 1984 the Syrian government detained Baghajati for more than eight months. He spent three of them in Tadmor Prison due to his political views.

In 1999, he founded the Islamic advocacy group Initiative muslimischer ÖsterreicherInnen (IMÖ) with his wife Carla Amina Baghajati, Omar Al-Rawi, Mouddar Khouja and Andrea Saleh, who are members of the Muslim religious community in Austria.

Baghajati is a former board member (2001–2007, 2004–2007 Vice-President) and member of the Honorary Advisory Board of European Network Against Racism (ENAR) He is also a board member of the Platform for Intercultural Europe (PIE).

Baghajati is one of the founders and a board member of European Muslim Initiative for Social Cohesion (EMISCO).

== Activism ==
=== Female genital mutilation ===
Tarafa Baghajati has stated his opposition and rejection of the practice of female genital mutilation (FGM) in Africa and Europe and called to prevent it.

In March 2009, Rüdiger Nehberg and Tarafa Baghajati met Sheikh Yusuf al-Qaradawi in Qatar, a well known and controversial Sunni Islamic scholar. They obtained a fatwa issued by the recognized legal scholars, stating the genital mutilation of girls is referred to and forbidden as "devil's work" because it is directed against the ethics of Islam. Speaking at the Hamburg Museum of Ethnology, 6 February 2011 Baghajati ventured to predict to celebrate the end of this practice as early as 2020.

In February 2011, Rüdiger Nehberg and Tarafa Baghajati met Sheikh Mohamed Said Ramadan Al-Bouti and obtained a similar fatwa against female genital mutilation.

In September 2012, Rüdiger Nehberg and Tarafa Baghajati met Sudanese Sheikh Hassan al-Turabi and obtained a similar statement opposing female genital mutilation.

=== Muslim Immigration and Muslim rights in Europe ===
Since moving to Austria in 1986, Baghajati has been active on the topics of immigration, anti-racism, human rights and political issues which involve the Middle East especially his home country of Syria. He is also active on the topics of Islam and Muslims in Austria and Europe, such as promoting Muslim women's rights relating to the headscarf and opposition to what he perceives to be Islamophobia through legal recognition to combat anti-Islamic prejudice. On 23 February 2015 he spoke at RT, and expressed his concern at the rise of Islamophobia in Europe. On 24 June 2015, Tarafa called for the Muslim community to be more engaged in European Policy.

=== Geert Wilders Case ===
On 28 July 2015, Wilders gave a speech in Vienna at the invitation of FPÖ-Chef H. C. Strache in which he compared the Qu'ran to Mein Kampf. Vienna's prosecutors' office lodged calls for criminal proceedings following Baghajati legal claim accusing Wilders of hate speech, suggesting the Qu'ran endorses terrorism and for 'denigrating religious teachings'.

=== The Syrian Revolution ===
Since the Syrian Conflict started in 2011, Baghajati publishes articles concerning the situation in Syria, mostly in Al-Hayat, and in Al-Quds Al-Arabi.

Tarafa Baghajati is against the government of Bashar al-Assad and supports "a pluralistic and democratic view of Syria". He warns in his articles of the confessional tension in Syria and in the Islamic countries, especially between Sunni and Shia.

On May 6, 2014 Baghajati stated in a conference his strong opinion against European Muslims travelling to fight in Syria.

== Education ==
Baghajati graduated as civil engineer from Polytechnic University of Timișoara in 1986

== Awards ==
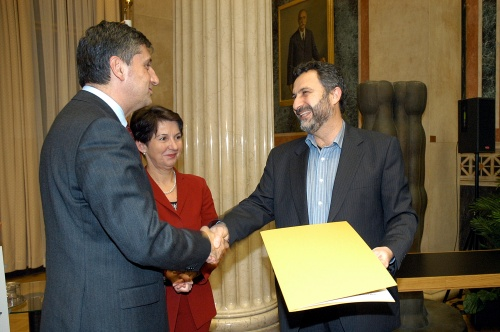
Tarafa Baghajati received the award in 2008

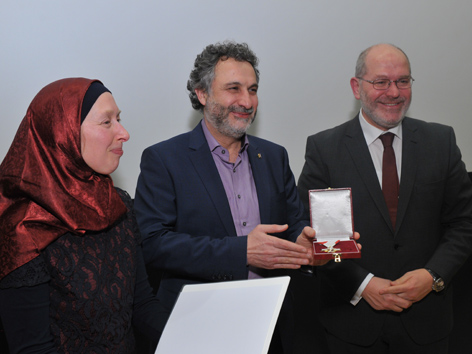
In February 2016 Tarafa received the Golden Medal of the Province of Vienna

The Muslim Austrian Initiative (IMOE) won democracy award by Margaretha Lupac Stiftung in 2008.

In February 2016 Tarafa received the Golden Medal of the Province of Vienna at the event 10 years of Muslim commitment against Female genital mutation (FGM).

== Personal life ==
He has been married to Carla Amina Baghajati since 1990 and has four children.
