= Immigration to Austria =

Immigration in Austria refers to the movement of foreign nationals to Austria for residence. Shaped by its position in Central Europe and proximity to the Eastern Bloc, Austria has experienced successive migration waves including Cold War refugees, guest workers from Turkey and Yugoslavia, and asylum seekers during the 2015 refugee crisis. As of 2024, approximately 27.8% of Austria's population has a migrant background, one of the highest proportions in the European Union. Among foreign citizens residing in Austria, slightly more than half hold citizenship of an EU or EFTA country. Since Austria joined the EU in 1995, residents of member states have benefited from freedom of movement and the right to work in other member states. The EU enlargements of 2004 and 2007 further increased migration from Central and Eastern Europe, which now account for the majority of EU citizens in Austria.

== History ==
=== After World War II ===
==== Cold War Refugees (1956–1968) ====
Due to Austria's geographic position near the Eastern Bloc and its political neutrality, a significant number of refugees and approximately 250,000 Jewish migrants arrived between 1945 and 1989 from these states, most of whom migrated onwards to the United States, Israel and other Western nations.

Following the Soviet suppression of the 1956 Hungarian Revolution, Austria provided first asylum to approximately 180,000 refugees from Hungary, of whom around 20,000 remained in Austria. After the Prague Spring of 1968, approximately 162,000 Czechoslovaks entered Austria, though most continued to other destinations. The Solidarity movement in Poland in 1981 and 1982 prompted another inflow of approximately 150,000 refugees. In response, the Austrian government introduced visa requirements, significantly reducing the number of subsequent asylum applications.

==== Guest Worker Period (1960s–1970s) ====
The post-war economic boom in Austria increased the demand for domestic labor. Following the example of other central European countries, Austria shifted its immigration policy and implemented agreements with Turkey (1964) and Yugoslavia (1966) to recruit workers and their families and relocate them to Austria. By 1973, the number of foreign workers reached 227,000, of which the majority came from Yugoslavia. The guest worker system originated in the 1961 "Raab-Olah Agreement" between the trade union federation and the chamber of commerce, which established annual quotas for foreign workers and was based on a rotation principle (Rotationsprinzip) in which workers were expected to return to their home countries after a few years, and no integration policies were developed. Following the 1973 oil crisis, Austria froze recruitment and passed the Aliens Employment Act (1975); however, migration continued through family reunification.

=== 1980–present ===
==== Yugoslav Wars (1990s) ====
After the outbreak of the war in Yugoslavia in 1991, approximately 86,500 refugees arrived in Austria between 1992 and 1995, representing 1.1% of the country's population. Unlike earlier mass refugee events, Austria did not encourage emigration to third countries. Initially, refugees received temporary protected status with limited labor market access; however, from 1995 Austria granted Bosnian nationals unlimited access to its labor market. After the Dayton Agreement in 1995, Austria, unlike Germany, did not insist on mass repatriation but allowed refugees to remain if they could prove employment. Their integration was facilitated by the presence of existing guest worker communities from the former Yugoslavia.

==== 2015 Refugee Crisis ====
In 2015, Austria was among the European countries most affected by the refugee crisis, receiving approximately 88,000 asylum applications, corresponding to about 1% of its population, thereby ranking as the EU's fourth-largest recipient of asylum seekers that year. The majority of applicants came from Syria, Afghanistan, and Iraq, which together accounted for 71% of all claims. Survey research found that refugees arriving in late 2015 consisted mainly of young families with educational attainment considerably higher than the average in their countries of origin: over half of Syrian and Iraqi respondents had completed at least upper secondary education, and approximately one quarter held post-secondary qualifications. Researchers have argued that Austria's multi-level governance framework, which assigned reception responsibilities to the provinces while largely excluding municipalities from formal decision-making, proved inadequate for the scale of arrivals and generated significant intergovernmental tensions. Civil society organizations supplemented state-provided accommodation and integration services. Public opinion polls showed declining support for refugee admission throughout 2015. This shift contributed to the asylum issue dominating subsequent elections and a government coalition change from center-left to center-right with far-right participation in 2017.

== Immigration regulations ==
=== Rot-Weiß-Rot-Karte ===
In 2011, Austria introduced the Rot-Weiß-Rot-Karte (Red-White-Red Card), a criteria-based points system enabling qualified migration from third countries. The system distinguishes between three categories of migrants: highly qualified individuals, who may enter on a six-month visa to seek employment; skilled workers in officially designated shortage occupations; and other key workers, who must demonstrate that no equally qualified domestic worker is available. Points are awarded based on qualifications, prospective income, professional experience, age, and language proficiency. The card is initially valid for one year; holders may subsequently apply for a Rot-Weiß-Rot-Karte plus granting unrestricted labour market access, and after five years for permanent residence. The initiative emerged from negotiations between Austria's social partners, with employers seeking expanded access to qualified labour while trade unions secured passage of the Lohn- und Sozialdumping-Bekämpfungsgesetz (Act against Wage and Social Dumping) in exchange for their support.

=== Naturalization ===
Austrian citizenship law, governed by the Staatsbürgerschaftsgesetz of 1985, is among the most restrictive in the European Union. Naturalization generally requires ten years of continuous legal residence, including at least five years with a permanent residence permit, though this period may be reduced to six years for EEA citizens or applicants demonstrating exceptional personal and professional integration. Applicants must demonstrate German language proficiency, pass a citizenship test on Austrian history and democratic principles, prove stable income over 36 months within the preceding six years, and—with limited exceptions—renounce their previous citizenship, as Austria substantially restricts dual citizenship. The naturalization rate peaked at approximately six percent in 2003, after which Austria tightened its citizenship requirements in 2005. In 2019, parliament unanimously adopted an amendment permitting descendants of victims of National Socialist persecution to acquire Austrian citizenship by declaration without renouncing their existing nationality.

== Demographics ==
As of 2024, about 2.5 million or 27.8% of people living in Austria had a migrant background. Of these, approximately 1.875 million were first-generation migrants, while around 634,000 belonged to the second generation (born in Austria to foreign-born parents). Overall, the Austrian population grew by around 1.686 million persons through migration since the 1960s. In 1961, migrants made up only around 1.4% of the total population. The largest groups of foreign nationals in Austria are citizens of Germany, Romania, Turkey, Serbia, Hungary, Croatia, Syria and Bosnia-Herzegovina. Citizens of EU member states account for 37.8% of all migrants, and 24.5% have their origin in the former Yugoslav republics (excluding the EU member states Slovenia and Croatia). The foreign-born population is unevenly distributed across the country. Vienna has the highest share, with 40.9% of residents having a migration background. The proportion is considerably lower in rural areas and western provinces.

Austria has one of the highest shares of foreign-born residents in the European Union. Approximately 22.5% of Austria's population was born abroad, placing it behind Luxembourg, Malta, Cyprus and Ireland.
