= Omar Hamdi (artist) =

Omar Hamdi "Malva"
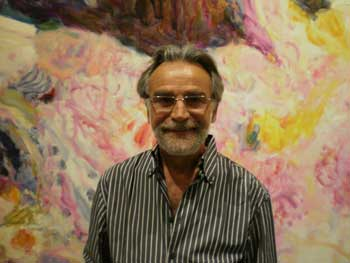
- Born: 1952 Tell Nayif, Al-Hasakah Governorate, Syria
- Died: 18 October 2015 (aged 62–63) Vienna, Austria
- Occupation: Painter

Omar Hamdi (1952–2015), known as Malva, was a Syrian Kurdish artist who lived and worked in Vienna, Austria.

== Biography ==
Omar Hamdi was born in 1952 in Al-Hasakah, Syria. He worked as a graphic artist for the Syrian press, where he also wrote articles on an artistic criticism. He settled in Vienna in 1978 and was awarded Austrian nationality. He was a member of the General Federation of Austrian Artists, and a member of the Künstlerhaus – Wien.

Hamdi's works are widely exhibited in art galleries, including the Arnot Gallery in New York, which acted as a representative gallery for his works.

His works are acquired by art collectors and dealers, art galleries and exhibitions, museums, banks and Ministries of Culture.

Many of his works have been printed as postcards and posters by several publishing houses and are distributed in several countries.

His life was devoted to full-time artistic work.

== Death ==
Hamdi died in Vienna on 18 October 2015.

== Selected exhibitions ==
=== One-man exhibitions ===
- 1976–1977 – People's Art Hall at Damascus, National Museum of Aleppo.
- 1987 -Vienna, Palffy Palace "Art Salon"
- 1989 – Vienna, Austrian Central Bank; Art Gallery Chicago; Lyzon Art Gallery Tennessee, Nashville; Gallery Kral, San Francisco; Gallery Arnot, New York; Gallery Ambassador, New York.
- 1990 – Gallery L'Atelier, Vienna; Gallery Celeste, Vienna; Art House, Göttingen, Germany.
- 1991 – Gallery Frankenstein, Berlin.
- 1992 – Wally Findlay Galleries, New York and Paris.
- 1993 – Gallery Art Forum, International Contemporary Art, Vienna; AI-Sayed Art Gallery/Assad Library, Damascus.
- 1994–1998 – Wally Findlay Galleries, New York, Chicago, Palm Beach, Florida.
- 2000 – Green Art Gallery – Dubai.
- 2000 – Wally Findlay Gallery – Palm Beach. 2002 – Rochan Gallery – Jeddah.

=== Group exhibitions ===
- 1980–1992 – Exhibitions of the General Federation of Austrian Artists, in Austria and abroad.
- 1985 – World Exhibition of the United Nations Office, Vienna.
- 1989 – Art Festival Messepalast, Vienna; The First Arab Art Festival; Art House, Göttingen, Germany.
- 1985–1993 – The Annual World Art Fair, Frankfurt, Germany.
- 1989 – International Fair of Contemporary Arts (Madrid Arco 89), Spain.
- 1990 – International Fair of Contemporary Arts (Milano EXPO 90), Italy.
- 1991 – Art Jonction International, Nice, France.
- 1992 – Bolognafiere (Contemporary Art Festival), Bologna, Italy; Auro Art, Verona; Künstlerhaus, Graz; EXPO Sevilla, Spain; Friendship and Peace Festival, Latakia, Syria.
- 1993 – International Fair of Contemporary Art (Budapest Art Expo 93). *1993 – Gallery Breitenbach, Una, Germany.
- 1994–1997 – International Art Fair, Frankfurt, Germany; Second International Festival of Sharjah.
- 1999 – Informelle Tendenzen im "Künstlerhaus", Vienna.
- 2001 – Cairo, Biennale.
- 2001 – Artuell, Beirut / Atassi Gallery Damas 2002.
- 2002 – History Museum Vienna – Rathaus / New York Art Fair.
- 2003 – National Museum Cracow, Poland.
- 2003-Tehran Museum of Modern Arts
- 2004 Art NY – USA

== Bibliography ==
- "Malva" Omar Hamdi, Life and Color, in Arabic, Damascus, 1976.by Janet Hanna Korkiss
- "Malva" Omar Hamdi, Life and Work, in German, Vienna 1987, by Dr. S. Kaiser.
- Malva, A Critical Study, in English and German by Nikolai Meikofski, published in 1991 by the Art Gallery, New York.
- Malva, Impressionist Works, in English, published by Gallery Arnot, New York, 1991; in German by Gallery L'Atelier, A Critical and Analytical Study by Andre Manzano.
- Malva, Omar Hamdi, 20 years of Oil Painting, Art Forum, Vienna, 1994.
- Bachar – Malva, Atlas Production, 1992, in French and English, for the Bolognafiere, Italy. – Dictionary of World Artistic Criticism, 1999 in English, Flash Art Publishing.
- International Directory of Arts, Galleries and Museums, 1991–1992, in German, Art Address, Frankfurt.
- Several wall annual Calendars and exhibition-catalogues.
- A Volume of 12 Paintings, published by the International Aid Organization in Venice, Italy, Comune di Padova, Progetto Giovanni, 1992.
