= Nadja Maleh =

Austrian actress (born 1972)

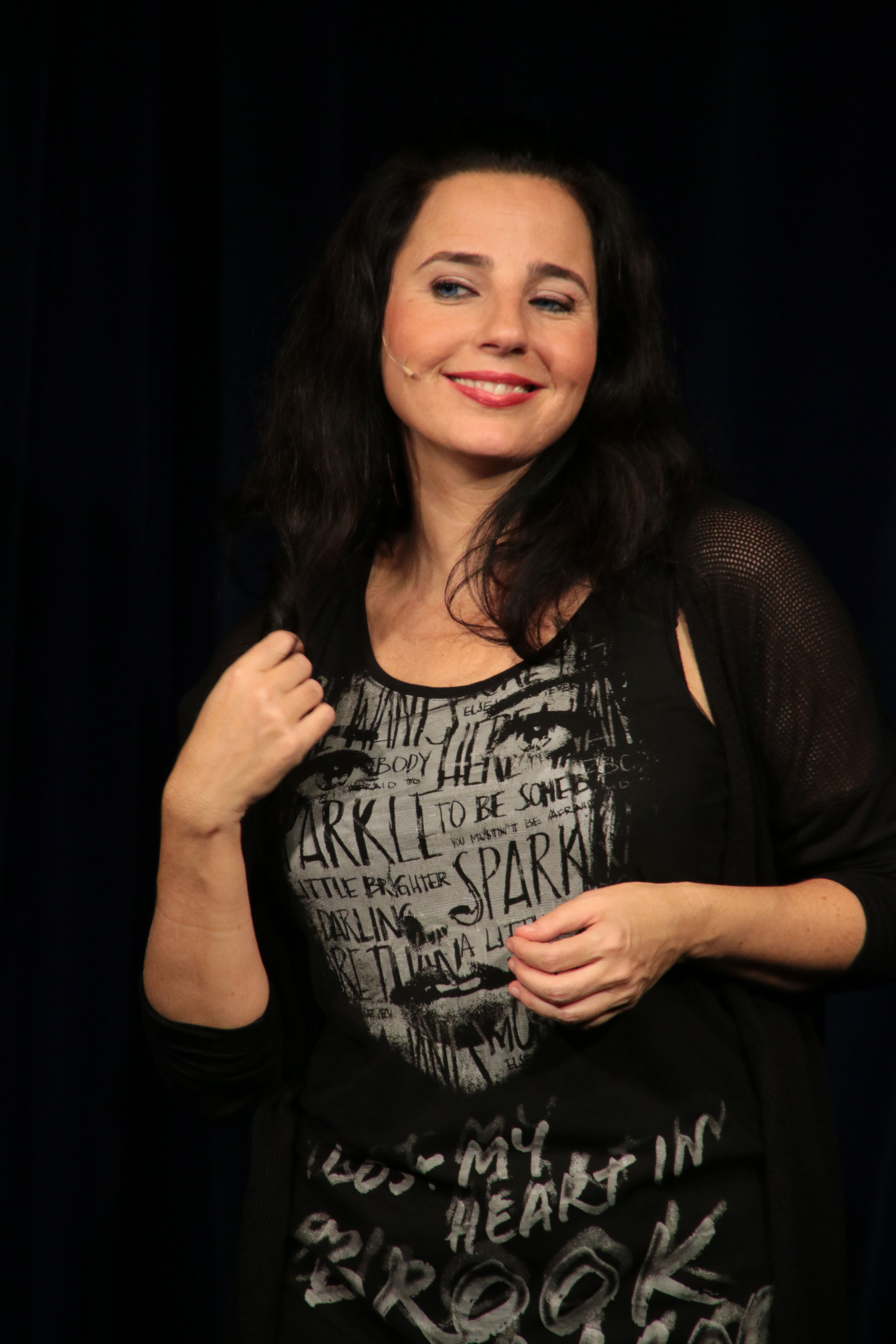
- Maleh in her solo cabaret program Placebo at Scharfrichterhaus in Passau, Germany, October 2015
- Born: 9 June 1972 (age 54); Vienna, Austria

Nadja Maleh (born 9 June 1972 in Vienna) is an Austrian actress, singer, cabaret artist and director.

== Early life ==
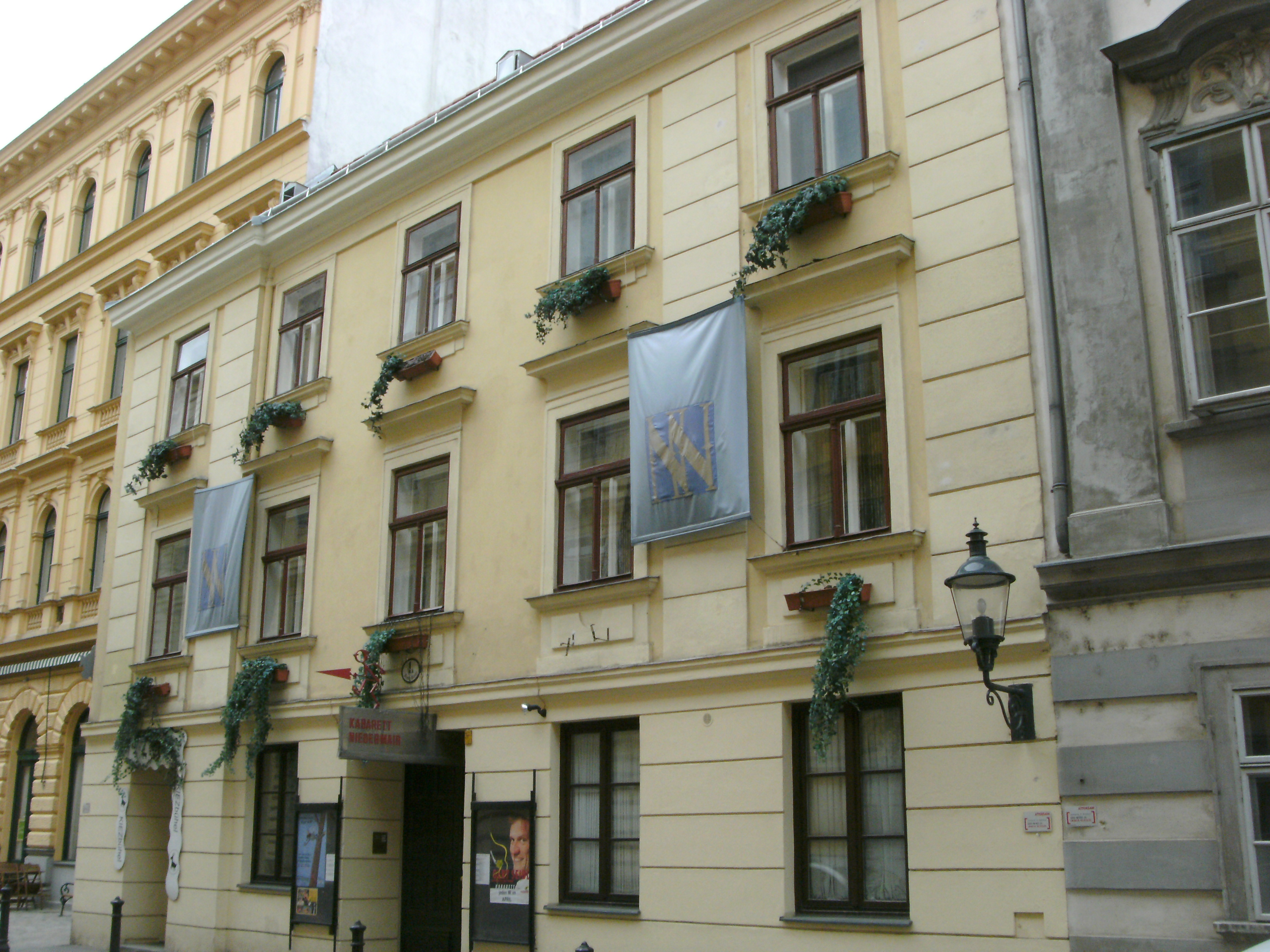
The Kabarett Niedermair

Maleh was born 1972 in Vienna to a Syrian father who is a physician and an Austrian mother from Tyrol who is a psychotherapist and the President of Doctors Without Borders Austria. After attending a secondary academic school with modern languages in Vienna from 1982 to 1990, she studied drama with Michael Mohapp at the Graumann Acting Musical Entertainment Studio (GAMES) theatre school at the Graumann Theatre in Vienna until 1994. In the same year she completed a training course at the "International Studio for Movement Theatre at the Odeon". She has been taking voice lessons since 1998.

Maleh's first solo show – Flugangsthasen – premièred at "Kabarett Niedermair" in Vienna on 8 March 2007, while her second stage show was entitled Radio Aktiv (première: 4 February 2010, "Kabarett Niedermair"). Her third solo show – Jackpot – had its première at Vienna's "Stadtsaal" on 24 January 2013. Maleh has been performing Placebo, her fourth solo show which premièred at the "Kulisse" in Vienna, since 10 February 2015. Her début album SONGS VOL 1 featuring numbers from her cabaret shows was released at the same time. Parallel to her activities as a member of the ensemble of the Grünwald Friday comedy on Bavarian Broadcasting, the cabaret artist has also appeared in several TV productions on the stations Puls 4 and Servus TV since the beginning of 2016. On 27 September 2016 she started her revised edition of BEST-OF Kabarett together with Bernd Alfons (guitar). In March 2026 she will be debuting a new cabaret solo titled "Zuckergoscherl".

== Cabaret show characters ==
Her main theme, "Ich bin viele – und die wollen alle raus" ("I am many personalities, all yearning to escape") forms the basis of Maleh's solo cabaret shows. She has created a total of 25 fictitious characters for her cabaret shows to date. The most important are:

- Ramona Krummelanke, Nadja Maleh's oldest character, was created for "Die Wochenshow" on German TV channel Sat.1 in the year 2001. With her Saxon accent, Ramona had a place in every solo show. Ramona first appeared as a clown performing conjuring tricks in "Placebo".
- The characters of the quick-witted Indian Mandala, her grandmother Ganga and husband Murti made their first appearance in "Flugangsthasen" in the year 2007. Mandala speaks English with an Indian accent and is remembered mainly for her distinctive laughter.
- Also since "Flugangsthasen", the old lady, Frau Professor Huber, mathematician and physicist, has discussed important topics of everyday life with scientific meticulousness and subtle humour.
- Leila is an immigration assistant at a German language school (ever since "Flugangsthasen"), speaks with an Arab accent, and is against xenophobia and racism, showing typically Oriental facial expressions and gestures.
- Tante Melanie (also Melanie B.) is a shrewd kindergarten teacher with a Burgenland-Styrian accent. The audience is her "kindergarten", and a male member of the audience usually becomes the butt of Melanie's jokes. This interactive role was first encountered in "Radio Aktiv" in the year 2010.
- Olga the Russian has also been featured since "Radio Aktiv". Amongst other things, she represents the standpoint that the first woman – "Jeva" – must have been a Russian. Only a Russian woman, she asserts, would have been capable of imagining herself in paradise naked and with half an apple in her hand.
- Celine (formerly Claudette) explains everything about love to her audiences with French charm, accent and chansons (also since "Radio Aktiv").
- Dragan is an anti-drug street worker and rapper who put in his first appearance in 2015 in the most recent solo show "Placebo". He speaks perfect German but has decided to speak with a Balkan accent (original: fachkanakisch) so as to be more easily understood by young people. The highlight of his performances is the "Neurotransmitta Rap".

== Cabaret ==
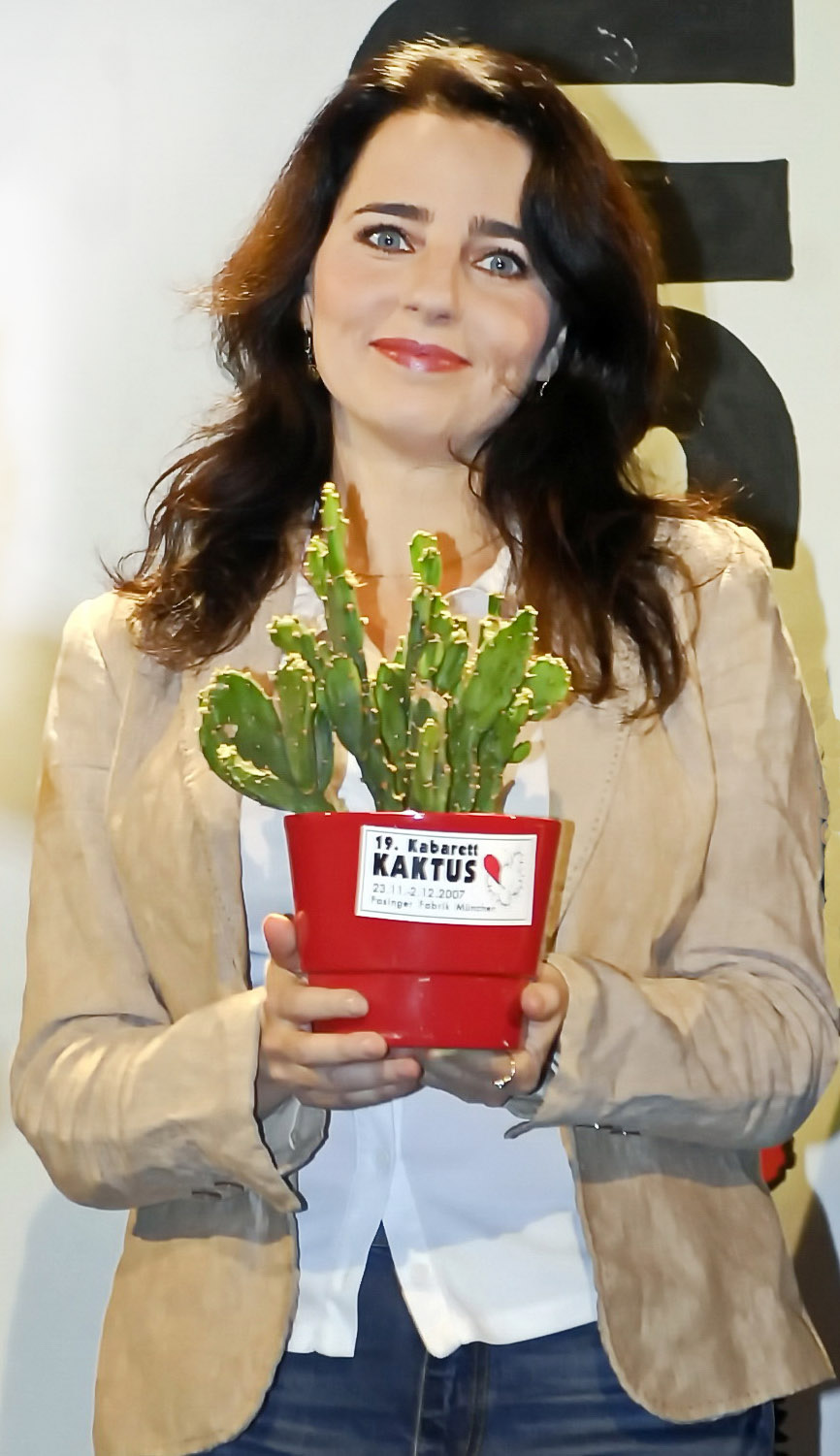
Maleh pictured with her trophy for the Munich Cabaret Cactus 2007

- "Lachen bis zum Schluss", cabaret at the Graumann Theatre, directed by: Michael Mohapp, 1993/1994
- "Frauen jenseits des Nervenzusammenbruchs", together with Valerie Bolzano, directed by: Andy Hallwaxx, 1997, 1998 and 1999
- "Space Girls", together with Valerie Bolzano, directed by: Andy Hallwaxx, 1998, 1999 and 2000
- "Laute(r) Stars", comedy show, Kulisse Wien, 2004
- "Mitten am Rand", Cabaret Simpl Vienna, 2004/2005
- "One Night Stand – Die Comedy Show", comedy show, 2008, with Stefan Haider and Michael Schuller
- "Hyundai Kabarett-Tage" (Hyundai Cabaret Days), 2012 and 2014
- "Wiener Kabarett Festival" (Viennese Cabaret Festival), 2011, 2013, 2015 and 2017

== Solo cabaret programs ==
- 2008: Flugangsthasen, directed by Marion Dimali
- 2010: Radio aktiv, directed by Marion Dimali
- 2013: Jackpot, directed by Marion Dimali
- 2014: Start of BEST-OF cabaret, excerpts from her solo cabaret programmes as a separate show continually updated with the latest sketches.
- 2015: Placebo directed by Marion Dimali
- 2016: BEST-OF Kabarett, revised edition, directed by Marion Dimali
- 2026: Zuckergoscherl

== Television (selection) ==
- "SAT.1 Wochenshow", 2001/2002
- "Österreich sucht den Comedy Star", jury member casting show, ATV+, 2003/2004
- "Absolut genial – Die Comedy Arena" (Absolutely Brilliant – The Comedy Arena), Austrian version of "Genial Daneben", ATV+, 2005
- "Gott sei dank ... dass Sie da sind!" (improvisational comedy), 2006/2007
- "Ex", Austrian Broadcasting Corporation series, 2008
- "Oben Ohne", Austrian Broadcasting Corporation series, 2008/2009
- ORF Summer Cabaret 2011
- "B Team – The Magazine", moderation, Austrian Broadcasting Corporation, 2011
- "Grünwald Friday Comedy", comedy show (ensemble), Bavarian Television, 2010, 2011, 2012, and 2014, 2015 and 2016
- "Die Comedyfabrik – jetzt fängt die Woche gut an", comedy show, Puls 4, from 30 November 2015
- "Zum Brüller! – Der Komedy Klub", mockumentary, Servus TV, from 11 February 2016
- "Bist du deppert! Steuerverschwendung und andere Frechheiten" ("Are you crazy! Tax wasting and other insolences"), political satirical cabaret series, 3rd season, 2016, Puls 4

== Film (selection) ==
The Goldfish, Nadja Maleh as Charlie Chaplin

- "Love at First Touch", by Friedrich Zorn, 2001
- "Poem to be Translated", short film by Frederick Baker, 2002
- "Summer with the Ghosts", children's cinema film, 2002
- "Schön, dass es dich gibt", directed by: Reinhard Schwabenitzky, Austrian Broadcasting Corporation, 2005
- "Conny und die verschwundene Ehefrau", directed by: Reinhard Schwabenitzky, Austrian Broadcasting Corporation, 2005
- Crazy Race 3 – Sie knacken jedes Schloss, directed by: Axel Sand, RTL, 2005
- "The Goldfish", silent film (role of Charlie Chaplin), directed by: Sandra Öhl-Wögerbauer, 2006
- "Die ProSieben Märchenstunde: Rotkäppchen - Wege zum Glück", fairytale comedy, Austrian Broadcasting Corporation/Pro7, 2006

== Theatre (selection) ==
- "Der Lockruf der Bahnhofsmission", directed by: Marion Dimali, 1992
- "Ruhe! Wir stürzen ab", directed by: Michael Niavarani, 1993
- "Mandragola", directed by: Andy Hallwaxx, 1993
- "Kaiser Josef und die Bahnwärtertochter", directed by: Andy Hallwaxx, 1994
- "Single mit 4 Frauen", directed by: I Stangl, 2011
- "Augustin", rock musical, directed by: Manfred Tauchen, première on 9 August 2012 at the Stadtsaal in Vienna, roles: Henriette Pest, Frau Cholera, 1. Wäschermädel
- "Tankstelle der Verdammten", a "lousy"operetta by Georg Ringsgwandl, translated into Viennese by Thomas Maurer, directed by: Gabi Rothmüller, première on 17 August 2016 at the Stadtsaal in Vienna

== Work as a director (selection) ==
- 2009: "Cinema & Comedy", with Gidon Kremer & Kremerata Baltica, Aleksey Igudesman, Hyung-ki Joo
- 2009: "Plan B", with Stefan Haider, cabaret programme
- 2010: "Ärztlich Willkommen", with Alex Kristan and Roman Szeliga, cabaret programme
- 2012: "5 nach 12", with Stefan Haider, cabaret programme
- 2013: "shake it baby", with Stefan Haider, cabaret programme
- 2015: "Sexy Jesus", with Stefan Haider, cabaret programme
- 2016: "Free Jazz", with Stefan Haider, cabaret programme
- 2017: "Reporter ohne Grenzen", with Peter Klien, cabaret programme

== Audio ==
- 2012: "Im Namen meines Körpers", by Heba El Afifi. The author describes people's wishes and hopes in this book. Reflections as well as everyday situations of young men and women in Egypt in the form of monologues and dialogues. A selection of the texts from this book have been recorded in Arabic in Cairo and in German in Vienna. Nadja Maleh is involved in the production of an audio CD. AlbertVera Verlag, Vienna, ISBN 978-3-9503164-1-4

== Awards ==
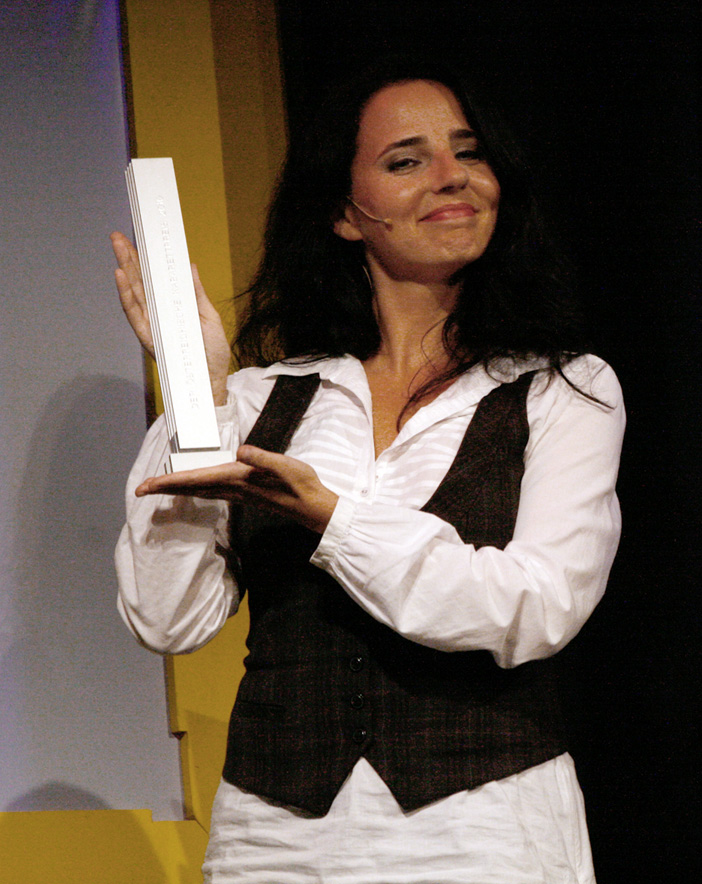
Nadja Maleh with her Austrian Cabaret Award trophy 2010

- 2007: Winner of the Munich Cabaret Cactus
- 2008: Winner of the "Burgdorfer Krönung"
- 2008: Silver Passau Scharfrichterbeil
- 2009: Paulaner Solo Cabaret Prize (1st place and audience award)
- 2010: Finalist in Tuttlinger Krähe (2nd prize)
- 2010: Austrian Cabaret Award (grant)
