= Adnan Ibrahim =

Palestinian Islamic scholar (born 1966)

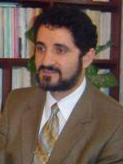
- Ibrahim in his private library
- Born: 2 May 1966 (age 60); Gaza, Palestine

Education
- Education: University of Vienna

Philosophical work
- School: Sunni
- Main interests: Philosophy; Ethics; Science; Islam; Atheism
- Website: www.adnanibrahim.net

Adnan Ibrahim is a Palestinian Islamic scholar who holds a master's and a PhD in Arabic studies from the University of Vienna.

== Life ==
Adnan Ibrahim was born and brought up in a refugee camp in Gaza/Palestine. He later moved to Yugoslavia and studied medicine in Sarajevo. In the 1990s he moved to Vienna because of the Bosnian War, where he became Imam of the Shura mosque in Leopoldstadt in 2002. He holds Austrian citizenship.

His preaching in Arabic reaches a wide audience through digital media.

According to Raphael Israeli, "After the London bombings in 2005, he issued a fatwa saying Muslims who hear of plans for a terrorist attack must report them to the police immediately." He has preached and lectured against female genital mutilation.

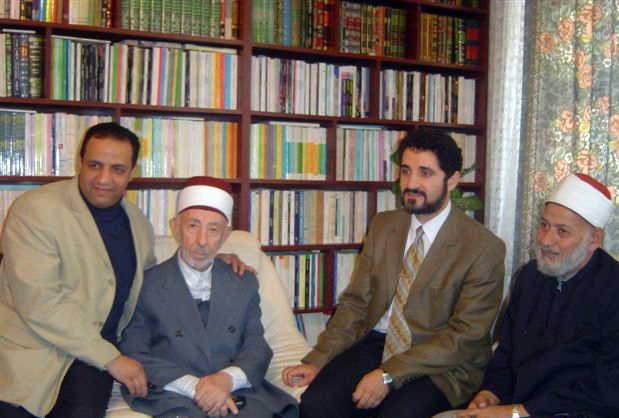
Dr.Adnan ibrahim.

== Controversy ==
=== Controversy within the Muslim Community ===
Ibrahim is one of the most controversial Muslim scholars. Conservative Muslims, especially Wahhabies, consider him as misguided and as having incorrect views about Islam and accuse him of spreading "sedition" in the Muslim community. Some even went as far as calling him "Kaffir" and "Rafidi" (although he's publicly Sunni). He also has been accused of trying to change Islam to fit the Western agenda. These controversies are mostly due to his following an Islamic modernism approach and rejection to some points in Islam regarding women's rights and what he considers as "violence."

=== Controversy in the West ===
In 2007 Austrian media described him as a controversial figure: liberal in theology and opposing terrorism in Europe, his preaching on Middle Eastern politics has praised anti-Israeli militants and led to accusations of supporting Hamas against Israel. Called an "enlightened and reforming imam by one commentator, particularly with regard to women's issues," in 2014 he again reportedly preached in support of Hamas, although the accuracy of the translation was called into question.

During a speech at the Strasbourg Islamic center, a video of which was posted on the internet in January 2011 (as translated by MEMRI), Ibrahim claimed that Nicolaus Copernicus had actually stolen ideas from the Arab Islamic astronomer Abu Al-Hasan Ibn Al-Shatir, he is not the only scholar to suggest this. Ibrahim claimed that "a Polish prime minister" when on a visit to Syria, supposedly admitted this to the president Hafez al-Assad. He also claimed that other western scientists, including Galileo Galilei, Tycho Brahe, Johannes Kepler, and Leonardo da Vinci were actually "thieves...who robbed the Islamic heritage, which was kept in the darkness of church crypts for over 200 years."Ibrahim also claimed that Muslim scientist Baha Al-Amili had developed a formula for "perpetual energy" and created lighting in a mosque in the city of Isfahan that burned indefinitely without any energy source.
