= Venezuelans =

People of Venezuela

Venezuelans Venezolanos

Total population
- c. 33.5 million Diaspora c. 7.89 million 0.44% of world's population

Regions with significant populations
- Venezuela 28,199,867 (2021)
- Colombia: 2,820,000
- Peru: 1,662,889
- United States: 1,168,271 (2024)
- Chile: 728,586 (2023)
- Brazil: 626,885 (2024)
- Spain: 518,918 (2023)
- Ecuador: 500,000
- Argentina: 162,495
- Dominican Republic: 124,100
- Portugal: 100,000
- Panama: 94,400
- Trinidad and Tobago: 78,849
- Syria: 60,000 - 200,000
- Italy: 59,000 - 150,000
- Mexico: 53,000
- Uruguay: 33,000
- France: 30,000
- Canada: 28,395
- Germany: 20,000
- French Guiana (Overseas France): 19,000
- Bolivia: 18,940
- Aruba: 17,000
- Curaçao: 17,000
- United Kingdom: 15,000
- Cuba: 15,000
- Lebanon: 12,000
- Australia: 10,000
- Ireland: 5,000
- Paraguay: 4,000
- Puerto Rico: 3,108
- Costa Rica: 3,000
- Guyana: 3,000
- United Arab Emirates: 2,500
- Sweden: 2,274
- New Zealand: 2,000
- Denmark: 1,325
- China: 1,000
- Netherlands: 1,000
- Saudi Arabia: 1,000
- South Africa: 1,000
- Bonaire: 713
- Sint Maarten: 600

Languages
- Primarily Venezuelan Spanish (96.6%) Other languages: Chinese (1.33%); Portuguese (0.84%); Italian (0.66%); Wayuu-Goajiro (0.63%), Pemon (0.1%) and other Amerindian languages (0.33%); Arabic (0.36%)

Religion
- Christian majority: Catholicism (71.0%), Protestantism (Evangelicals) (22.0%), other Christians: Eastern Orthodoxy, Mormonism, Jehovah Witnesses Irreligion, Deism, Agnosticism and Atheism: (8.0%) minorities: Santería (1%), Judaism (0.05%)

Related ethnic groups
- Spaniards, Mestizo, Amerindians

Venezuelans (Spanish: venezolanos) are the people identified with the country of Venezuela. This connection may be through citizenship, familial ties or culture. For most Venezuelans, many or all of these connections exist and are the source of their Venezuelan citizenship or their bond to Venezuela.

Venezuela is a diverse and multilingual country, home to a melting pot of people of distinct origins. As a result, many Venezuelans do not equate their nationality with ethnicity, but with citizenship or allegiance. From the 1820s to the 1930s, Venezuela received 2.1 million European immigrants, the third most in Latin America, behind Argentina and Brazil.

== Historical and ethnic aspects ==
=== Pre-Columbian period ===
Writing was not used in pre-Columbian times, a historical stage where various groups began to move throughout the Americas, thus making it difficult to find evidence of the people who began to populate the land. However, archaeological excavations show evidence of certain periods that were taking place on the continent.

Venezuela was probably first settled by humans 16,000 years ago, due to migration flows from other indigenous cultures of America, from the south to the Amazon, from the west through Los Andes and north by the Caribbean Sea.

There are four periods of diversity that develop in the current Venezuela, which also entering a new period, it did not mean the end of the previous.

The first migrations to the continent were probably from East Asia to 15,000 years. C. These early migrants (called forth by the generic name "Indians") came at first to be located in North America, later moving to the territory of present Venezuela.

During this period, various mammals were disappearing by climatic changes already beginning to take place from 5000 years ago, so the population in the mainland, starts to move towards the coast and spread to some nearby islands, trying to find new feeding alternatives.

=== Colonization ===
On August 2, 1498 (528 years ago), Christopher Columbus, and the Spanish colonizers' ships, first landed on the American mainland in what is currently Venezuelan territory. Colonization was rapid despite small local indigenous rebellions, and the Spaniards managed to conquer the territory. During this period, the most significant crossbreeding process took place, which would later define the social profile of the country.

With the passage of time, and the introduction of the African continent, a third race, the Africans, started to integrate into the population, creating heterogeneity in the faces of the society of the time.

During colonial times (16th, 17th, and 18th centuries), "peninsular whites" began to settle Venezuela, coming directly from the Iberian Peninsula, primarily from the Basque region. These people tended to hold positions in the crown, and they represented 15% of the population. Another group of Whites who were born in Venezuela were originally called "Creole", representing 20% of the population: they were mostly from the Canary Islands and they worked mainly in petty trade. The other two smaller groups were the original inhabitants (Native Americans) and Venezuelan-born Blacks originally brought from Africa: they were about 5% of the population. Soon the racial groups started to intermix and the "browns" were created. They are mixed descendants of Whites, Indians, Blacks, and other Browns. By the 18th century, they were the largest racial group in Venezuela, making up more than 60% of the population.

This process is currently responsible for the majority of Venezuelans who are of mixed race. This number, however, would continue to decrease after the economic boom in the mid 20th century.

=== Current ethnic groups ===
The country has a diverse population that reflects its rich history and the people that have lived here since antiquity to the present. The historic amalgam of different principal groups form the basis of the current demographics of Venezuela: the European immigrants, the Amerindian peoples, African, and other recent immigrants.

Many of the indigenous peoples were absorbed by the mixed population, but the remaining 500,000 currently represent more than 85 different cultures.

European immigrants were mainly of Spanish origin, but another large and growing number are descendants of Europeans (Portuguese, Italians, Germans) who migrated to the region in mid-twentieth century during the oil growth in the country. Small numbers are descendants of French, English, American and Polish people, as they emigrated during World War II, the oil boom period and the Cold War years.

Black Africans were brought as slaves, mostly coastal lowlands, beginning early in the sixteenth century and continuing into the nineteenth century. Other immigrant populations are Asian and Middle Eastern, particularly from Lebanon, Syria and other parts of the Arab world; some Jews from southern Spain, Israel and Central European nations; Dominicans; Trinidadians and Tobagonians; Haitians; Cubans; Peruvians; Argentines; Uruguayans; Chileans; Ecuadorians; Guyaneses; and Colombians, this being the greatest social impact due to a large number of displaced individuals who entered the Venezuelan territory during the armed conflict in that country.

=== Ethnic-somatic characteristics ===
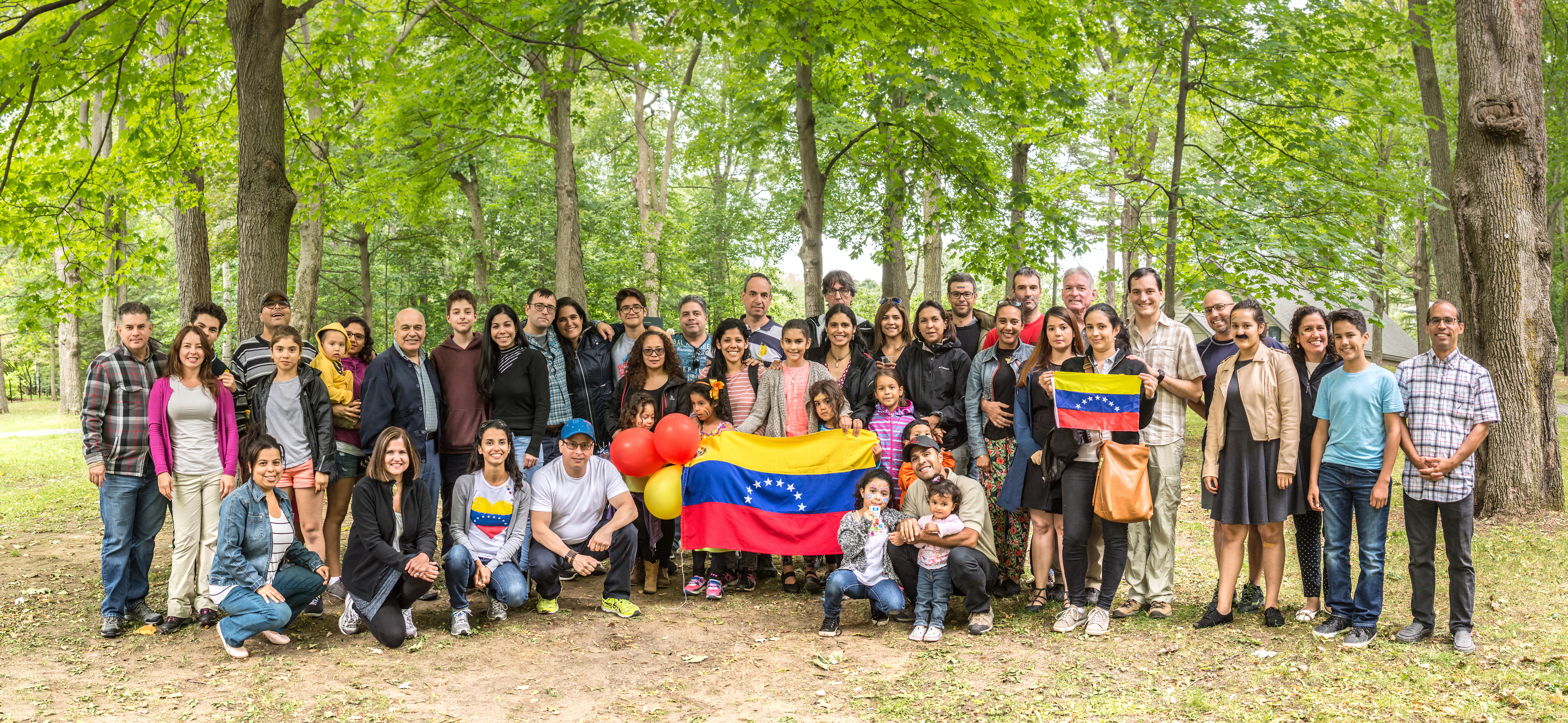
Venezuelan people in Canada.

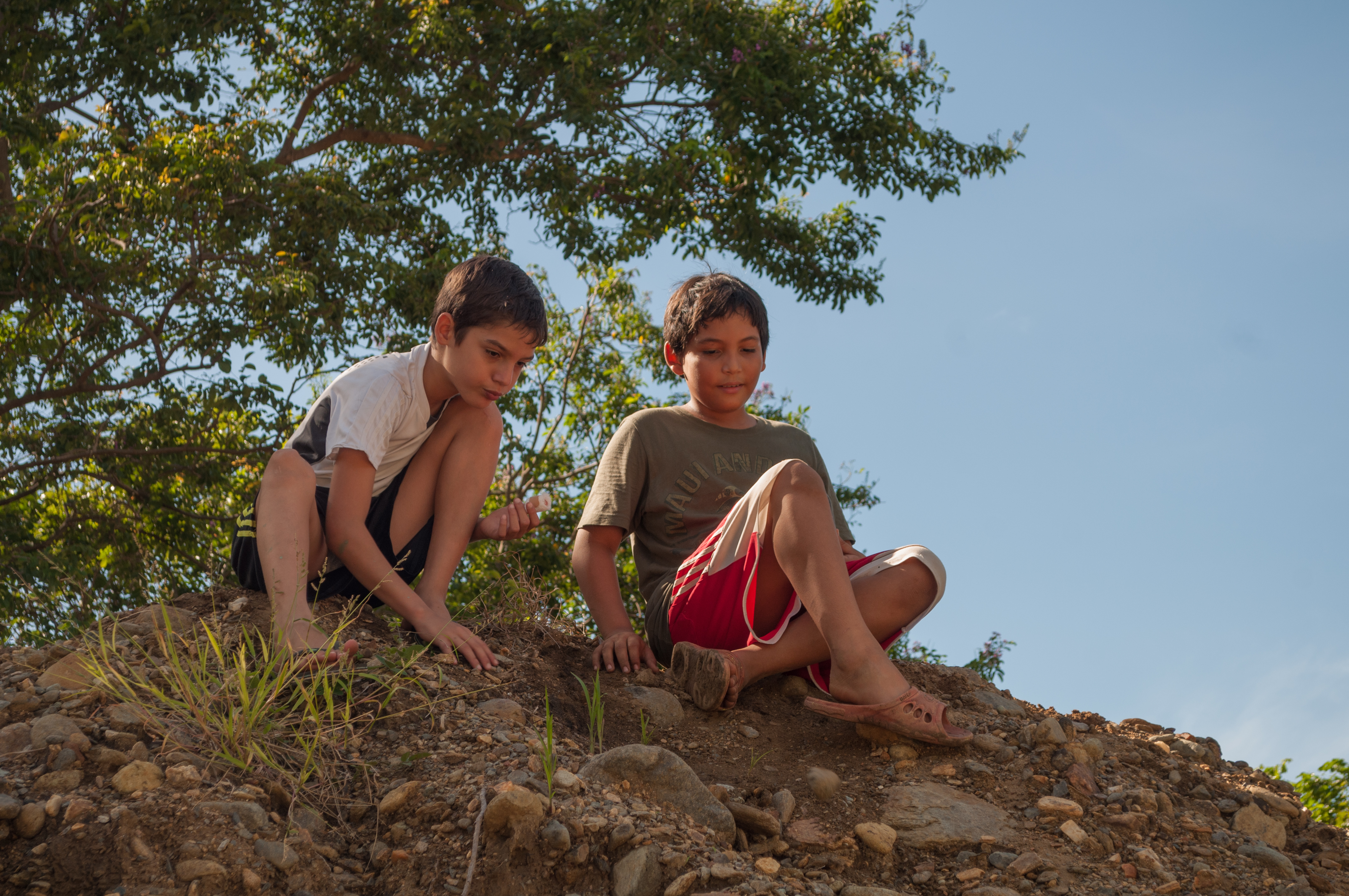
Boys from Margarita Island, Nueva Esparta.

As of 1981, according to the critic D'Ambrosio and other academics, about 51.6% of Venezuelans are mestizos or mulattos, 45% are white, 2% are black and 1% Indians. According to these scholars, is the fact that virtually there are no pure blacks nor indigenous people in Venezuela. With the exception of direct descendants of immigrants or specific indigenous tribes.

In addition, according to a genetic autosomal DNA study conducted in 2008 by the University of Brasilia (UNB), the composition of the population of Venezuela by descent is: 60.60% European, 23% Native American, and 16% African.

== Demography ==
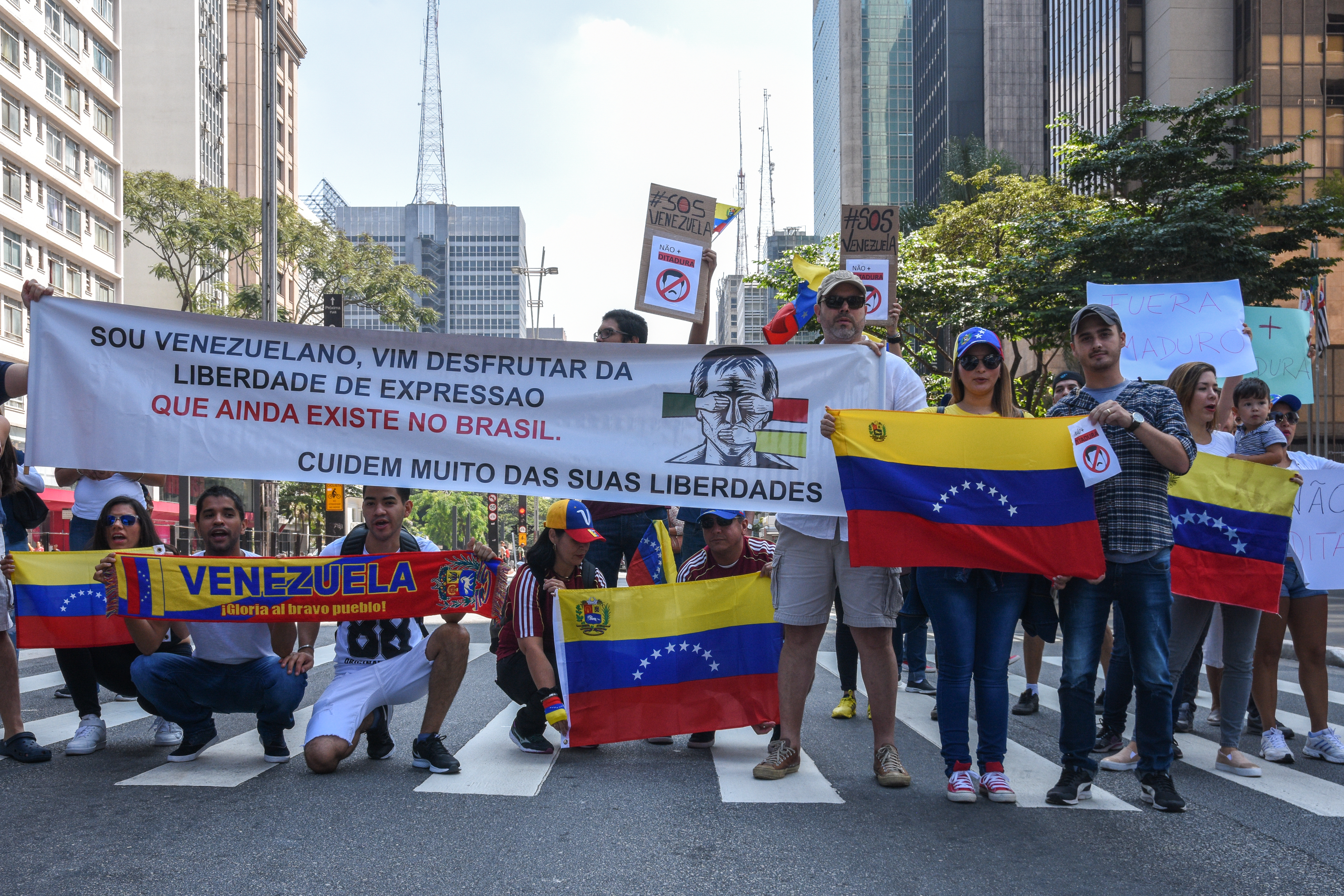
Venezuelans in a protest against the Bolivarian Revolution in São Paulo, Brazil.

Venezuelan diaspora in the world Venezuela + 1,000,000 + 100,000 + 10,000 + 1,000

The population of approximately 28 million people (in 2011) made Venezuela the sixth-most populous country in Latin America (after Brazil, Mexico, Colombia, Argentina and Peru). Approximately more than one million (4-6% of the total population) are living in other countries. Due to the worsening economic conditions in Venezuela, there are 100,000 Venezuelans living in neighbouring Guyana and larger numbers living in Peru, Colombia, Brazil, Ecuador, the USA, Trinidad and Tobago, Chile and Panama.

More than ninety percent of the Venezuelans live in urban areas – a figure significantly higher than the world average. The literacy rate (98 percent) in Venezuela is also well above the world average, and the rate of population growth slightly exceeds the world average. A large proportion of Venezuelans are young, largely because of recent decreases in the infant mortality rate. While 30 percent of the people are 14 years old or younger, just 4 percent are aged 65 or older.

== Ethnic groups ==
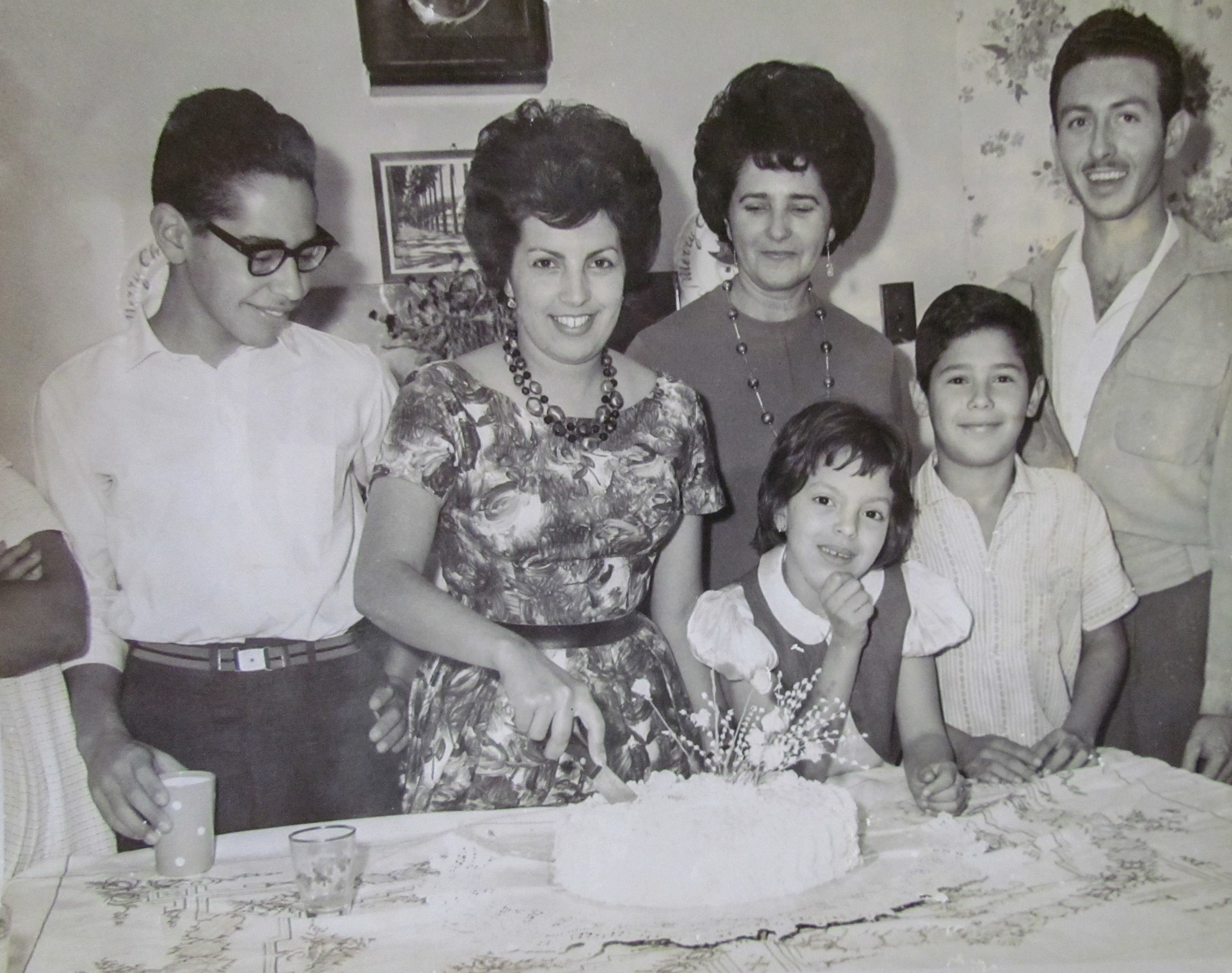
Family in 1961

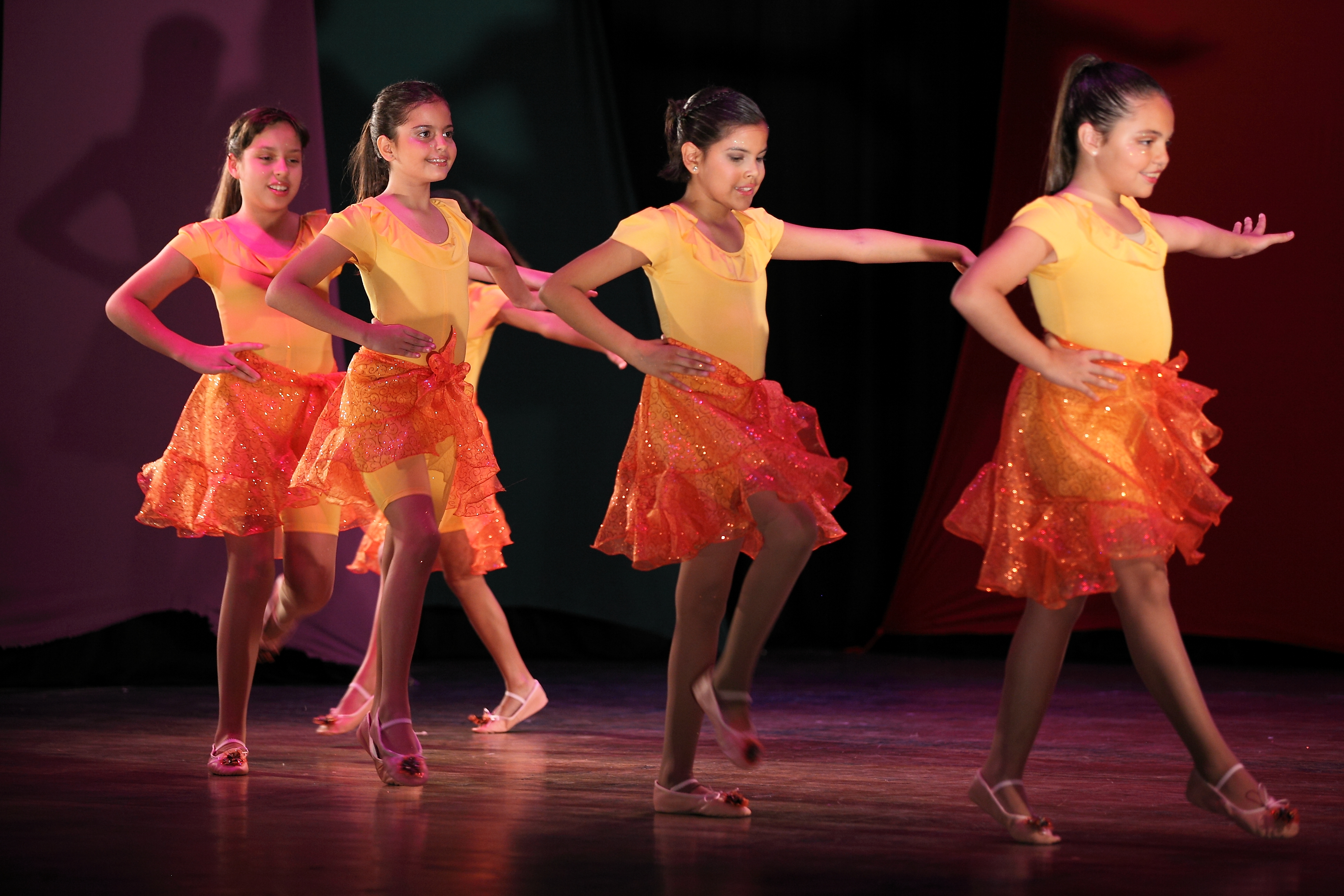
Venezuelan girls dancing

The country has a diverse population that reflects its colorful history and the peoples that have resided there throughout. The historic amalgam of the different main groups forms the basics of Venezuela's current demographics: European immigrants, Amerindian peoples, Africans, Asians (including the Arabs/West Asians) and other recent immigrants. The autosomal DNA genetic composition of population in Venezuela, is 60.60% of European contribution, 23% of Amerindian contribution, and 16.30% of African contribution.

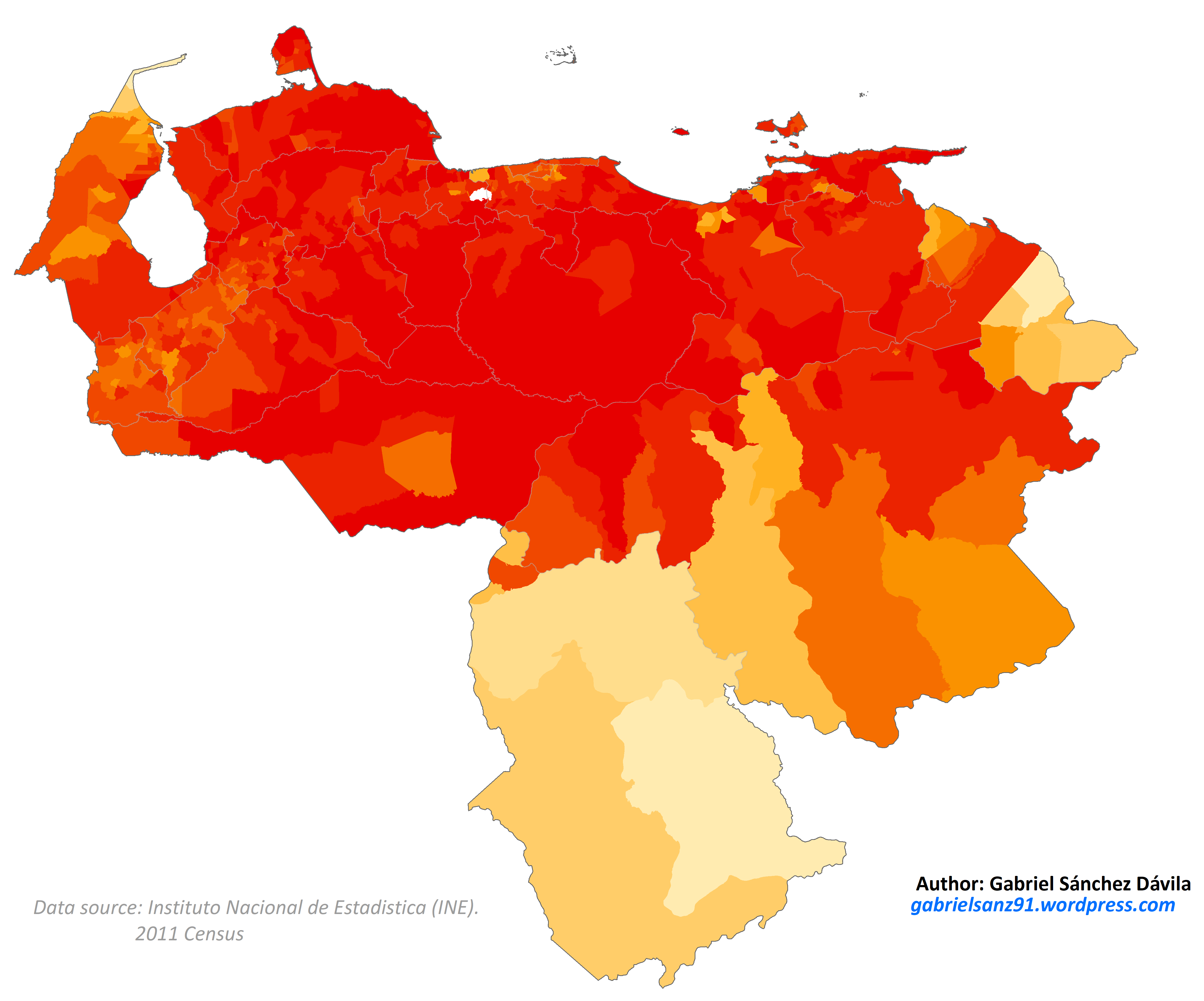
Moreno population of Venezuela in 2011.

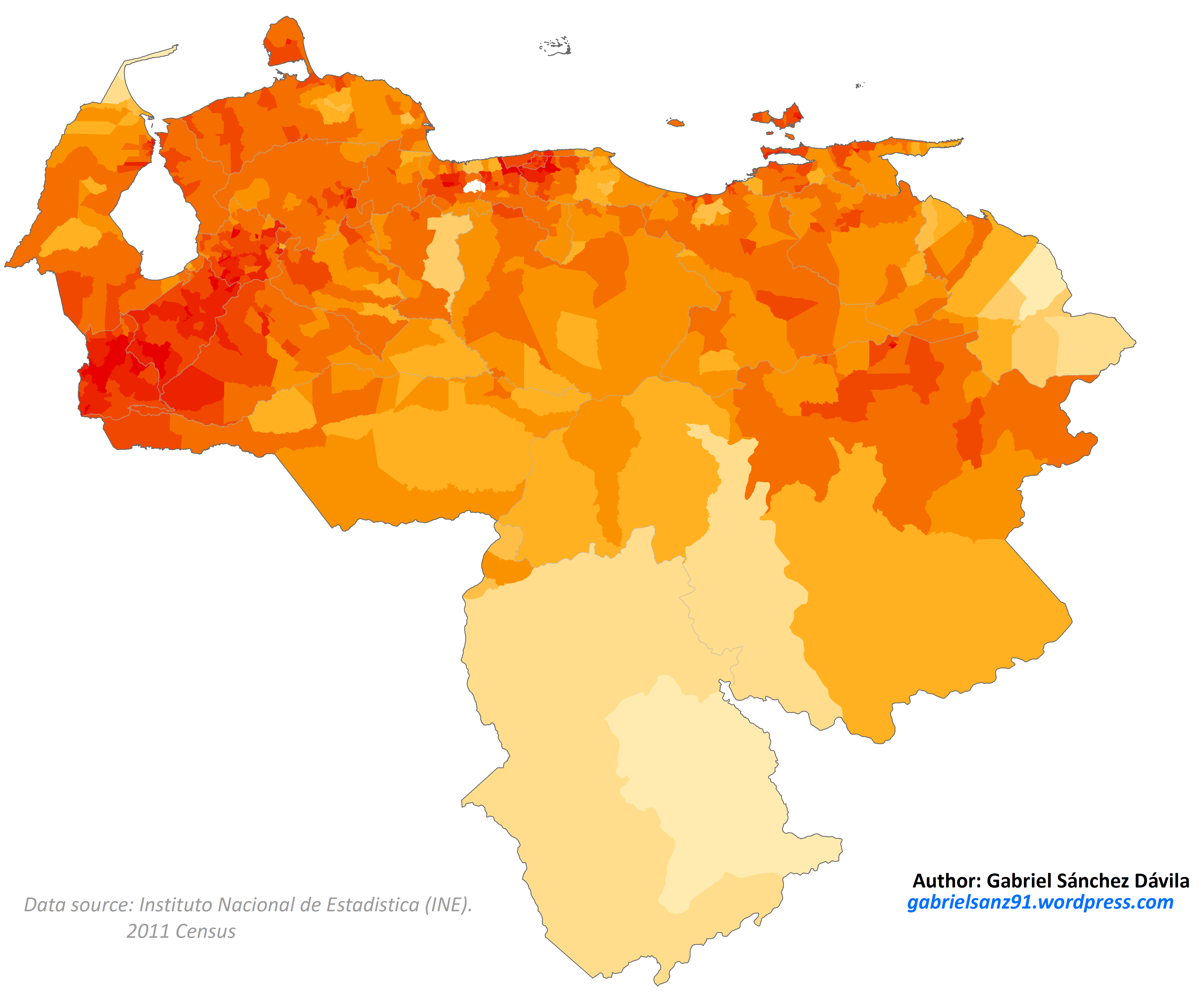
White population of Venezuela in 2011.

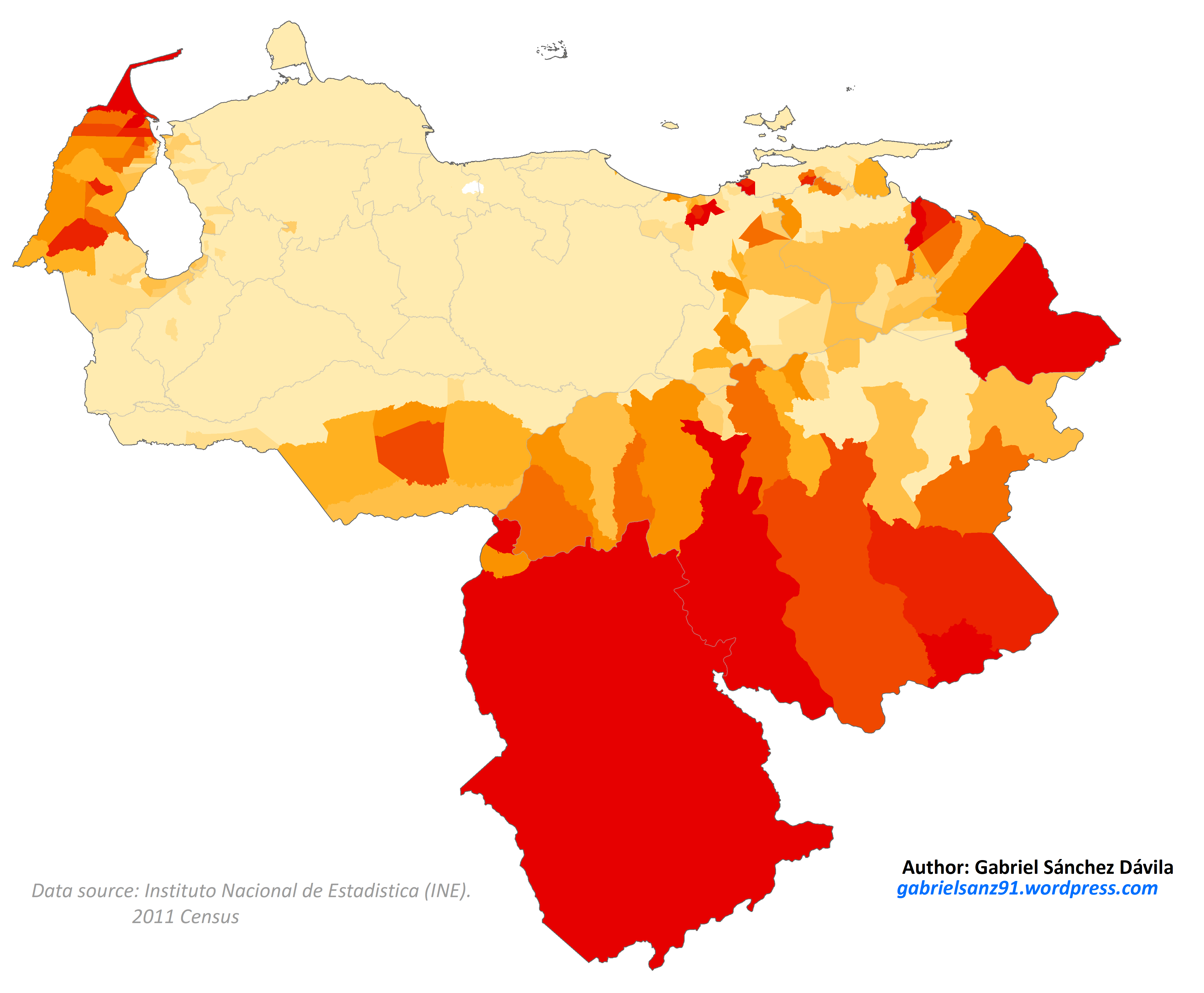
Amerindian population of Venezuela in 2011.

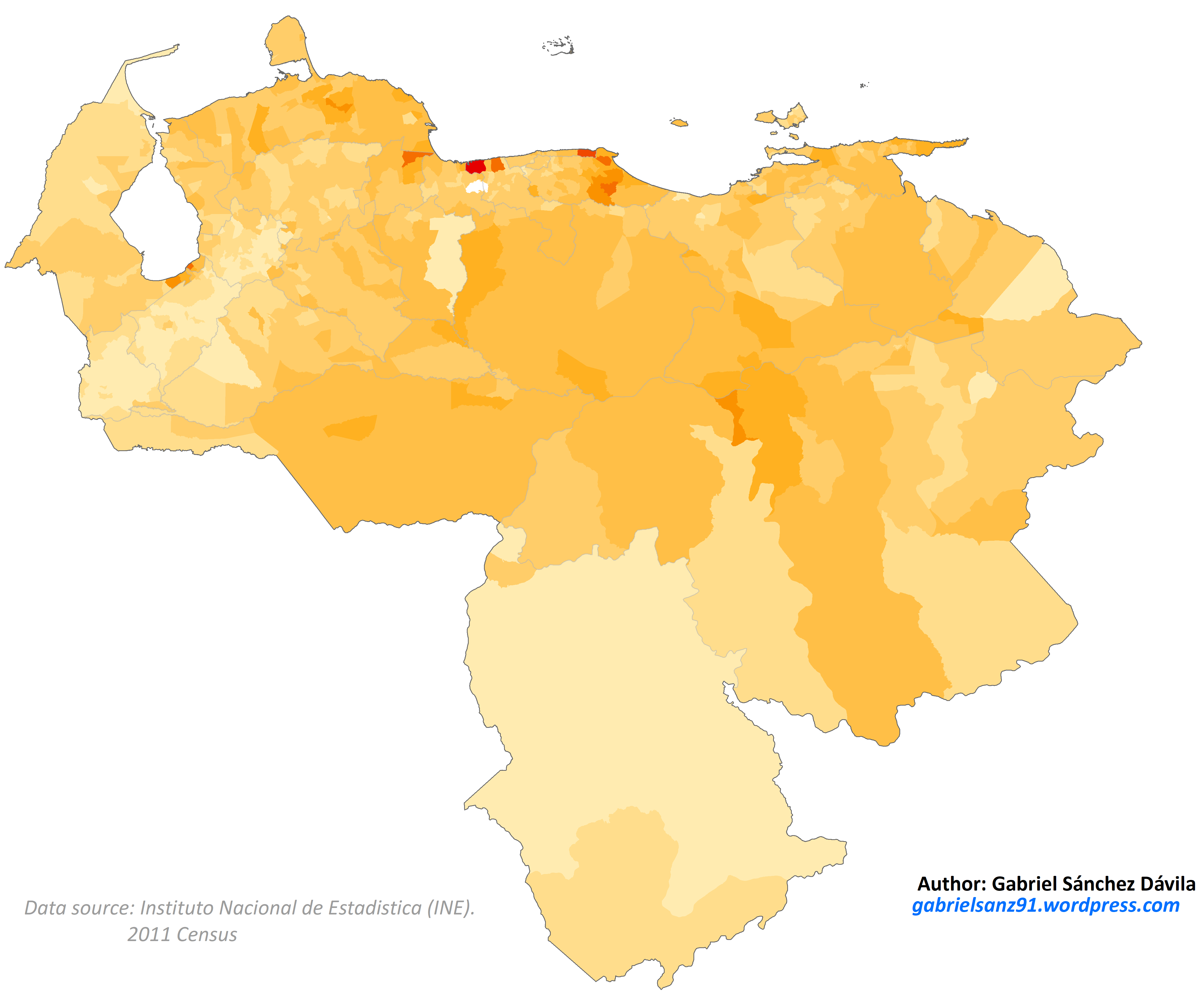
Afro-descendant population of Venezuela in 2011.

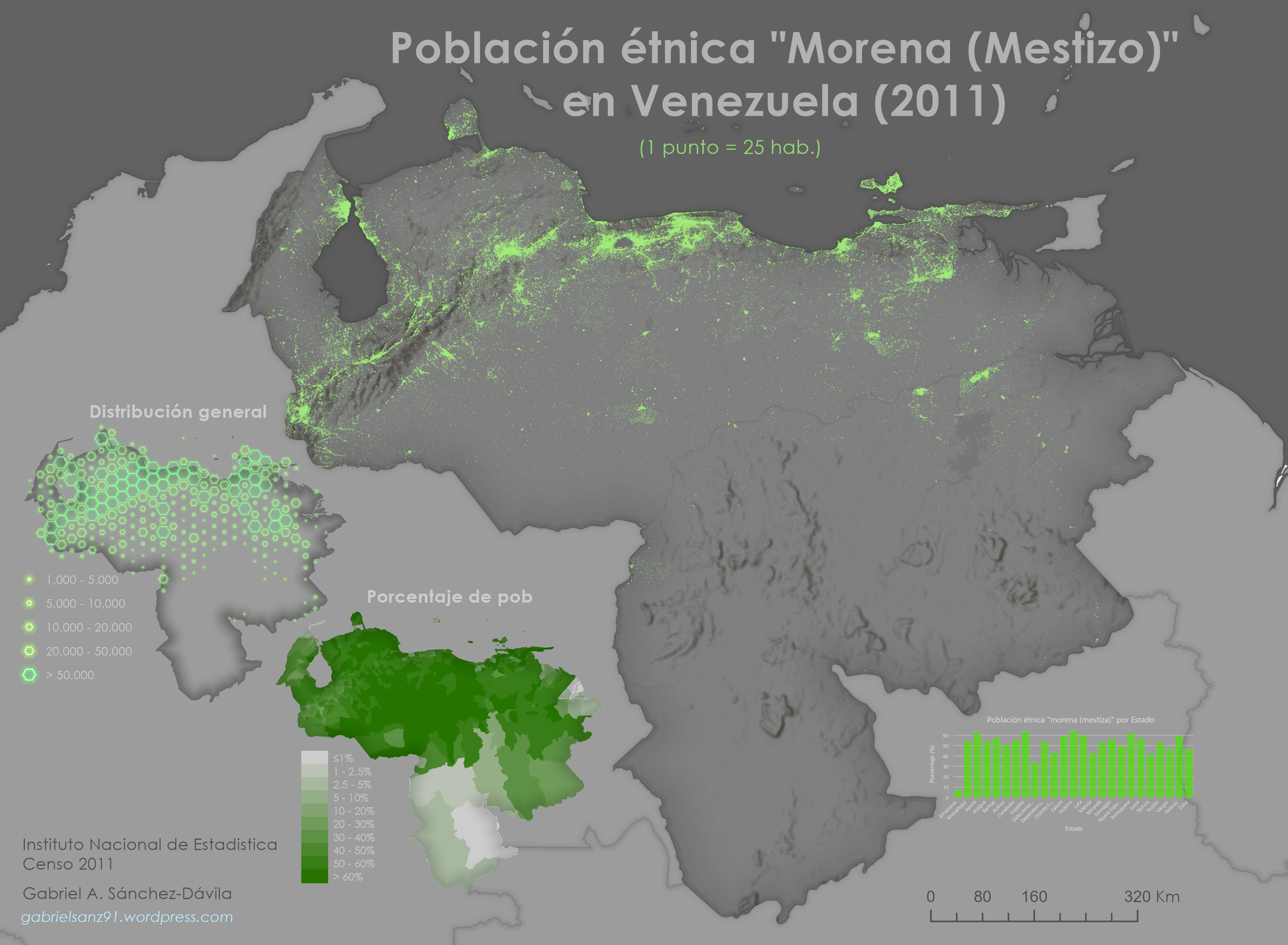
Moreno (Mestizo) population of Venezuela in 2011 (dots = people, shading = population share, hexagons = higher concentration areas).

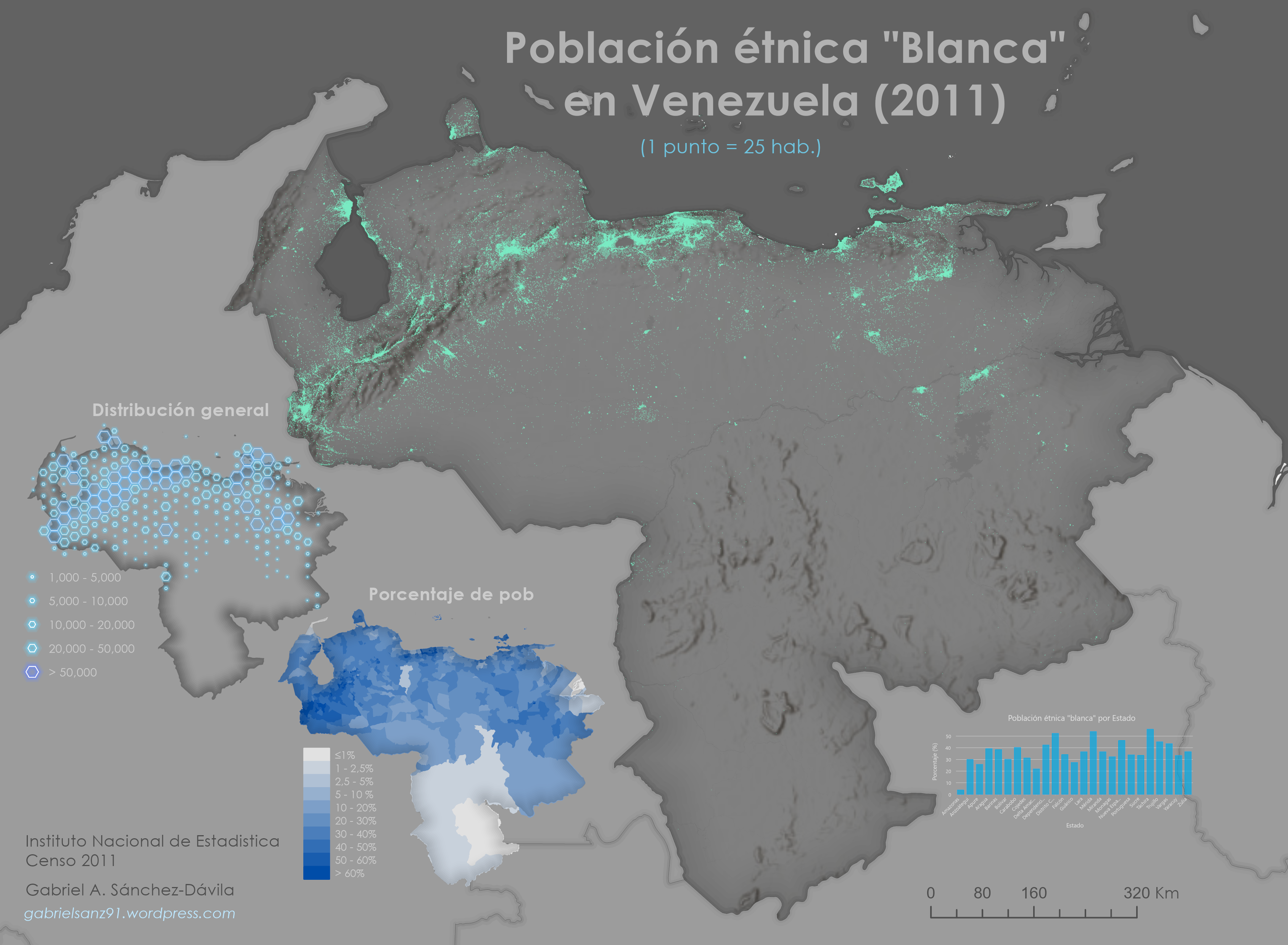
White population of Venezuela in 2011 (dots = people, shading = population share, hexagons = higher concentration areas).

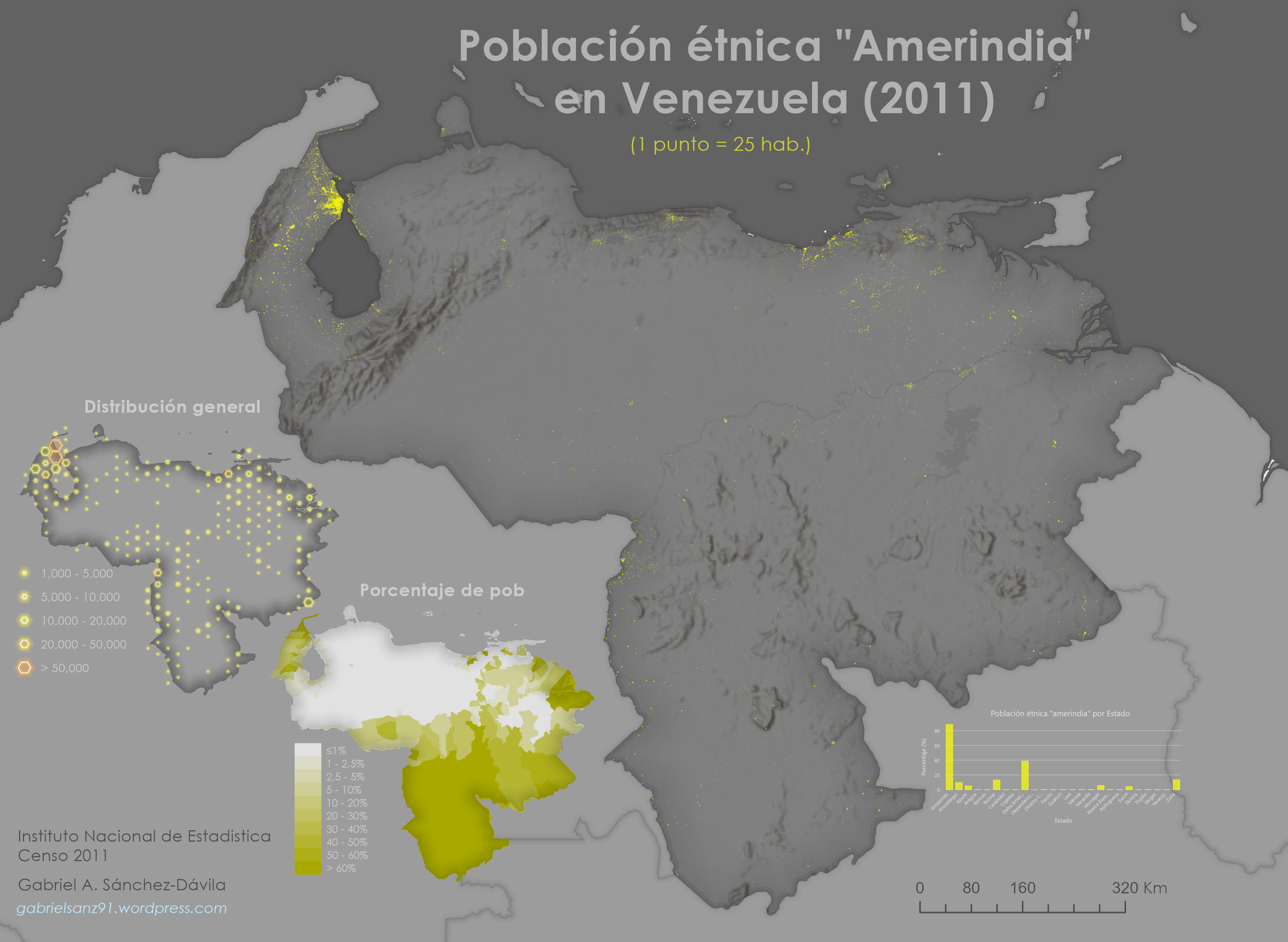
Amerindian population of Venezuela in 2011 (dots = people, shading = population share, hexagons = higher concentration areas).

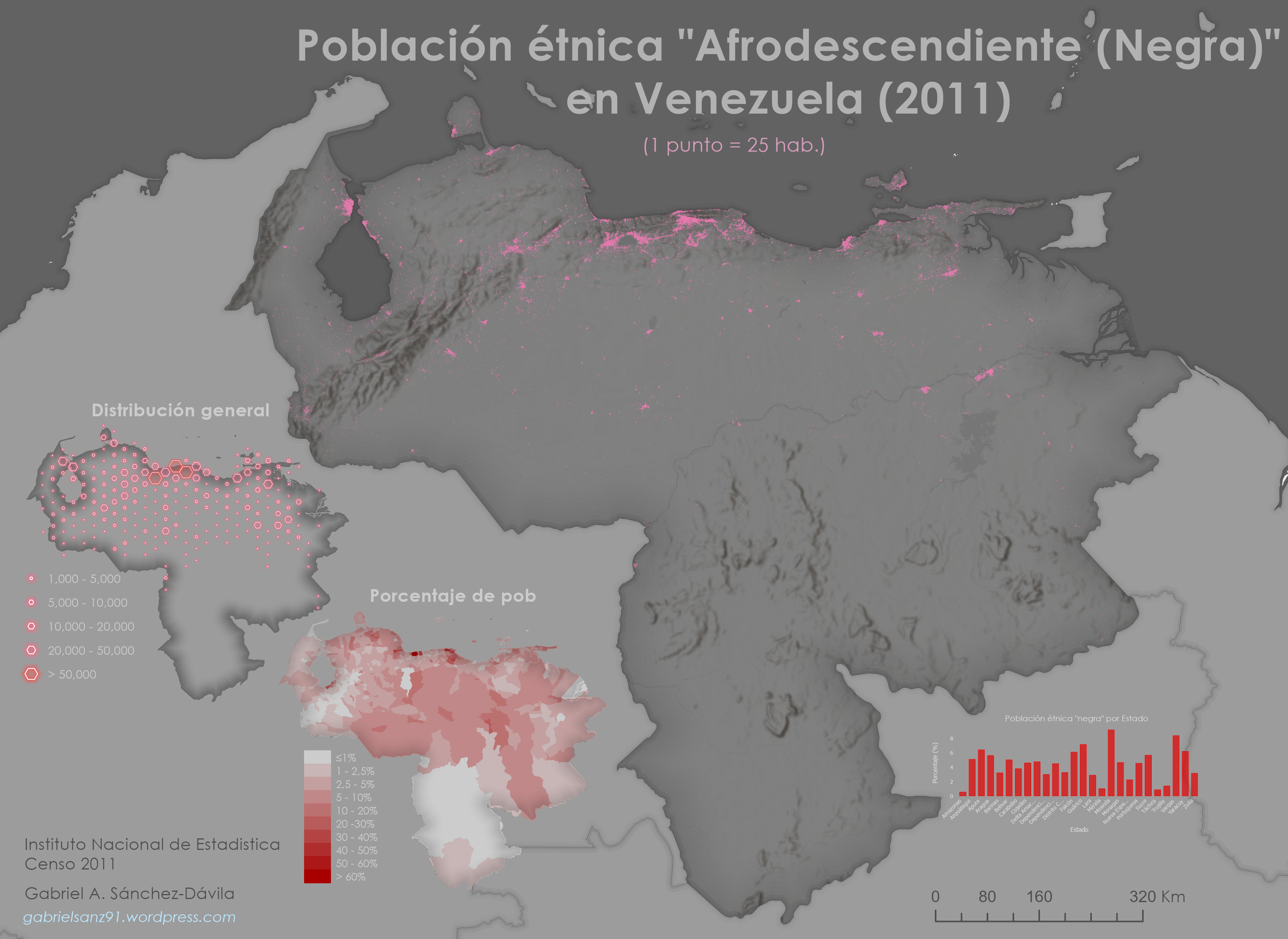
Black and Afrodescendant population of Venezuela in 2011 (dots = people, shading = population share, hexagons = higher concentration areas).

=== Morenos ===
Many of the indigenous peoples were absorbed into the Moreno population, because of the heavy mixture of European and African people. They represent over half of the country's population (about 51.6%).

=== Europeans ===
Early European settlers and post-independence immigrants were mostly Spanish, but a high number of other Europeans brought in were from Portuguese, Italian, and German immigrants to the region in the middle 20th century by the Petroleum Growth, and in much smaller numbers of French, English, Portuguese, Polish, Russian, Greek, Scandinavian, Romanian, Ukrainian and Hungarian communities who immigrated during the Second World War and the Cold War. 300,000 Italians and an equal numbers of Spaniards and immigrated in the 1940s and 1950s, and earlier who were fleeing from the Spanish Civil War (1930s).

Up to 95% of Venezuelans live principally in important urban areas like Greater Caracas, Maracaibo, Maracay, Valencia, Lecheria, Barquisimeto/Cabudare, Colonia Tovar, Punto Fijo; the Andean States, Margarita Island and Araya Peninsula. They represent almost half of the population with 43.6% self-identifying as ‘blanco’ (white) in the 2011 census.

=== Afro-Venezuelans ===
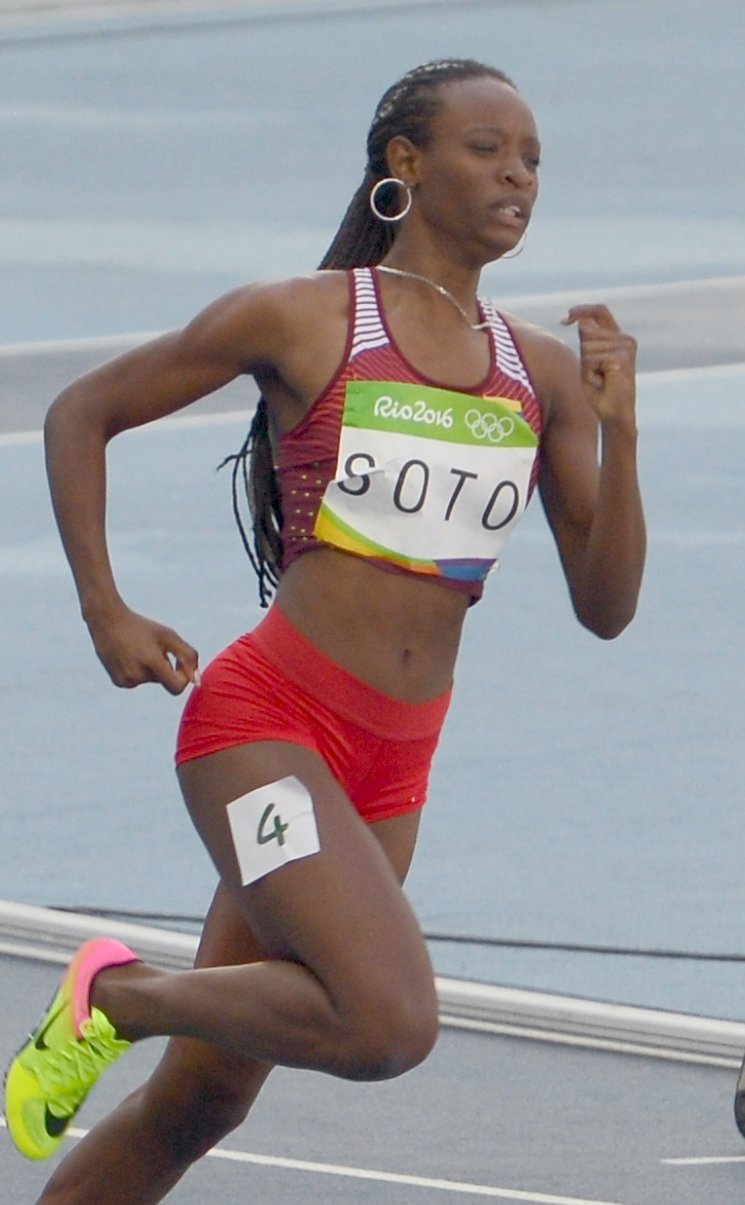
Nercely Soto, Afro-Venezuelan athlete

African people were brought as slaves, mostly to the coastal lowlands, beginning early in the 16th century, and continuing into the mid 19th century. Although they are located in almost the entire country, the Black and African population are concentrated in places where they used to be enslaved and worked as farm hands on subsistence farms of plantains, cocoa, tobacco, sugar cane and cotton in the Aroa Valley, Litoral varguense, Eastern Falcon state; Gibraltar, Bobures and Palmarito in the Sur del Lago Region; and in areas where slaves would run away during Colonial Venezuela and formed cumbes, communities in mountainous and isolated areas, such as, the Sierra de Falcón, Barlovento Region (Acevedo, Andrés Bello, Brión, Buroz and Páez municipalities), Ocumare de La Costa, Choroní; El Callao and Paria Peninsula (where Afro-Trinidadian also migrated); and through Los Llanos, well dispersed in small to decent percents. They represent 3.6% of the population.

=== Amerindians ===
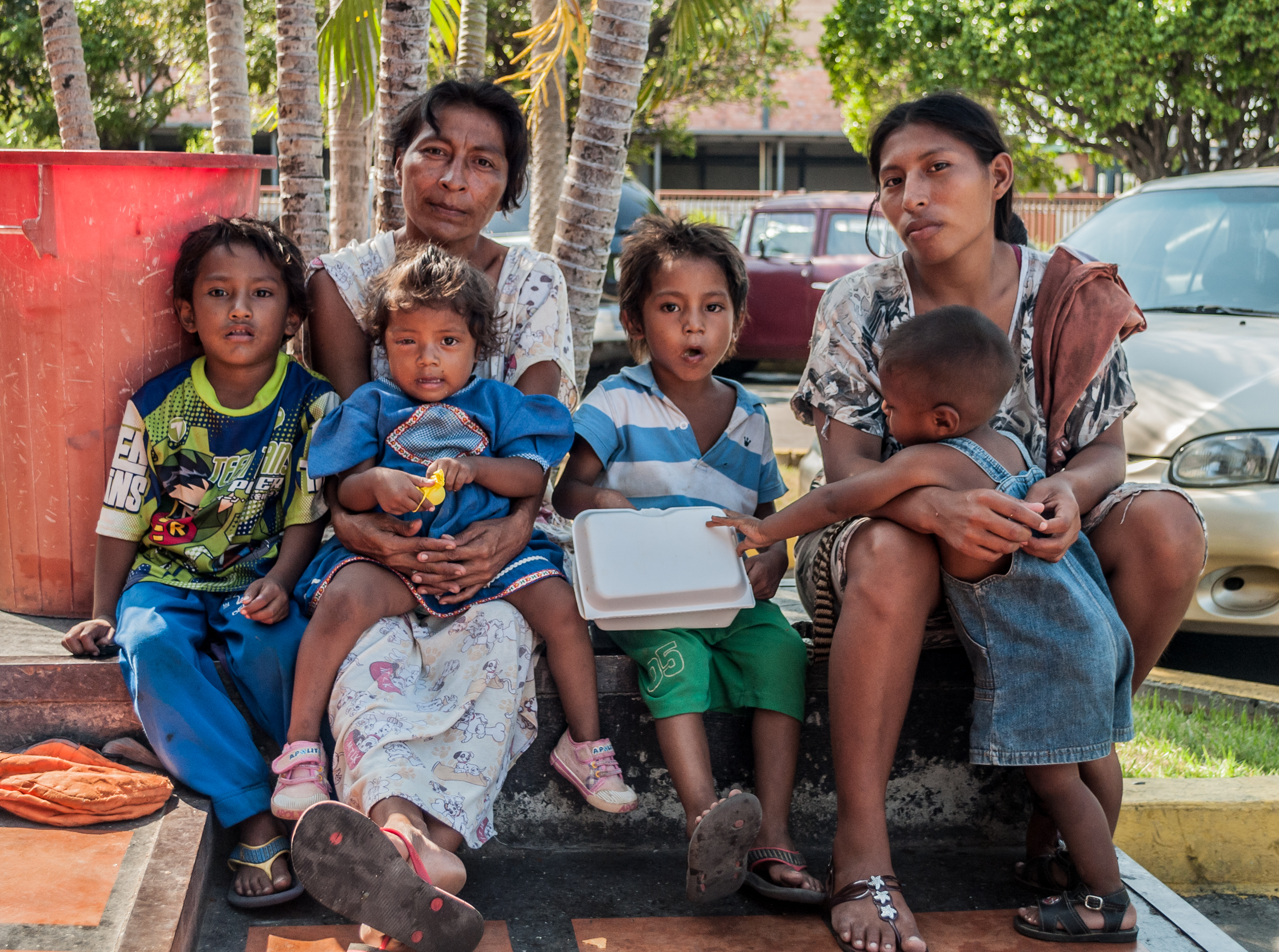
Venezuelan Wayuu family in Zulia

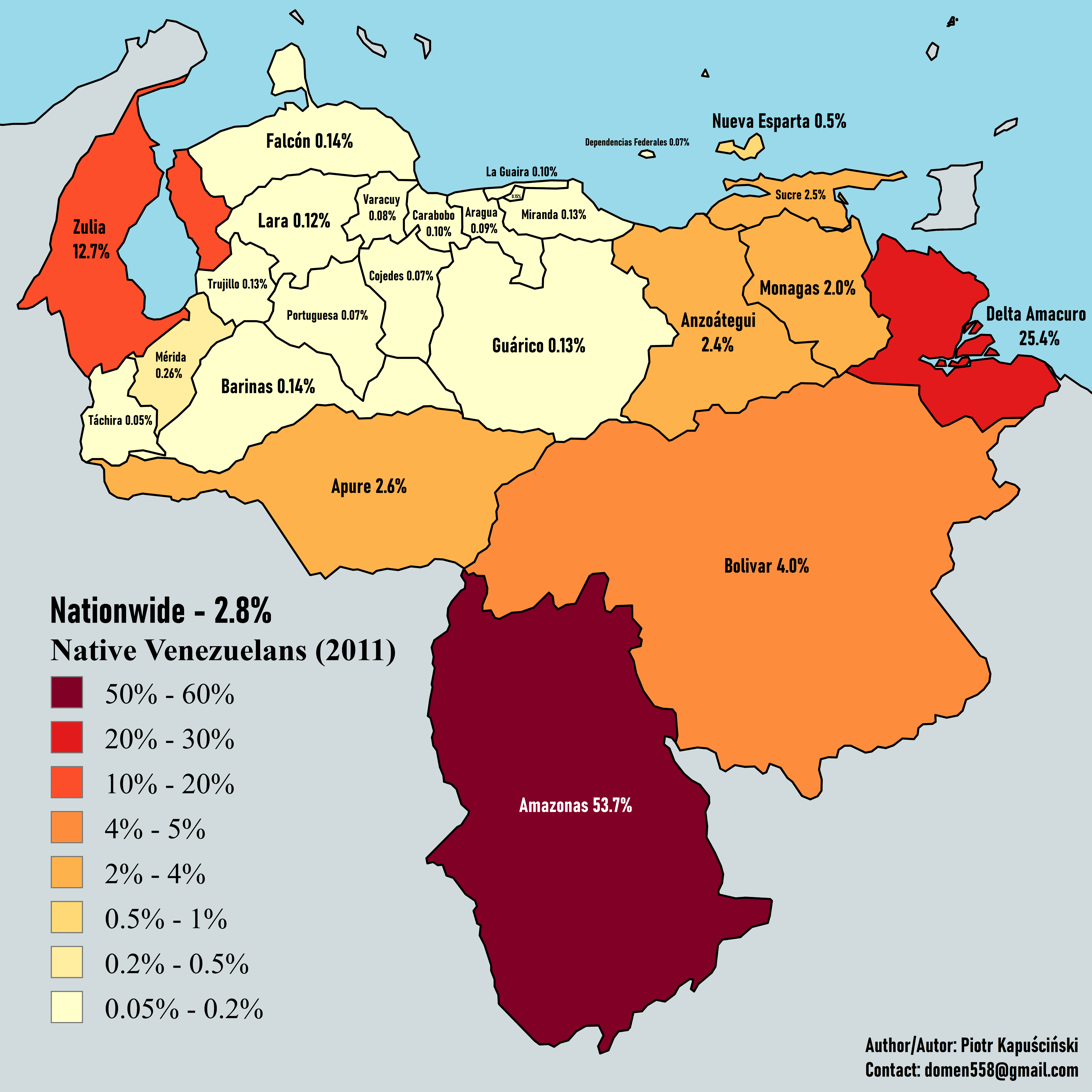
Distribution of Native Venezuelans by state

Before the Spanish colonization of the region that would become the country of Venezuela, the territory was the home to many different indigenous peoples. Today more than fifty different indigenous ethnic groups inhabit Venezuela. Most of them speak languages belonging to the Arawakan, Cariban, and Chibchan languages families. Pure indigenous Amerindians comprise around 2 percent of the population. There are 101 languages listed for Venezuela in the Ethnologue database, of which 80 are spoken today as living languages. Today, they're mostly located south of the Orinoco, in the Guayana Region, an area that covers half of the country but the population represents just 2.7% of Venezuelans; other important regions where they're located are on Zulia state, Apure state, the Eastern Region and Orinoco Delta.

=== Asians ===
==== East and South Asians ====
The largest sub-groups are immigrants or descendants of immigrants from Mainland China, Philippines, India, Japan and Korea. The first wave of immigrants began in 1847 and consisted of mainly Cantonese immigrants; then the second wave during beginning of the 1940s and 1950s, consisted of Chinese and Japanese immigrants; reaching a peak in the mid-1970s in connection with the oil boom, where Korean and Indian immigrants (mostly Indo-Caribbeans) formed a new group to the country. Asian people represent around 1% of the Venezuelan population.

The Chinese in Venezuela are the 4th largest diaspora in the Americas after the United States, Canada and Peru.

==== West Asians ====
Arab immigration to Venezuela started as early as the 19th and 20th centuries. They came mostly from Western Asia, particularly Lebanon, Syria, and Palestine. According to the president of the Federación de Entidades Árabes de Venezuela (FEARAB), the Arab community in the country numbers around 2 million people. They are mostly located in the most important urban areas and Margarita Island, representing around 5% of the population in Venezuela. In religion, the majority of Arab-Venezuelans are Christians who belong to the Roman Catholic, Eastern Orthodox and Eastern Rite Catholic Churches. There are few Muslims.

Israel has been chosen by many Venezuelan Jews, along with the United States and other countries.

According to the Venezuelan Institute of Statistics, about one million Venezuelans have Syrian origins and more than 20,000 Venezuelans are registered in the Venezuelan Embassy in Damascus. Other sources stated that there is around 60,000 Syrian-Venezuelans living in Syria. More than 200,000 people from the Sweida area carry Venezuelan citizenship and most are members of Syria's Druze sect, who immigrated to Venezuela in the past century.

== Religion ==
Religious affiliation in Venezuela. (2011)
Affiliation	% of Venezuela population
Christian	88.3
Catholic	71
Protestant	17
Mormon	0.3
Non-Christian faiths	2.7
Jewish	0.05
Muslim	0.4
Santería	1
Other Non-Christian faiths	1.25
Unaffiliated	9
Agnostic/indifferent	6
Atheist	2
Don't know/refused answer	1
Total	100

According to a 2011 poll, 88.3 percent of the population is Christian, primarily Roman Catholic (71%), 17 percent Protestant, and the remaining 0.03 percent Mormons (LDS Church). The Venezuelans without religion are 9% (atheist 2%, agnostic or indifferent 6% and doesn't know/doesn't respond 1% ), almost 3% of the population follow other religions (1% of them are of santeria).

== See also ==
- List of notable Venezuelans
- Culture of Venezuela
- Venezuelan refugee crisis
- Venezuelan diaspora
- Criollo people
- Venezuelan Americans
- Venezuelans in Spain
- Venezuelans in Uruguay
- Venezuelan Mexicans
- Hispanics
- Race and ethnicity in Latin America
- Venezuelan cuisine
- Indigenous peoples in Venezuela
