= James Tahhan =

Venezuelan chef and television personality (born 1988)

- Born: October 26, 1988 (age 37); Los Teques, Venezuela
- Education: Le Cordon Bleu
- Culinary career
- Cooking style: Modern Latin American cuisine, Fusion cuisine, Spanish cuisine, and Middle Eastern cuisine, Global cuisine
- Current restaurant
- La Doña by chef James
- Previous restaurants
- Sabores – by Chef James; Perfecto Gastrobar
- Television shows
- Un Nuevo Día; ¡Levántate!; Puro Chef; BELatina
- Website: www.jamestahhan.com

James Tahhan (born October 26, 1988) is a Venezuelan chef, television personality, restaurateur, and author who uses the stage name of Chef James. He is best recognized for being the official chef of Telemundo, and being a co-presenter of its morning show Un Nuevo Dia. In 2014, together with his friend, television personality Raúl González, Chef James opened his first restaurant, Sabores – by Chef James. It has subsequently been named one of the best restaurants in Miami. In 2016, Chef James released a cookbook, The Homemade Chef: Ordinary Ingredients for Extraordinary Food.

Tahhan has been a judge on several competitive cooking show including, MasterChef Latino, Chopped, Top Chef Middle East, and the 19th season finale of Worst Cooks in America on the Food Network.

== Early life and education ==
Tahhan was born in Los Teques, Venezuela, the son of Bachir Wahbi Tahhan, of Syrian descent, and Mimi Masri, of Syrian-Venezuelan descent. He was later joined by one brother, Wahbi Tahhan. During his formative years, Tahhan learned home cooking from his parents. During this period, Tahhan was also influenced by David Abal, a neighbor and professional chef of Galician descent, who taught Tahhan the basics of at-home cooking.

At the age of 13, Tahhan emigrated to the United States with his mother, ultimately settling in Miami, Florida. Tahhan began to work to help his mother pay the household bills.

At the age of 16 Tahhan started working on radio as a spokesperson for different brands and products, where his advertisements played on radio stations including WAMR-FM, WAQI, and WMGE.

After two years Tahhan attended Le Cordon Bleu College of Culinary Arts Miami, where he specialized in international cuisine as well as in Patisserie and Baking. While attending school, he also started his own catering business, called Avokado.

== Television career ==
=== Early career ===
His first job after graduating from Le Cordon Bleu was as a line-cook at "Arabian Nights", a Mediterranean restaurant in Miami.

After almost six years working with different brands and products on radio, Tahhan auditioned for a position in Telemundo. He responded to an open-call audition for Telemundo's morning show Levantate (now known as Un Nuevo Día). He was named the official chef co-host of the show and the network.

=== Telemundo ===
Tahhan was a co-host of the morning show, Un Nuevo Día, which has earned him three national Emmy Awards.

Tahhan has crossed-over to the English market. During an initiative named "Healthy Week" by the network NBC Universal, he spoke to American viewers, promoting healthy meals that could be made at home.

Tahhan has been featured on the Today Show, where he shared his take on Latin American Cuisine.

=== Utilísima ===
In March 2012, Tahhan was selected by Utilísima to be one of their newest faces on their hit T.V. show, "Puro Chef". He has subsequently participated on the 4th and 5th season of the show, and has conducted the special Thanksgiving edition.

=== BELatina ===
Tahhan is the host of BeLatina, a show dedicated to women's empowerment and cultural diversity. The show airs on the Lifetime network and features inspiring stories and interviews with influential women from all walks of life.

== Author ==
In 2016, Tahhan released a cookbook, The Homemade Chef: Ordinary Ingredients for Extraordinary Food. The cookbook become a best-seller both regionally and internationally on Amazon.com. Tahhan is also a food columnist and has written for "Venue Magazine", where he gives readers recipes, cooking advice, and his thoughts on healthy living.

== Restaurateur ==
In 2014, Tahhan opened his first restaurant, Sabores, together with his friend and television personality, Raúl González. "People think it's rice and beans and shredded meat, and really it's this hidden treasure that nobody has pushed. We wanted to change that," he said. He first traveled to Latin America to better understand Latin American cuisine.

In 2016, he partnered up in Perfecto Gastrobar, a Spanish inspired restaurant based in Miami, Florida, showcased modern Spanish cuisine. Perfecto Gastrobar was then sold to a Mexican investment group that switched its name to Valentia.

== Public image ==
Tahhan has been named one of the leading Latin chefs in the U.S., and "Miami's Hottest Chef". One source commented, "Not many chefs have their own restaurant, host an Emmy-award winning television morning show…but James Tahhan isn’t like many chefs." In 2013 and 2014, Chef James was recognized by Latin Gourmet as the Chef of the Year.

Tahhan has been awarded the "Social Media Chef" of the year. He was selected for the "50 Most Beautiful People" edition of People en Español magazine.

== The Power of Food ==
Tahhan is the founder of the initiative, The Power of Food (in Spanish: El Poder De La Comida), a program where he and his team come together to prepare meals and distribute people.
