= Venezuelans in Syria =

- (Venezuela) (Syria)
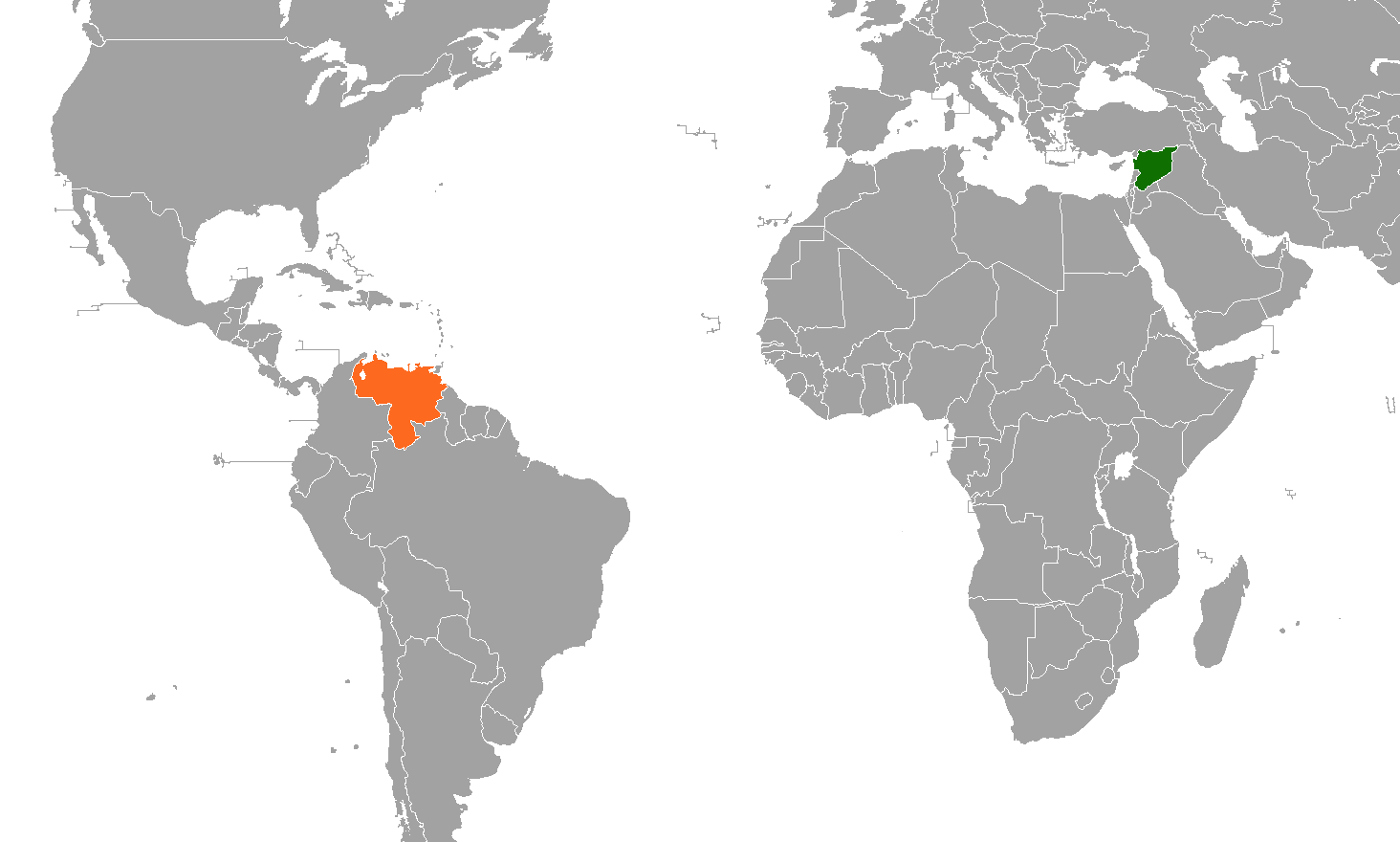

Total population
- 60,000–200,000

Regions with significant populations
- As-Suwayda, Aleppo, Tartus, Damascus and Jaramana

Languages
- Arabic, Venezuelan Spanish

Religion
- Druze, Roman Catholicism, Islam

Venezuelans in Syria include migrants from Venezuela and their descendants.

== History ==
Some Syrian Venezuelans returned during the last decade to Syria, establishing themselves mainly in Aleppo, Tartus and Jaramana (in the outskirts of Damascus), besides in As-Suwayda; which is known also as Little Venezuela, stands out because of the mix of its streets between the Syrian and Venezuelan dialects, the presence of both languages in posters and advertisements, the restaurants and cafes where both gastronomy are merged and where Salsa music and the music of Umm Kulthum can be heard. More than 200,000 people from the Sweida area carry Venezuelan citizenship and most are members of Syria's Druze sect, who immigrated to Venezuela in the past century.

According to the Venezuelan Institute of Statistics, about one million Venezuelans have Syrian origins and more than 20,000 Venezuelans are registered in the Venezuelan Embassy in Damascus. Other sources stated that there is around 60,000 Syrian Venezuelans living in Syria.

== See also ==
- Syrian Venezuelan
- Arab Venezuelan
