= Syrian Venezuelans =

Syrian Venezuelans sirio-venezolano الهجرة السورية إلى فنزويلا
Total population
- Syrian-born residents: 12,108 - 15,632 (2011).; Venezuelans of Syrian descent (various estimates): 700,000 (Fidel, 2010).; 1,000,000 (Levi, 2017).; 1,000,000 (Nachawati, 2017).; 1,000,000 (Gómez, 2017).; 400,000 (Aljadid, 2017)

Regions with significant populations
- Caracas, Puerto La Cruz, Maracaibo, Margarita Island, Maracay, Valencia, Ciudad Guayana, Maturin, Barquisimeto, Cumaná

Languages
- Venezuelan Spanish and Syrian Arabic

Religion
- Predominantly Christianity, minority Druze

Related ethnic groups
- Syrian and Syrian diaspora

Syrian Venezuelans refers to Venezuelan citizens of Syrian origin. Syrians are the largest immigrant group of Arabic origin in Venezuela.

== Migration history ==
Syrian migration to Venezuela began towards the end of the nineteenth century, when thousands of Syrian Christians and Jews arrived escaping the downfall of the last years of existence of the Ottoman Empire. Since then, the flow of people between Syria and Venezuela has been constant.

The huge Syrian migration to Venezuela took place during the oil boom of the 1950s. Almost every town and village which had missed having Syrian settlers from the earlier immigrations, which began in the late 1880s, now has at least one Syrian family. They have joined the approximately 500,000 prior immigrants and their descendants, reinforcing Arab culture amongst the older Syrian community which had been almost totally assimilated.

== Emigration ==
Some Syrian-Venezuelans returned during the last decade to Syria, establishing themselves mainly in Aleppo, Tartus and Jaramana (in the outskirts of Damascus). The Syrian city of As-Suwayda; which is known also as Little Venezuela, stands out because of the mix of its streets between the Syrian and Venezuelan dialects, the presence of both languages in posters and advertisements, the restaurants and cafes where both gastronomy are merged and where Caribbean Salsa and the music of Umm Kulthum can be heard. More than 200,000 people from the Suwayda area carry Venezuelan citizenship and most are members of Syria's Druze community, who immigrated to Venezuela in the 20th century.

== Religion ==
The majority of Syrian-Venezuelans are Druze, Roman Catholic and Eastern Orthodox.

Venezuela is home of the largest Druze communities outside the Middle East, the Druze community are estimated around 60,000, and they are mostly Lebanese and Syrian.

A few Syrian Muslims and Jews settled in Venezuela.

== Notable people ==
- Tareck El Aissami, politician who has served as Vice President of Venezuela from 4 January 2017 to 14 June 2018.
- Tarek Saab, politician, lawyer, and poet
- Mariam Habach, model and beauty pageant titleholder who won Miss Venezuela
- Walid Makled, businessman
- Daniel Suchar, economist
- James Tahhan, chef, television personality, restaurateur, and author.
- Adel el Zabayar, politician, former Deputy of PSUV
- Haiman El Troudi, engineer, Deputy of the National Assembly of Venezuela
- Soraya El Achkar, former Director General of Venezuelan National Police force
- Alleh & Yorghaki, alternative Latin music duo from Valencia, Venezuela, both of Syrian descent.
- Stephany Abasali, Beauty Queen who won Miss Venezuela 2024
- Nariman Battikha, Beauty Queen and Economist who won Reina Hispanoamericana 2018
- Stephany Abasali, Beauty Queen who won Miss Venezuela 2024

== See also ==
- Immigration to Venezuela
- Arab Venezuelan
- As-Suwayda (Little Venezuela)
- Venezuelans in Syria
- Syriac Catholic Apostolic Exarchate of Venezuela
