= Sur del Lago de Maracaibo =

Sur del Lago de Maracaibo Sur del Lago
- Subregión
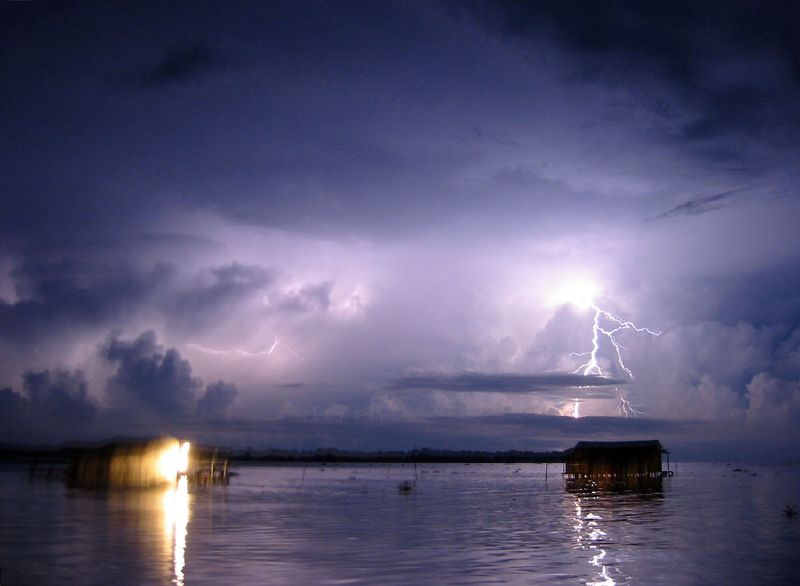
- View of Catatumbo lightning, Zulia

- Approximate extent of Sur del Lago
- Coordinates: 9°N 73°W
- Country: Venezuela
- Region: Zulia

Area
  - Total: 18,440 km^{2} (7,120 sq mi)

Population (2012)
  - Total: 624,177
  - Density: 33.85/km^{2} (87.67/sq mi)

Sur del Lago de Maracaibo (often abbreviated as Sur del Lago, in English South of Maracaibo Lake) is a subregion comprising the territory of the municipalities Jesús María Semprún, Catatumbo, Colón, Francisco Javier Pulgar and Sucre from Zulia state and the municipality Alberto Adriani, Obispo Ramos Lora and the population of Palmarito from Tulio Febres Cordero municipality from the state of Mérida, Venezuela. Its major towns are Santa Barbara del Zulia, San Carlos del Zulia and El Vigia, which represents its economic epicenter.

== Bibliography ==
- La región histórica del sur del Lago de Maracaibo y la influencia geohistórica de la ciudad de Mérida. Claudio Alberto Briceño Monzón, Universidad de Los Andes. (Spanish)
