= Arab Venezuelans =

Total population
- c. 2,000,000

Regions with significant populations
- Caracas, Maracaibo, Valencia, Maracay, Ciudad Guayana, Barcelona-Puerto La Cruz, Punto Fijo, Margarita Island

Languages
- Venezuelan Spanish, Arabic, English

Religion
- Roman Catholicism; Eastern Catholicism (Maronites); Eastern Orthodoxy; Druze; Islam

Related ethnic groups
- Arab Colombians, Arab Argentines, Arab Mexicans, Arab Brazilians, Arab Christians, Arab Muslims, Druze, Lebanese, Syrians, Palestinians

Arab Venezuelans (Arabic: عرب فنزويلا; Spanish: Árabe-Venezolano) refers to Venezuelan citizens of Arab origin or descent. There are around 2,000,000 Venezuelans of Arab origin, mainly from Lebanon, Syria and Palestine. Most Arab Venezuelans are of Syrian descent with their number between 400,000 and 1 million inhabitants, and Lebanese descent numbering 344,000 as of 2017

== Migration history ==
Arab immigration to Venezuela started in the 19th century. They came mostly from the Ottoman provinces of Lebanon and Syria, and are present in significant numbers in Caracas.

Immigration of Arabs in Venezuela has influenced Venezuelan culture, in particular Arabic food and music.

In religion, the majority of Arab-Venezuelans are Christians who belong to the Roman Catholic, Eastern Orthodox, Eastern Rite Catholic Churches, about 550,000 Druze, and 10,000 Muslims.

According to the Venezuelan Institute of Statistics, about one million Venezuelans have Syrian origins and more than 20,000 Venezuelans are registered in the Venezuelan Embassy in Damascus. Other sources stated that there are about 60,000 Syrian-Venezuelans living in Syria. More than 200,000 people from the Sweida area carry Venezuelan citizenship and most are members of Syria's Druze sect, who immigrated to Venezuela in the past century. In 2021, the largest Druze communities outside the Middle East were in Venezuela and the United States (50,000).

== Notable people ==
- Mariam Habach, Beauty Queen, Miss Venezuela 2015, Syrian father and a Venezuelan mother
- Stephany Abasali, born to a Syrian father , Miss Venezuela 2024

== See also ==
- Syrian Catholic Apostolic Exarchate of Venezuela
- Islam in Venezuela
- Lebanese Venezuelans
- Syrian Venezuelans
- Arab diaspora
- Arab diaspora in Colombia
