= Syrians =

People of Syria

سُورِيُّون; Sūriyyūn
- Flag of Syria

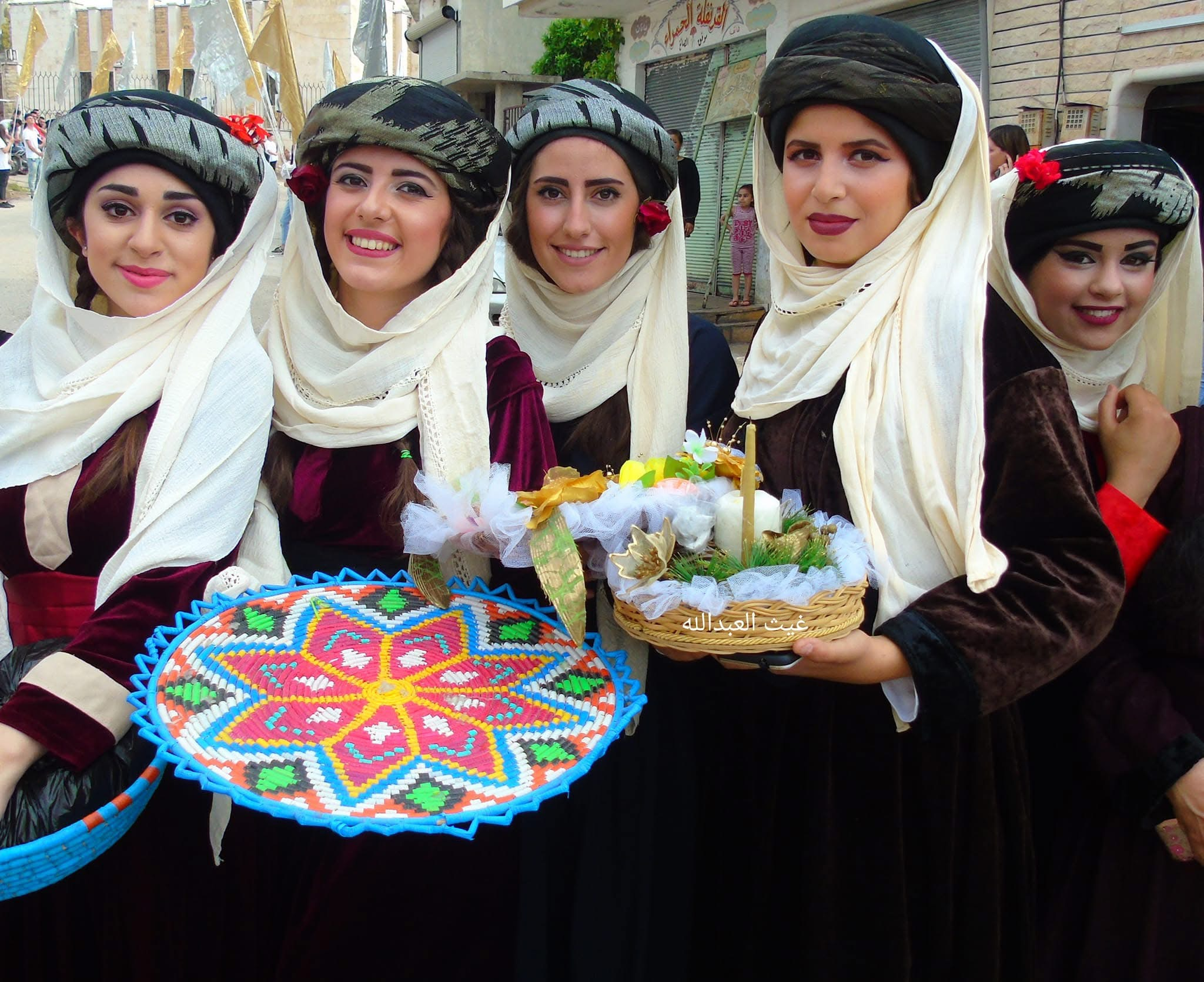
- Syrians in traditional folk costume in As-Suqaylabiyah, Syria

Total population
- 49,974,216 (Note: Most numbers, aside from these of South American countries, represent all Syrian citizens including ethnic minorities such as the Kurds, Assyrians and Armenians)

Regions with significant populations
- Syria; 25,603,166 (2025 estimate)
- Brazil: 4,000,000
- Turkey: 3,600,000
- Argentina: 2,000,000
- Egypt: 1,500,000
- Jordan: 1,200,000
- Lebanon: 1,129,624
- Saudi Arabia: 500,000 – 2,500,000
- Germany: 712,000 – 973,000 – 1,281,000
- Venezuela: 400,000 – 1,000,000
- Iraq: 295,000
- United States: 281,331
- Sweden: 263,899
- United Arab Emirates: 250,000
- Chile: 200,000
- Kuwait: 150,000
- Netherlands: 150,000
- Sudan: 60,000 – 250,000
- France: 80,000
- Canada: 77,050
- Algeria: 50,000 – 84,700
- Australia: 55,321
- Qatar: 54,000
- Austria: 49,779
- Denmark: 46,334
- Norway: 36,026
- Ivory Coast: 15,000
- Spain: 11,188
- United Kingdom: 8,848 England & Wales unknown in Scotland and 2,000 in Northern Ireland.
- Guadeloupe (Overseas France): 10,000
- Finland: 9,333
- Italy: 8,227 (Syrian born)
- Morocco: 5,250
- Tunisia: 5,000
- Ireland: 3,922
- French Guiana (Overseas France): 3,120
- Mali: 3,000
- Yemen: 3,000
- Japan: 1,091
- Martinique (Overseas France): 1,000

Languages
- majority: Arabic (Syrian and Mesopotamian) Minority: Kurdish, Syrian Turkish, Neo-Aramaic Armenian, Circassian etc.; Liturgical: Syriac

Religion
- Mainly Islam (mostly Sunni Islam, minority Shi'as, Alawite); Minorities Christianity (mostly Antiochian Orthodox and Melkite Greek Catholics; a minority of Syriac Orthodox, Assyrian Church of the East, Chaldean Catholic); Druze; Judaism

Related ethnic groups
- Lebanese, Palestinians, Jordanians, Iraqis, other Arabs, Assyrians and Armenians

Syrians (Arabic: سوريون; Syriac: ܣܘܪܝܝܢ) are the native inhabitants of Syria, most of whom have Arabic in its Levantine dialect as a mother tongue. The cultural and linguistic heritage of Syria is a blend of both indigenous elements and the foreign cultures that have come to rule the land and its people over the course of thousands of years. By the seventh century, most of the inhabitants of the Levant spoke Aramaic. In the centuries after the Muslim conquest of the Levant in 634, Arabic gradually became the dominant language, but a minority of Syrians (particularly the Assyrians and Syriac-Arameans) retained Aramaic (Syriac), which is still spoken in its Eastern and Western dialects.

The national name "Syrian" was originally an Indo-European corruption of Assyrian and applied to Assyria in northern Mesopotamia, however by antiquity it was used to denote the inhabitants of the Levant. Following the Muslim conquest of the Levant, Arab identity gradually became dominant among many Syrians, and the ethnonym "Syrian" was used mainly by Christians in Levant, Mesopotamia and Anatolia who spoke Syriac. In the 19th century, the name "Syrian" was revived amongst the Arabic speakers of the Levant. Following the establishment of the Arab Kingdom of Syria in 1920, the name "Syrian" began to spread amongst its Arabic speaking inhabitants. The term gained more importance during the Mandate for Syria and the Lebanon, becoming the accepted national name for the Arabic speakers of the Syrian Republic.

Most Arabic-speaking Syrians identify as Arabs and are described as such by virtue of their modern-day language and bonds to Arab culture and history. In terms of genetics, they are a blend of the various Semitic-speaking groups indigenous to the region. There is no contradiction between being an Arab and a Syrian since the Syrian Arab identity is multi-layered and being Syrian complements being Arab. In addition to denoting Syrian Arabs, the term "Syrian" also refers to all Syrian citizens, regardless of their ethnic background. In 2018, Syria had an estimated population of 19.5 million, which includes, aside from the aforementioned majority, Kurds, Assyrians, Turkmen, Armenians and others.

Even before the Syrian Civil War, there was a large Syrian diaspora that had emigrated to North America (United States and Canada), European Union member states (including Sweden, France, and Germany), South America (mainly in Brazil, Argentina, Venezuela, and Chile), the West Indies, Africa, Australia, and New Zealand. Six million refugees of the Syrian Civil War also live outside Syria now, mostly in Turkey, Egypt, Jordan, Lebanon, Germany as well as Sweden.

== Etymology ==
Various sources indicate that the name Syria itself is derived from Luwian term "Sura/i", and the derivative ancient Greek name: Σύριοι, Sýrioi, or Σύροι, Sýroi, both of which originally derived from the Akkadian word Aššūrāyu (Assyria) in northern Mesopotamia, modern-day Iraq. However, during the Seleucid Empire, this term was also applied to The Levant, and henceforth the Greeks applied the term without distinction between the Assyrians of north Mesopotamia and Arameans of the Levant.

=== Applications of the name in antiquity ===
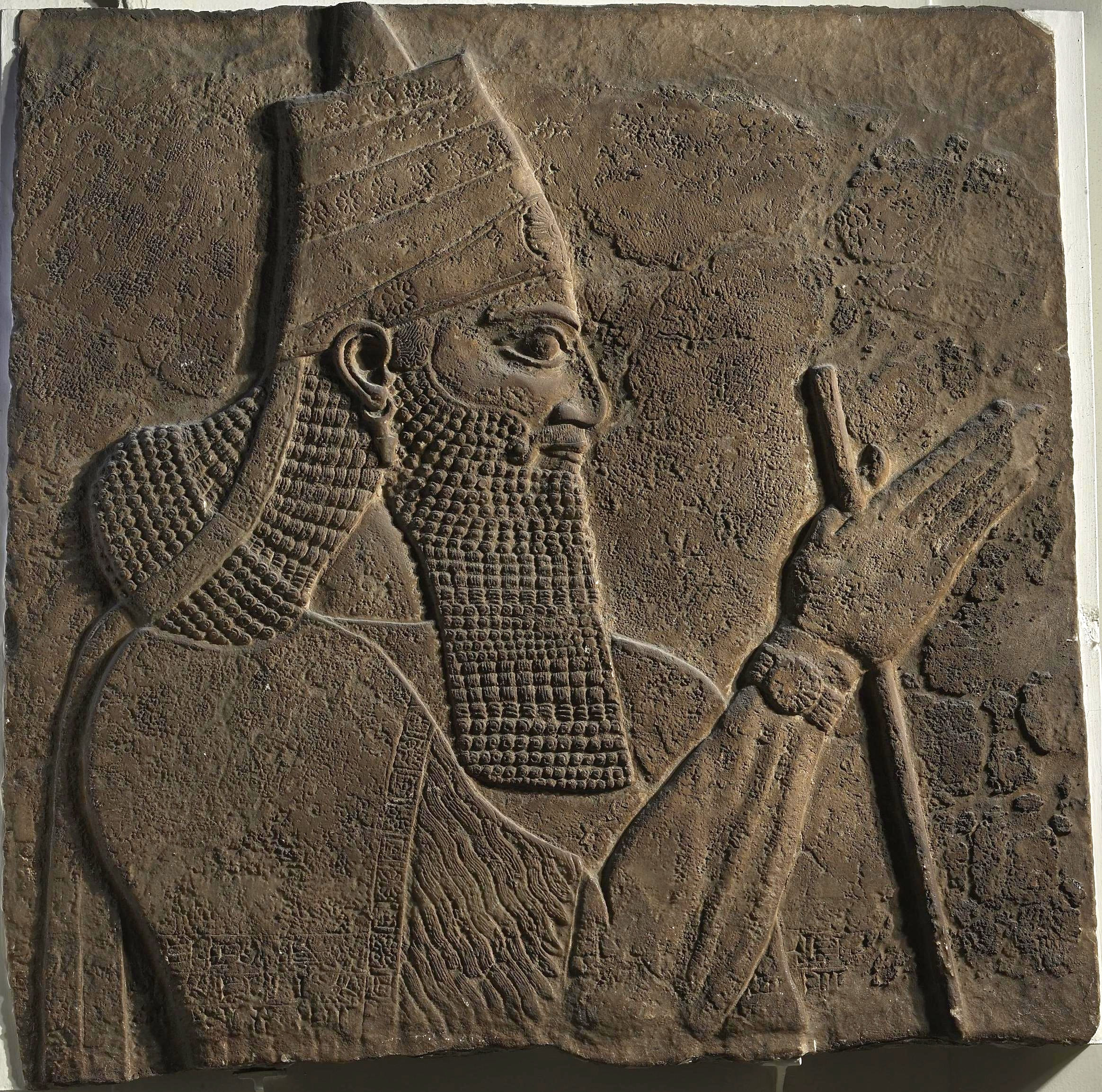
A partial relief of Tiglath-Pileser III, r. 745–727 BC, under whom the Neo-Assyrian Empire was consolidated, centralized and significantly expanded.

The Greeks used the terms "Syrian" and "Assyrian" interchangeably to indicate the indigenous Arameans, Assyrians and other inhabitants of the Levant and Mesopotamia, Herodotus considered "Syria" west of the Euphrates. Starting from the 2nd century BC onwards, ancient writers referred to the ruler of the Seleucid Empire as the King of Syria or King of the Syrians. The Seleucids designated the districts of Seleucis and Coele-Syria explicitly as Syria and ruled the Syrians as indigenous populations residing west of the Euphrates (Aramea) in contrast to Assyrians who had their native homeland in Mesopotamia east of the Euphrates. However, the interchangeability between Assyrians and Syrians persisted during the Hellenistic period.

In one instance, the Ptolemaic dynasty of the Hellenistic kingdom of Egypt applied the term "Syrian Village" as the name of a settlement in Fayoum. The Ptolemies referred to all peoples originating from Modern Syria and Palestine as Syrian.

The term Syrian was imposed upon Arameans of modern Levant by the Romans. Pompey created the province of Syria, which included modern-day Lebanon and Syria west of the Euphrates, framing the province as a regional social category with civic implications. In Roman usage, the term could refer narrowly to people of Aramean descent, but it was also applied more broadly to all inhabitants of the province, among them descendants of Greek and Italian settlers. Authors varied in their descriptions: Plutarch described the indigenous people of this newly created Roman province as "Syrians", so did Strabo, who observed that Syrians resided west of the Euphrates in Roman Syria, and he explicitly mentions that those Syrians are the Arameans, whom he calls Aramaei, indicating an extant ethnicity. Posidonius noted that the people called Syrians by the Greeks refer to themselves as Arameans. Tacitus also portrayed Syrians as a distinct ethnic group or race.

In The Jewish War, Josephus, a Hebrew historian native to the Levant, mentioned the Syrians as the non-Hebrew, non-Greek indigenous inhabitants of Syria.

== History ==
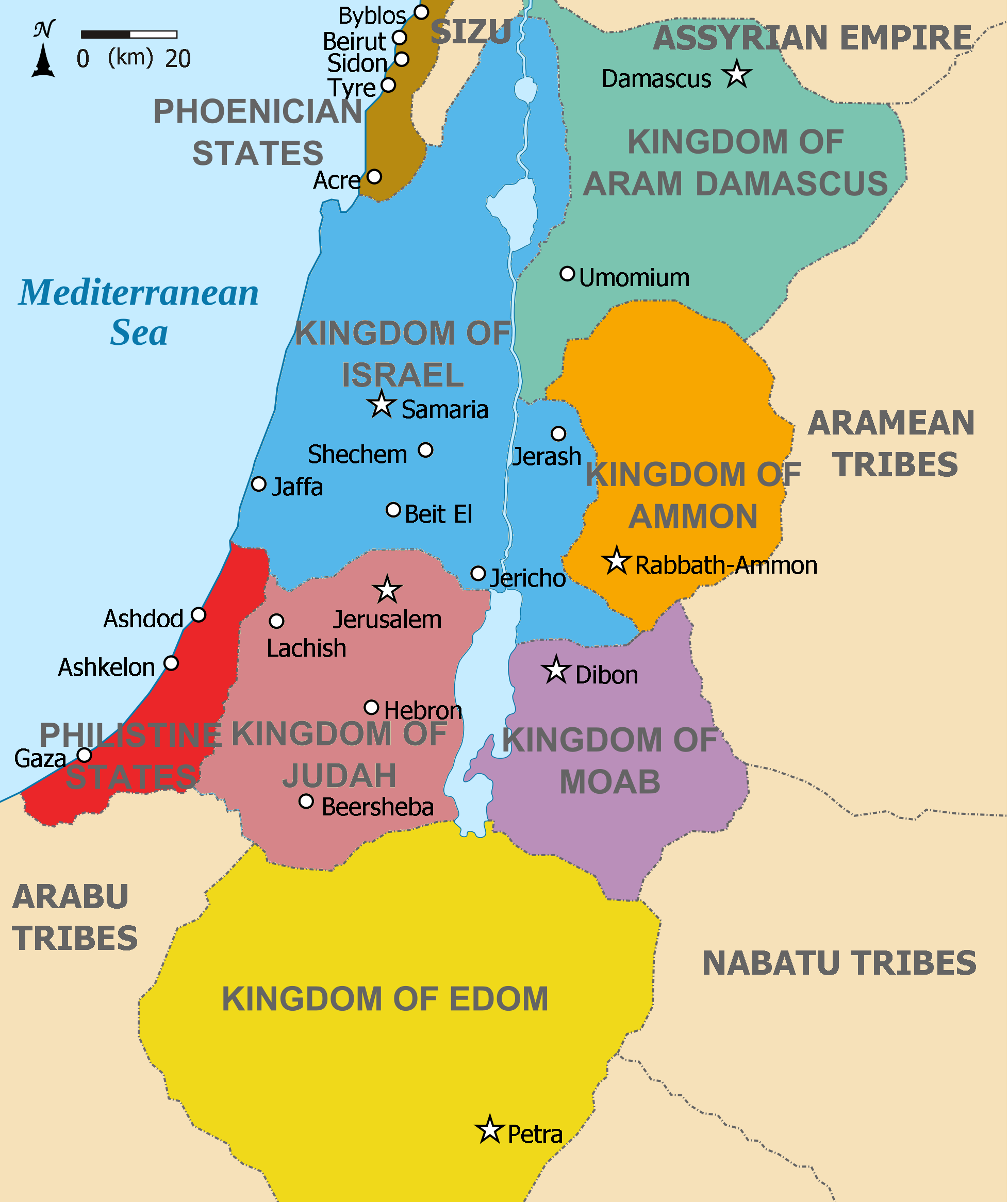
Aram-Damascus in 830 BCE.

Syrians are mainly descended from the various ancient Semitic-speaking peoples of the ancient Near East. The Seleucids ruled the indigenous peoples of the Levant, whom they named "Syrians", as a conquered nation; Syrians were not assimilated into Greek communities, and many local peasants were exploited financially as they had to pay rent for Greek landlords. Outside Greek colonies, the Syrians lived in districts governed by local temples that did not use the Greek civic system of poleis and colonies. The situation changed after the Roman conquest in 64 BC; Semitic-speaking Syrians obtained the citizenship of Greek poleis, and the line separating the Greeks and the natives blurred. The idioms Syrian and Greek were used by Rome to denote civic societies instead of separate ethnic groups.

Ancient Syria of the first millennium BC was dominated by the Aramaeans; they originated in the Northern Levant as a continuum of the Bronze Age populations of Syria. The Aramaeans assimilated most of the earlier Levantine populations through their language. With the adoption of a common religion, Christianity, most of the inhabitants turned into Syrians (Aramaeans). Islam and the Arabic language had a similar effect where the Aramaeans themselves became Arabs regardless of their ethnic origin following the Muslim conquest of the Levant. The presence of Arabs in Syria is recorded since the 9th century BC, and Roman period historians, such as Strabo, Pliny the Elder, and Ptolemy, reported that Arabs inhabited many parts of Syria, which according to modern historians indicate either an ethnic group or a nomadic way of life. (Note: What antiquity's writers meant by the designation "Arab" is debated; the historian Michael Macdonald suggested that the term is an ethnic designation based on an "ill-defined complex of linguistic and cultural characteristics", while according to academic consensus, "Arab", in addition to it being an ethnic name, had a social meaning describing a nomadic way of life.) The urheimat of the Arab ethnos is unclear; the traditional 19th century theory locates this in the Arabian Peninsula, while some modern scholars, such as David Frank Graf, note that the epigraphic and archaeological evidence render the traditional theory inadequate to explain the Arabs' appearance in Syria. (Note: Regarding the urheimat of the Arab ethnos: the traditional theory, which dates to the 19th century and became dominant in the middle of the 20th century, holds that Arabs were a Semitic wave from the Arabian peninsula who infiltrated Syria. The traditional theory does not explain the early presence of the Arabs in the Levant as it lacks the evidence for when and how they allegedly arrived from Arabia. Macdonald noted that there is no evidence proving that the inhabitants of the Arabian Peninsula, especially modern Yemen, in the early Hellenistic period (fourth century BC), used the designation "Arab", and that it took several centuries for this ethnic name to be adopted by the majority of the peninsula's inhabitants. The historian David Frank Graf considered the traditional theory inadequate for explaining the Arab presence in the Near East. Graf noted the 4th century BC evidence from Edom, south of the historical region of Syria, represented in a collection of ostraca, which show that the population was either "Arabized Edmoites" or "Edomite Arabs", and that this population was an integral part of the demography of southern Palestine and not a recent infiltration. The historian Robert Hoyland, noting the earliest attestation of Arabs in Assyrian sources in the Syrian desert in the 9th century, followed by their earliest attestation in Southern Arabian inscriptions in the seventh/sixth century BC, suggested that north and central Arabia was the homeland of Arabs. Macdonald refused the paradigm of infiltration from Arabia, and considered the Syria/Arabia division a Western concept that would have been unrecognizable for Arabs who were supposedly migrating.) The Arabs mentioned in Syria by Greco-Roman writers were assimilated into the newly formed "Greco–Aramaean culture" that dominated the region, and the texts they produced were written in Greek and Aramaic. Old Arabic, the precursor of Classical Arabic, was not a literary language; its speakers used Aramaic for writing purposes.

=== Linguistic Arabization ===
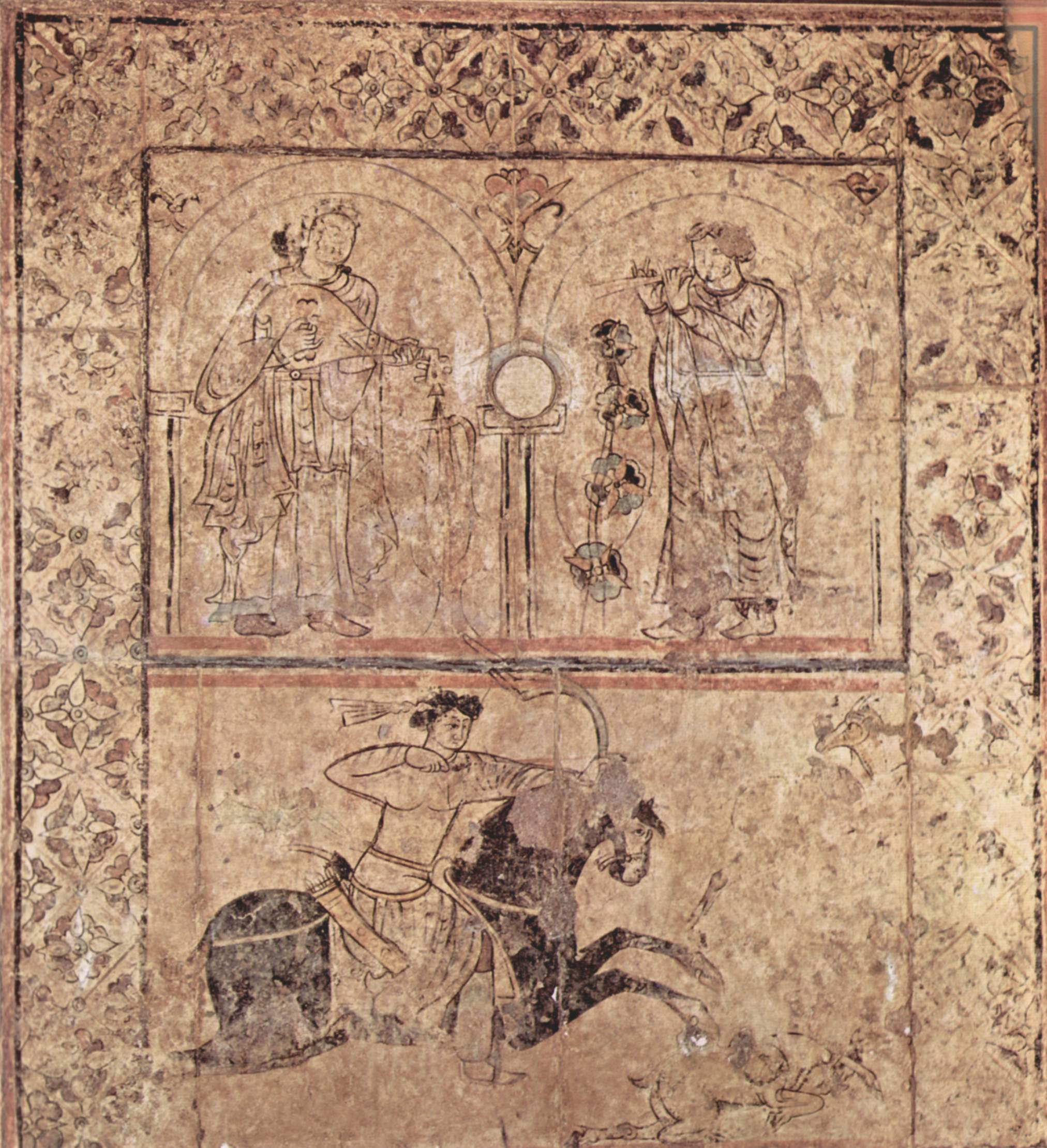
Umayyad fresco from Qasr al-Hayr al-Gharbî, built in the early 7th century.

On the eve of the Rashidun Caliphate conquest of the Levant, 634 AD, Syria's population mainly spoke Aramaic as the Lingua franca, while Greek was the language of administration. Arabization and Islamization of Syria began in the 7th century, and it took several centuries for Islam, the Arab identity, and language to spread; the Arabs of the caliphate did not attempt to spread their language or religion in the early periods of the conquest, and formed an isolated aristocracy. The Arabs of the caliphate accommodated many new tribes in isolated areas to avoid conflict with the locals; caliph Uthman ordered his governor, Muawiyah I, to settle the new tribes away from the original population. Syrians who belonged to Monophysitic denominations welcomed the Muslim Arabs as liberators.

The Abbasids in the eighth and ninth centuries sought to integrate the peoples under their authority, and the Arabization of the administration was one of their methods. Arabization gained momentum with the increasing numbers of Muslim converts from Christianity; the ascendancy of Arabic as the formal language of the state prompted the cultural and linguistic assimilation of Syrian converts. Some of those who remained Christian also became Arabized, while others stayed Aramean, it was probably during the Abbasid period in the ninth century that Christians adopted Arabic as their first language; the first translation of the gospels into Arabic took place in this century. Many historians, such as Claude Cahen and Bernard Hamilton, proposed that the Arabization of Christians was completed before the First Crusade. By the thirteenth century, the Arabic language achieved complete dominance in the region, with many of its speakers having become Arabs.

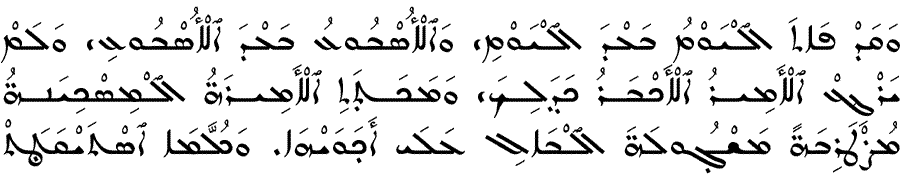
Garshuni sample

Those who retained the Aramaic language are divided among two groups:

- The Eastern Aramaic Syriac-speaking group, followers of the West Syriac Rite of the Syriac Orthodox Church and the Syrian Catholic Church; kept the pre-Islamic Syrian (Syriac) identity throughout the ages, asserting their culture in face of the Arab dominance. Linguists, such as Carl Brockelmann and François Lenormant, suggested that the rise of the Garshuni writing (using the Syriac alphabet to write Arabic) was an attempt by the Syriac Orthodox to assert their identity. Syriac is still the liturgical language for most of the different Syriac churches in Syria. The Syriac Orthodox Church was known as the Syrian Orthodox Church until 2000, when the holy synod decided to rename it to avoid any nationalistic connotations; the Catholic Church still has "Syrian" in its official name.
- The Western Neo-Aramaic-speaking group, that is, the inhabitants of Bakh'a, Jubb'adin and Ma'loula. The residents of Bakh'a and Jubb'adin converted to Islam in the eighteenth century (retaining their Aramean identity), while in Ma'loula, the majority are Christians, mainly belonging to the Melkite Greek Catholic Church, but also to the Greek Orthodox Church of Antioch, in addition to a Muslim minority, who speaks the same Aramaic dialect of the Christian residents. The people of those villages use Arabic intensively to communicate with each other and the rest of the country; this led to a noticeable Arabic influence on their Aramaic dialect where around 20% of its vocabulary is of Arabic roots. Bakh'a is steadily losing its dialect; by 1971, people aged younger than 40 could no longer use the Aramaic language properly, although they could understand it. The situation of Bakh'a might eventually lead to the extinction of its Aramaic dialect.

=== Revival of the designation "Syrian" ===
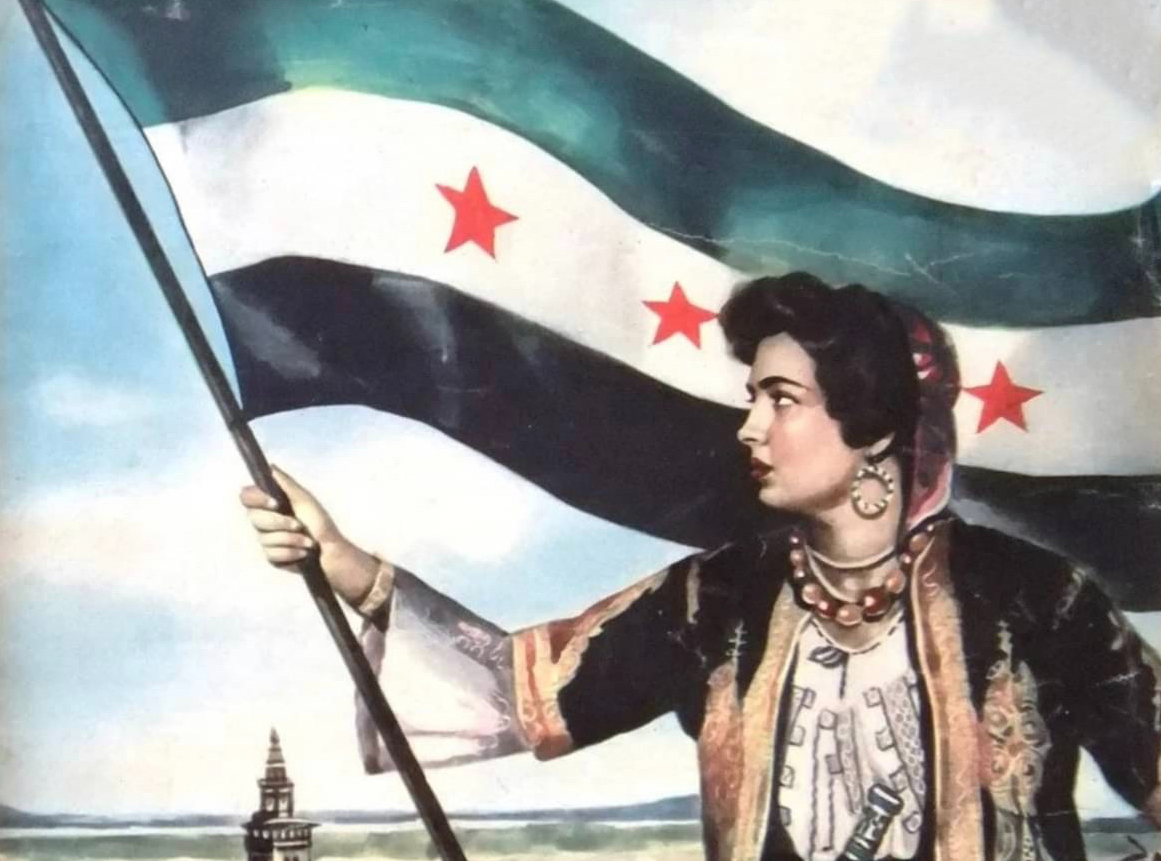
Portrait of a woman with the national flag of Syria, also known as "The Independence flag".

The Arabs in Arabia called the region of Syria region al-Sham (Arabic: بِـلَاد الـشَّـام, romanized: Bilād al-Šām, lit. 'the country of Sham') which became the dominant name of the Levant under the Rashidun Caliphate and its successors. The geographic designation "Syria" returned in 1864 when Ottoman Syria was reorganized and the name was used for a vilayet encompassing generally the southern Levant. The use of the national designation "Syrian" however has its origin in the tense relationship between the Arabic-speaking Muslims and Christians of the Levant, where Christians wanted to distance themselves from the Muslims. Already in the 1830s, the Lebanese traveler As'ad Khayyat identified with the term Syria, but it took till the 1880s for the name to begin to be widely used by the inhabitants to refer to themselves. Both Muslims and Christians agreed that the Muslims were not Syrians because they belonged to the Arabs while the Christians retained the Syrianism of antiquity. The spread of the Syrian "idea" amongst the Muslims can be traced to the efforts of Rashid Rida who contributed to the formulation of the Syrian Union Party's manifesto in 1918, demanding that Syria, in the aftermath of World War I and the Ottoman withdrawal from the region, become an independent state and not part of larger Arab one ruled by the Hashemites of the Kingdom of Hejaz. Rida did not reject the Arab identity but recognized a Syrian uniqueness and advocated the idea of a Syrian state. In the end, Syria did become a separate state but under the Hashemite king Faisal. He entered Damascus in 1918 in the aftermath of the Ottomans' evacuation of the Levant at the end of World War I. His entry ignited the Syrian national consciousness after he declared an Arab government in the Levant centred in Damascus with him as prince. In June 1919, the Syrian National Congress, which included representatives from Palestine and Lebanon, demanded the full independence of Syria, within borders that encompass more or less the Levant; this helped to further strengthen the development of the Syrian national consciousness. Initially, most inhabitants were against the establishment of Syria as they considered this a step against Arab unity, but gradually, Faisal's Syria, which was declared an independent kingdom in 1920, prompted the Syrians to begin exploring the notion of Syrianism instead of pan-Arabism. (Note: Even under Faisal, it was clear that the Arabic speakers in Syria considered themselves Syrians first and Arabs second; this is apparent in the response to the presence of Iraqi and other non-Syrian officials in Faisal's army and government. Syrians complained that they were becoming strangers in their own country, and slogans such as "Syria for Syrians" appeared in newspapers. The Syrian youth, an anti-Iraqi organization, was established declaring its desire to protect the rights of Syrians against non Syrians.) Faisal was deposed by the French who established a mandate in 1920, but the formation of a Syrian consciousness amongst the members of the Syrian Arab national movement solidified and spread amongst the Muslims as well as the Christians.

== Genetics ==
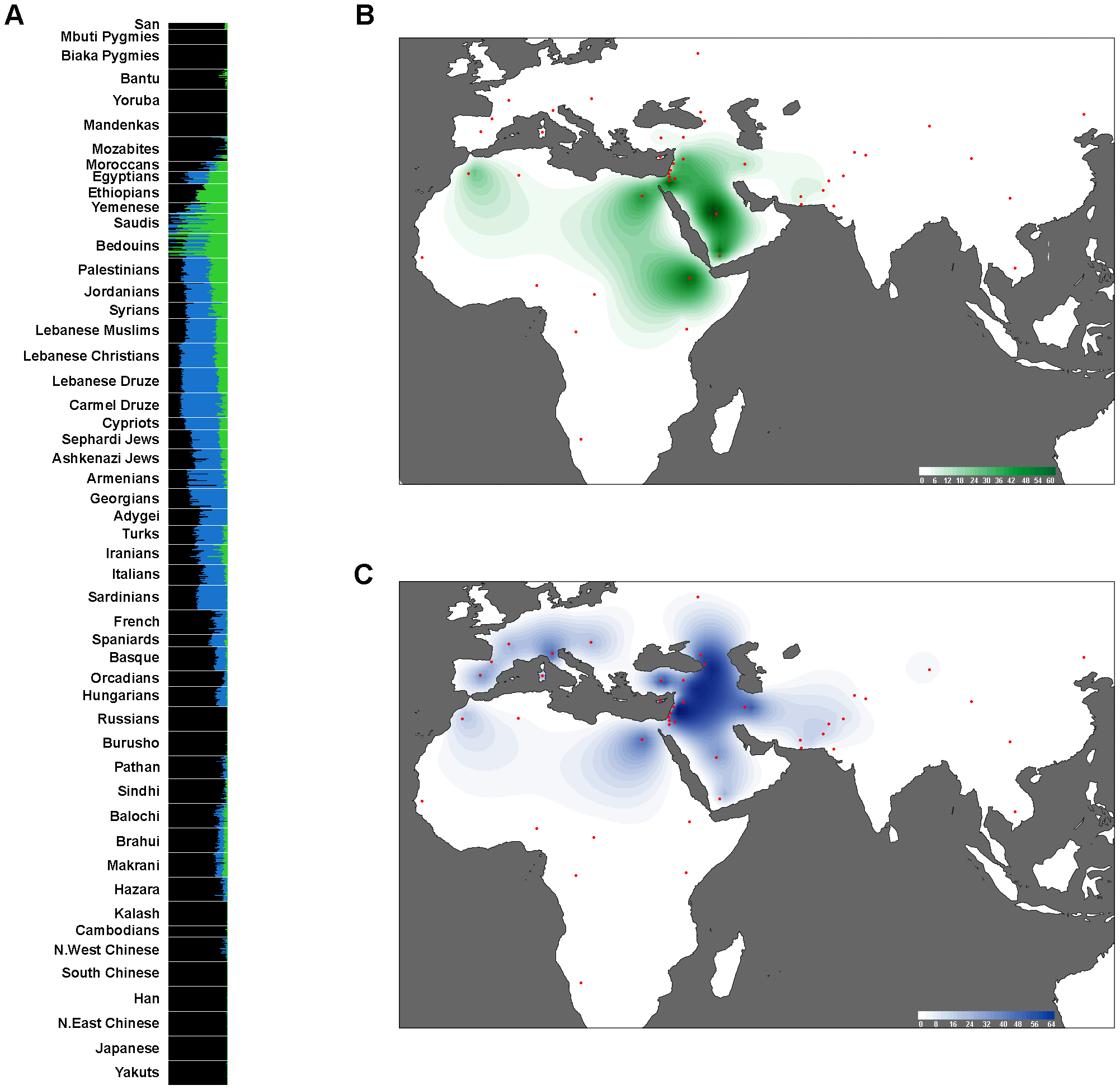
Arabian Peninsula/East African ancestral components Levantine ancestral component Other ancestral components

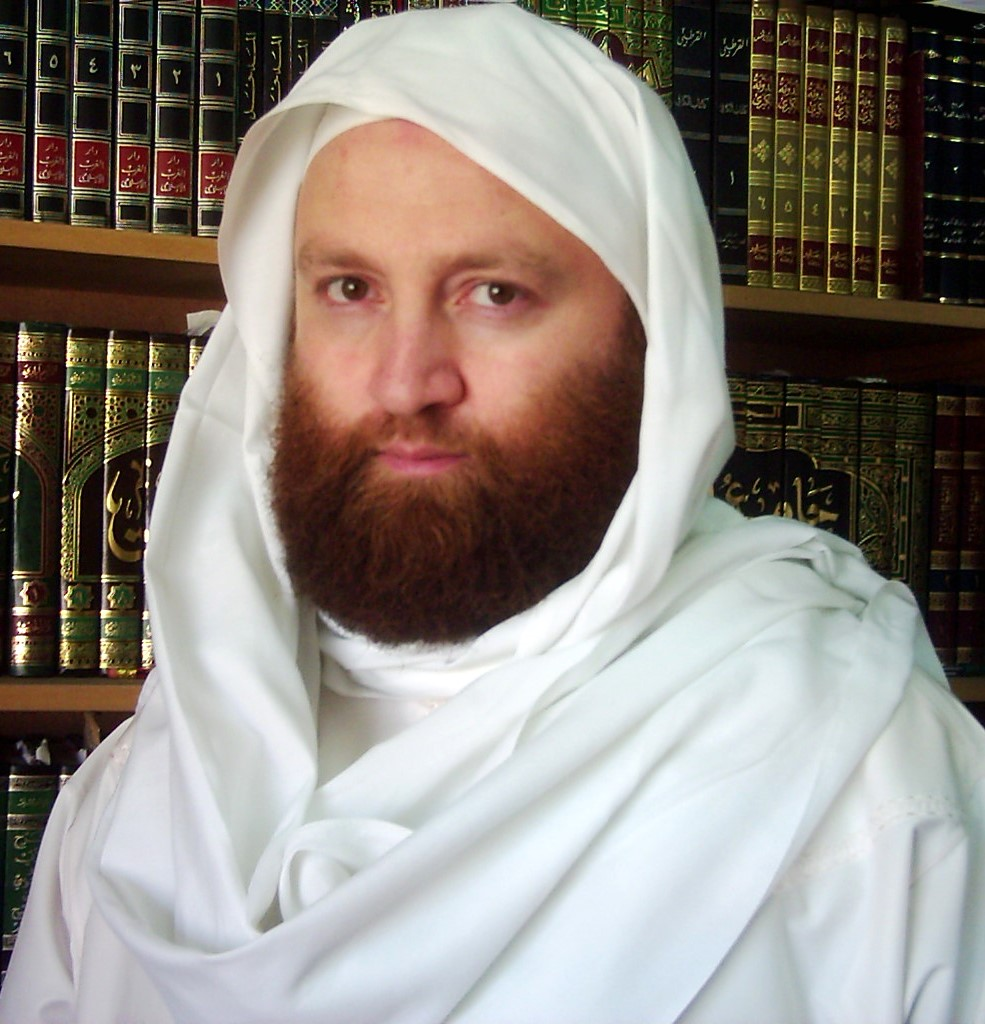
Syrian Dr. Khaldoun Al-Hassani Al-Jazairi in his home library.

Genetic tests on Syrians were included in many genetic studies. The genetic marker which identifies descendants of the ancient Levantines is found in Syrians in high proportion. Modern Syrians exhibit "high affinity to the Levant" based on studies comparing modern and ancient DNA samples. Syrians cluster closely with ancient Levantine populations of the Neolithic and Bronze Ages. A Levantine ancestral genetic component was identified; it is estimated that the Levantine, the Arabian and East African ancestral components diverged 23,700–15,500 years ago, while the divergence between the Levantine and European components happened 15,900–9,100 years ago. The Levantine ancestral component is the most recurrent in Levantines (42–68%); the Peninsular Arabian and East African ancestral components represent around 25% of Syrian genetic make-up. Syrians, among other Levantine groups, were found to derive 81–87% of their ancestry from Bronze age Levantines, relating to Canaanites as well as Kura–Araxes culture impact from before 2400 BCE; 8–12% from an East African source and 5–10% from Bronze age Europeans. Compared to the Lebanese, Bedouins and Palestinians, the Syrians have noticeably more Northern European component, estimated at 7%.

The paternal Y-DNA haplogroup J1, which reaches its highest frequencies in Yemen 72.6% and Qatar 58.3%, accounted for 33.6% of Syrians. The J2 group accounted for 20.8% of Syrians; other Y-DNA haplogroups include the E1B1B 12.0%, I 5.0%, R1a 10.0% and R1b 15.0%. The Syrians are closest to other Levantine populations: the Lebanese, the Palestinians and Jordanians; this closeness can be explained by the common Canaanite ancestry and geographical unity which was broken only in the twentieth century with the advent of British and French mandates. Regarding the genetic relation between the Syrians and the Lebanese based on Y-DNA, Muslims from Lebanon show closer relations to Syrians than their Christian compatriots. The people of Western Syria show close relations with the people of Northern Lebanon.

Mitochondrial DNA (mtDNA) analysis indicates that modern Syrian populations share a close genetic affinity with Europe, particularly through the prevalence of maternal haplogroups H and R. Based on Mitochondrial DNA, the Syrians, Palestinians, Lebanese and Jordanians form a close cluster. A study of mitochondrial DNA variation found that the Syrians have ~10%–15% of lineages of sub-Saharan African origin, consistent with female migration from eastern Africa into Near Eastern communities within the last few thousand years. It is likely this ancestry traces back to women brought from Africa as part of the Arab slave trade. Regarding the HLA alleles, Syrians, and other Levantine populations, exhibit "key differences" from other Arab populations; based on HLA-DRB1 alleles, Syrians were close to eastern Mediterranean populations, such as the Cretans and Lebanese Armenians. Studying the genetic relation between Jews and Syrians showed that the two populations share a close affinity. Apparently, the cultural influence of Arabian expansion in the Eastern Mediterranean in the seventh century was more prominent than the genetic influx. However, the expansion of Islam did leave an impact on Levantine genes; religion drove Levantine Muslims to mix with other Muslim populations, who were close culturally despite the geographic distance, and this produced genetic similarities between Levantine Muslims and Moroccan and Yemeni populations. Christians and Druze became a genetic isolate in the predominantly Islamic world.

== Language ==
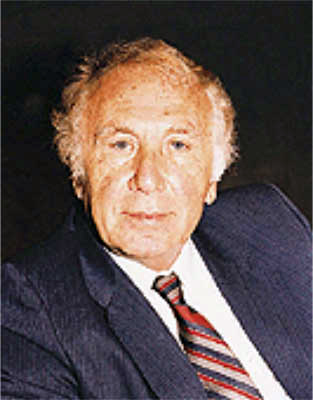
Syrian poet Nizar Qabbani wrote his works in the Arabic language was born into a Damascene Arab family. .

Arabic is the mother tongue of the majority of Syrians as well as the official state language. The Syrian variety of Levantine Arabic differs from Modern Standard Arabic. Western Neo-Aramaic, the only surviving Western Aramaic dialect, is still spoken in three villages (Maaloula, Bakh'a and Jubb'adin) in the Anti-Lebanon Mountains by both Muslim and Christian Arameans (Syriacs). Syriacs in the northeast of the country are mainly Turoyo-Aramaic speakers but there are also some speakers of Suret-Aramaic, especially in the Khabour Valley. Classical Syriac is also used as a liturgical language by Syriac Christians. English, and to a lesser extent French, is widely understood and used in interactions with tourists and other foreigners.

== Religion and minority groups ==
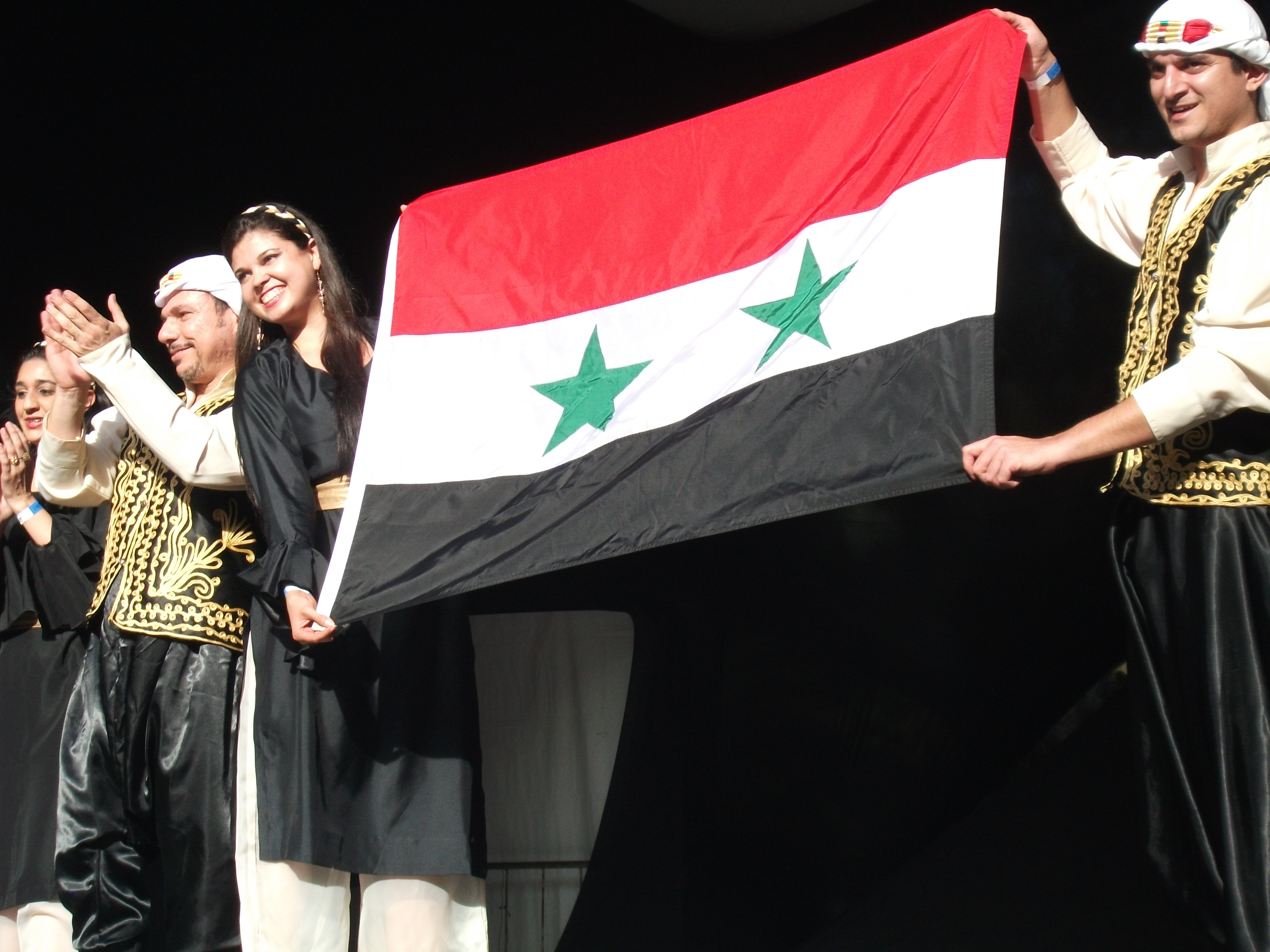
Syrian descendants in São Paulo

Clip – Interview with Paolo Dall'Oglio, The Syrian tradition of coexistence and the present scenario of confrontation

Religious differences in Syria have historically been tolerated, and religious minorities tend to retain distinct cultural, and religious identities. Sunni Islam is the religion of 74% of Syrians. Shia Muslims are mostly represented by the Ismailis, forming 3% of Syria's population. A small group of Shia Muslims (<2% of population) used to live in Damascus in Sayyidah Zaynab as well as in Idlib governorate around al-Fu'ah and Kafriya. The Alawites, a group distinct from Shia Islam, make up 12% of the population and mostly live in and around Tartus and Latakia. Christians make up 10% of the country. Most Syrian Christians adhere to the Byzantine Rite, the two largest groups being the Antiochian Orthodox Church and the Melkite Greek Catholic Church; the rest belong mainly to Oriental Orthodoxy, namely the Syriac Orthodox Church and the Armenian Apostolic Church. The Druze are a mountainous people who reside in Jabal al-Druze who helped spark the Great Syrian Revolt. Many Armenian and Assyrian Christians fled Turkey during the Armenian genocide and the Assyrian genocide and settled in Syria. There are also roughly 500,000 Palestinians, who are mostly descendants of refugees from the 1948 Israeli-Arab War. The community of Syrian Jews inside Syria once numbered 30,000 in 1947, but has only 200 today.

The Syrian people's beliefs and outlooks, similar to those of most Arabs and people of the wider Middle-East, are a mosaic of West and East. Conservative and liberally minded people will live right next to each other. Like the other countries in the region, religion permeates life; the government registers every Syrian's religious affiliation.

== Cuisine ==
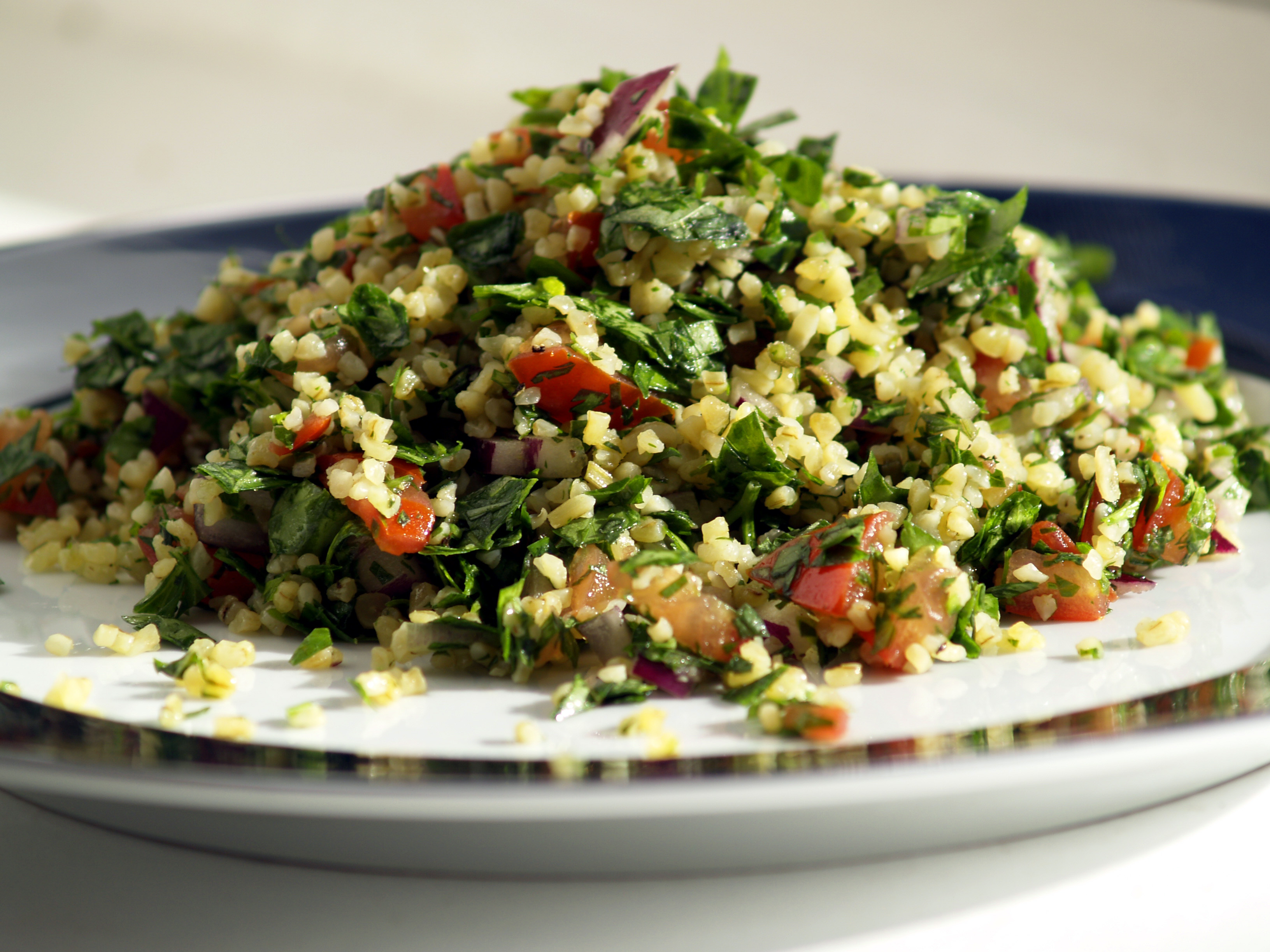
Tabbouleh

Syrian cuisine is dominated by ingredients native to the region. Olive oil, garlic, olives, spearmint, and sesame oil are some of the ingredients that are used in many traditional meals. Traditional Syrian dishes enjoyed by Syrians include, tabbouleh, labaneh, shanklish, wara' 'enab, makdous, kebab, Kibbeh, sfiha, moutabal, hummus, mana'eesh, bameh, and fattoush.

A typical Syrian breakfast is a meze. It is an assortment platter of foods with cheeses, meats, pickles, olives, and spreads. Meze is usually served with Arab-style tea – highly concentrated black tea, which is often highly sweetened and served in small glass cups. Another popular drink, especially with Christians and non-practicing Muslims, is the arak, a liquor produced from grapes or dates and flavored with anise that can have an alcohol content of over 90% ABV (however, most commercial Syrian arak brands are about 40–60% ABV).

== See also ==
- History of Syria
- Ottoman Syria
- Dobrujan Arabs
- Arameans
- Armenians
- Arabs
- Al-Shaitat
- Assyrians
- Greeks
