= Syria–European Union relations =

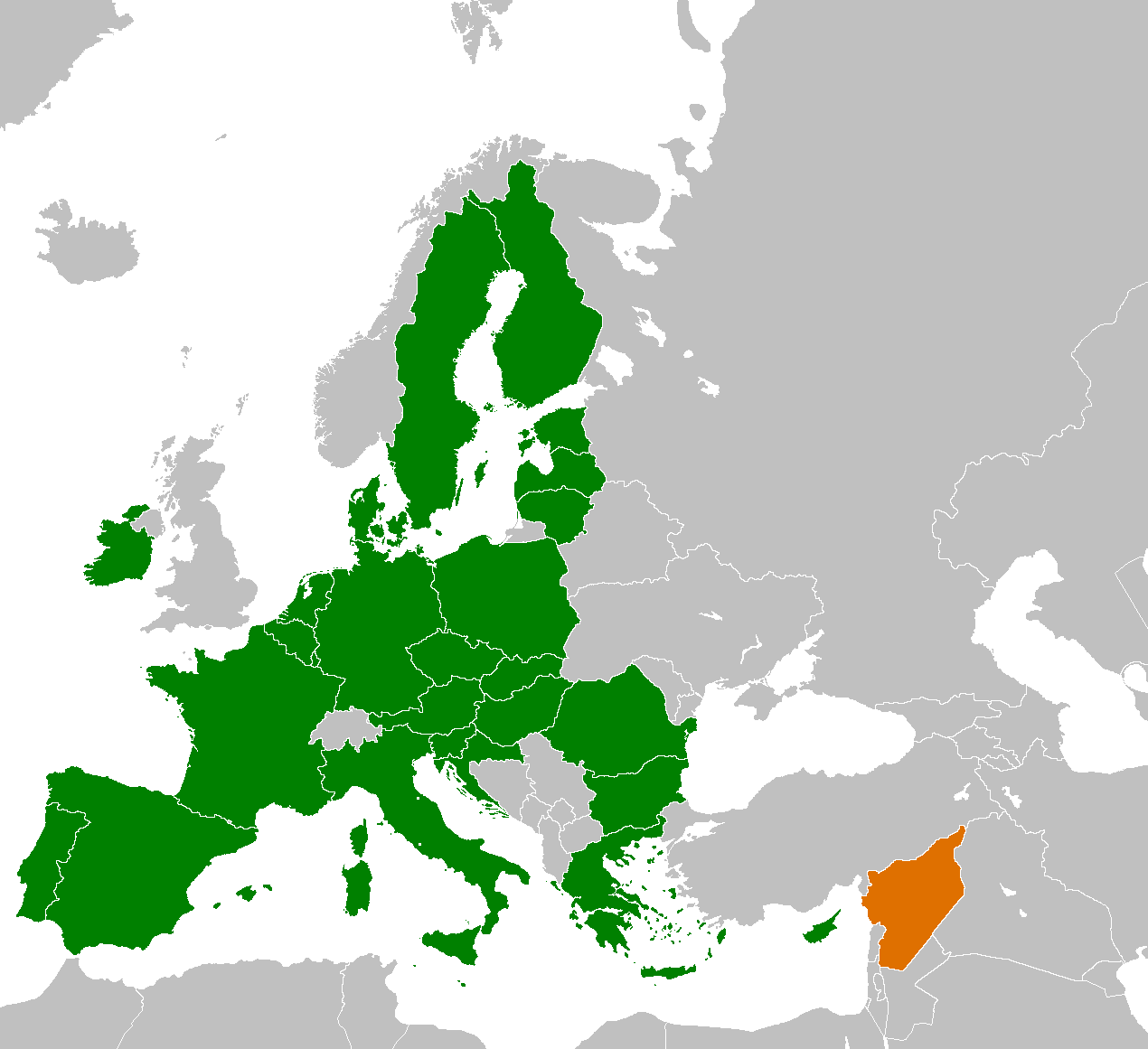
- European Union: Syria

Syria–European Union relations are the bilateral relations between Syria and the European Union (EU). The European Union (EU) and Syria have signed two agreements between each other. However, relations worsened significantly during the 2011 Syrian protests due to Bashar al-Assad's government's crackdown on its opposition, and the EU subsequently imposed an embargo on Syria. Since 2011, the EU has supported the opposition Syrian National Council and called for the Assad government to stand down. In 2012, it recognised the opposition groups as legitimate representatives of the Syrian people. Should Turkey, which is a candidate for EU membership, accede to the EU, Syria will be a border neighbor with the European Union.

Up until the fall of the Assad regime in 2024, several EU member states, including Austria, France, Germany, Denmark, Sweden, Belgium, Finland, Poland and the Netherlands, had their embassies in Damascus closed. The EU Delegation to Syria remained open until December 2012, when it was for security reasons relocated to Beirut. Syria has a permanent mission to the EU in Brussels. Following the opposition victory in December 2024, a new phase began for European-Syrian relations, and high-level talks and delegations resumed. The European Union affirmed its intention to provide aid to the Syrian transitional government, and announced plans to reopen its embassy in Damascus.

On 24 February 2025, the European Union announced the lifting of several Assad-era sanctions against Syria in an effort to help the country boost its economy and aid reconstruction efforts. This move was welcomed by the new Syrian government.

== Agreements ==
Between 1977 and 1978, the EU and Syria ratified and signed a Cooperation Agreement which governs relations, which serves as the foundation for EU-Syria relations. In 2007, the Country Strategy Paper (CSP) and National Indicative Programme (NIP) were implemented, which shaped the relationship between the EU and Syria up until 2012 and focused on political, economic and social reforms. Despite the non-democratic character of the Syrian government, the EU upheld its trade relations with the state without addressing continuing human rights violations. 2004 and 2008 saw further bilateral agreements between the EU and Syria.

In 2008, Syria also joined the EU's Union for the Mediterranean (and previously the Barcelona Process) and the European Neighbourhood Policy - but did not fully benefit pending the application of the EU-Syria Association Agreement (also includes a Free Trade Agreement) which was signed in 2009, but never ratified by Syria. Since 2011, the Euro-Mediterranean Agreement establishing an Association (EMAA) is frozen. Syria was suspended from the Union for the Mediterranean in 2011.

All cooperation programmes and agreements were suspended or frozen in 2011.

On 11 May 2026, the Council of the European Union adopted a resolution which ended the partial suspension of the Cooperation Agreement.

== Diplomatic ties ==
=== Syrian Civil War ===
Following the Syrian civil uprising in spring 2011 and the resulting escalation of violence and human rights violations, the EU suspended bilateral cooperation with the Syrian government and froze the draft Association Agreement. Since then, the EU has also suspended the participation of Syrian authorities in its regional programmes. The European Investment Bank (EIB) has suspended all loan operations and technical assistance. The EU established and then expanded targeted sanctions, including an arms embargo, asset freeze and travel ban on government members, and an oil embargo. Syria consequently suspended its membership of and participation in the Union for the Mediterranean. The EU Delegation in Syria remained open until December 2012. In December 2012, the EU accepted the National Coalition for Syrian Revolutionary and Opposition Forces as "legitimate representatives" of the Syrian people.

In 2013, a disagreement between EU member states about whether Syrian rebel groups should be supported, resulted in relieving islamist rebel groups from the arm embargo. The EU's approach towards to Syrian crisis changed in 2014 when the terror organisation ISIS gained power. The EU shifted its focus from the Syrian government towards the fight against the Islamic State due to increasing security concerns. Actions implemented by the EU included humanitarian aid and support for the islamist rebel groups.

Even though the EU states never actively took part in military actions in Syria, they supported already existing rebel groups in Syria and the US-led coalition through financial and material assistance. The EU is a member of the Friends of Syria Group.

=== Post-Assad regime ===
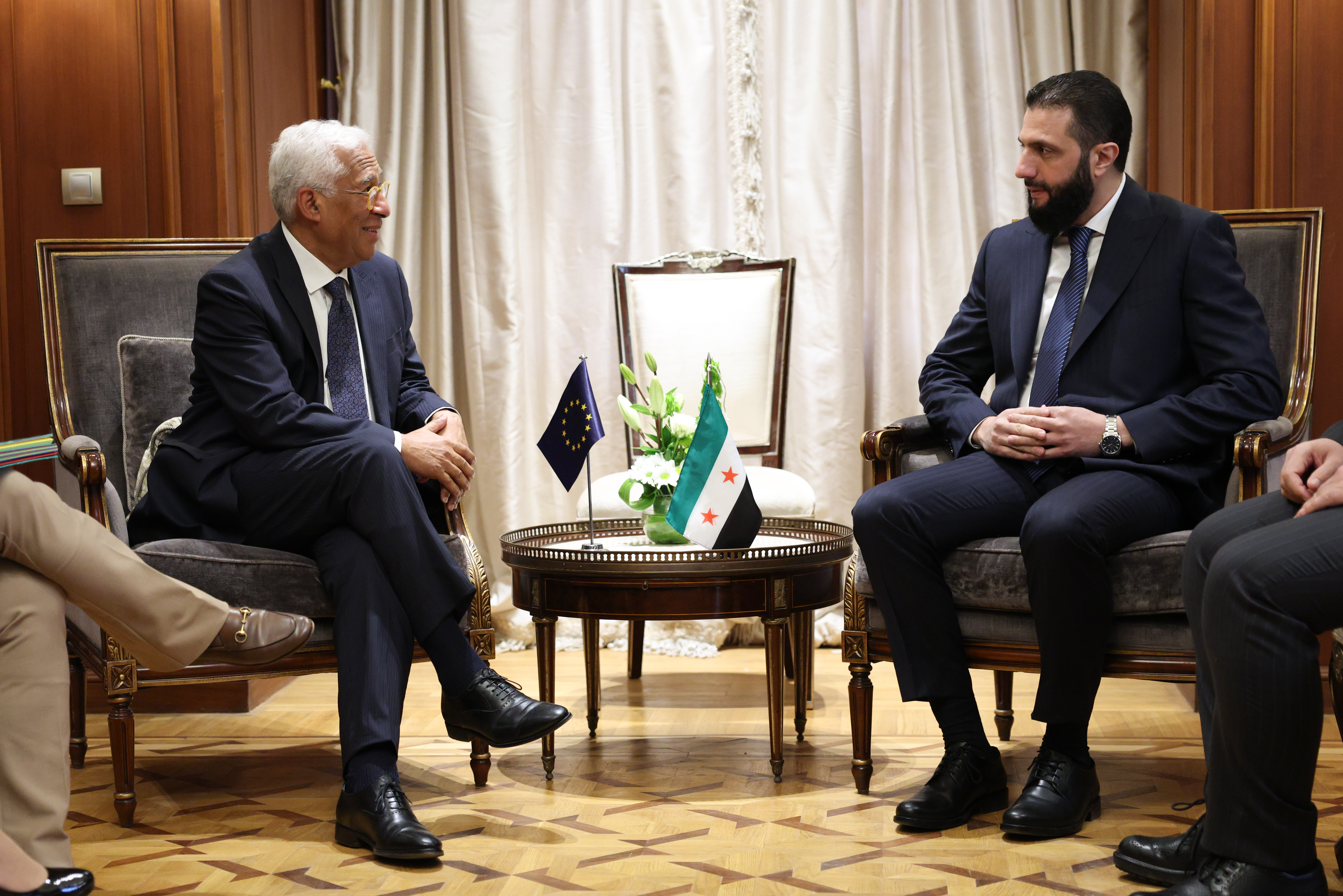
President of the European Council, António Costa, meets with Syrian President Ahmed al-Sharaa at the Emergency Summit of the League of Arab States on Gaza, 3 March 2025.

After the fall of the Assad regime, Germany and France became the first European Union countries to visit Damascus, marking a significant step in their diplomatic engagement with Syria.

In January 2025, EU High Representative Kaja Kallas announced that certain sanctions on specific sectors would be temporarily reduced in a 'step-by-step' process. This process would depend on conditions such as human rights protections, explicitly those for ethnic and religious minorities as well as for women. She mentioned this plan was still subject to negotiations in Brussels, citing 'technical issues', and that the blacklist of (former) officials and organisations connected to the Assad regime would remain. Caspar Veldkamp, foreign minister of the Netherlands, added that certain sanctions, such as those on weapons exports, would stay and that restrictions on HTS would not be lifted in this stage, adding "They’re the new ones in power. We want to see how their words are translated into actions". He also mentioned that the EU is demanding there be no place for extremism or [Assad's] former allies Russia and Iran.

Syrian foreign minister Shibani reportedly called the EU decision a 'positive step'.

On 24 February 2025, Kaja Kallas announced that the European Union lifted sanctions against Syria in some key sectors, such as energy, transport, and banking. On 11 March 2025, Kallas condemned "in the strongest terms" the attacks by pro-Assad militias on Syrian government forces during clashes in western Syria and "welcomed" Syrian President Ahmed al-Sharaa's commitment to launch an investigation into the massacres of Alawite civilians by pro-government Islamist fighters. However, the European Union pledged €2.5 billion to Syria for aid. President of the European Council António Costa and President of the European Commission Ursula von der Leyen traveled to Damascus on 9 January 2026, to meet with Syrian President Ahmed al-Sharaa. This visit was the highest-level EU visit to Syria since the overthrow of the Bashar al-Assad regime in December 2024.

== Trade ==
Before the war, the EU was Syria's largest trading partner with €3.6 billion worth of EU goods exports to Syria and €3.5 billion of Syrian exports to the EU. Total trade was worth €7.18 billion in 2010 and the EU is Syria's largest trading partner with 22.5% of its trade (Syria is the EU's 50th). Bilateral trade has contracted since the war to €1.45 billion in 2013, a drop of 91% of exports from Syria and of 61% of exports from the EU compared to 2011. However, the volume of trade has started to rise in recent years, e.g. in 2018 it was 50% higher than their low in 2016.

== Syria's foreign relations with EU member states ==
- Austria
- Belgium
- Bulgaria
- Croatia
- Cyprus
- Czech Republic
- Denmark
- Estonia
- Finland
- France
- Germany
- Greece
- Hungary
- (Republic of Ireland) Ireland
- Italy
- Latvia
- Lithuania
- Luxembourg
- Malta
- Netherlands
- Poland
- Portugal
- Romania
- Slovakia
- Slovenia
- Spain
- Sweden

== See also ==
- Foreign relations of Syria
- Foreign relations of the European Union
