= Syrians in Germany =

Residents of Germany of Syrian descent

Syrer in Deutschland
- Distribution of Syrian citizens in Germany (2021)

Total population
- 1,281,000 (2025)

Regions with significant populations
- Berlin, Frankfurt, Hanover, Munich, Stuttgart, Cologne, Salzgitter, Dortmund

Languages
- Arabic, Kurdish, Turkish, Neo-Aramaic, Armenian, German

Religion
- Majority: Sunni Islam; Minority: Twelver Shia, Alevism, Alawites, Sufism, Isma'ilism; Christianity (mainly Syriac Orthodox Church, minorities Eastern Catholic Churches, Oriental Orthodoxy); Druze

Syrians in Germany (Arabic: السوريون في ألمانيا, romanized: al-Sūrīyūn fī Almāniyā) refers to Syrian immigrants in Germany, or Germans with Syrian ancestry. The number of people with an immigration background from Syria, including those with German citizenship, was estimated at around 1,281,000 in 2025. Additionally, the population with Syrian citizenship residing in Germany is 936,285 in 2025, making it the third-largest group of foreign nationals living in the country. Notably, Germany boasts by far the largest Syrian diaspora outside of the Middle East.

The population consists mainly of refugees from the Syrian Civil War, who arrived during the 2015 European migrant crisis. In 2018, Germany granted 72% of Syrian refugees protection for the right to work without any setbacks or restrictions. Significant Syrian communities exist in Berlin, especially in the district of Neukölln, and in the Ruhr-Area. After fall of the Assad regime, German government stated that the Syrian authorities aim to encourage the return of up to one million Syrian workers to help their economic and reconstruction efforts. However, discussions surrounding the topic have faced criticism, as many refugees arrived as children and later acquired professional qualifications, such as in engineering, through the national education funding. Critics argue that large-scale returns could worsen shortages of medical personnel and skilled workers in Germany. Experts also note that although many refugees express a desire to eventually return home after their children graduate, the lack of infrastructure, basic services, and employment opportunities in Syria means that no concrete mechanisms for large-scale voluntary repatriation have yet been established. As a result, the majority of immigrants currently still plan to remain in Germany.

== Migration history ==
=== Pre-civil war migration ===
Even before the outbreak of the Syrian civil war in 2011, Germany had a significant population of Syrian migrants, with religious and ethnic minorities such as Assyrians over-represented in the population. Many opponents of the regime in former Ba'athist Syria under Bashar Al Assad, especially Syrian Sunni Muslims and Palestinians have also sought refuge in Germany.

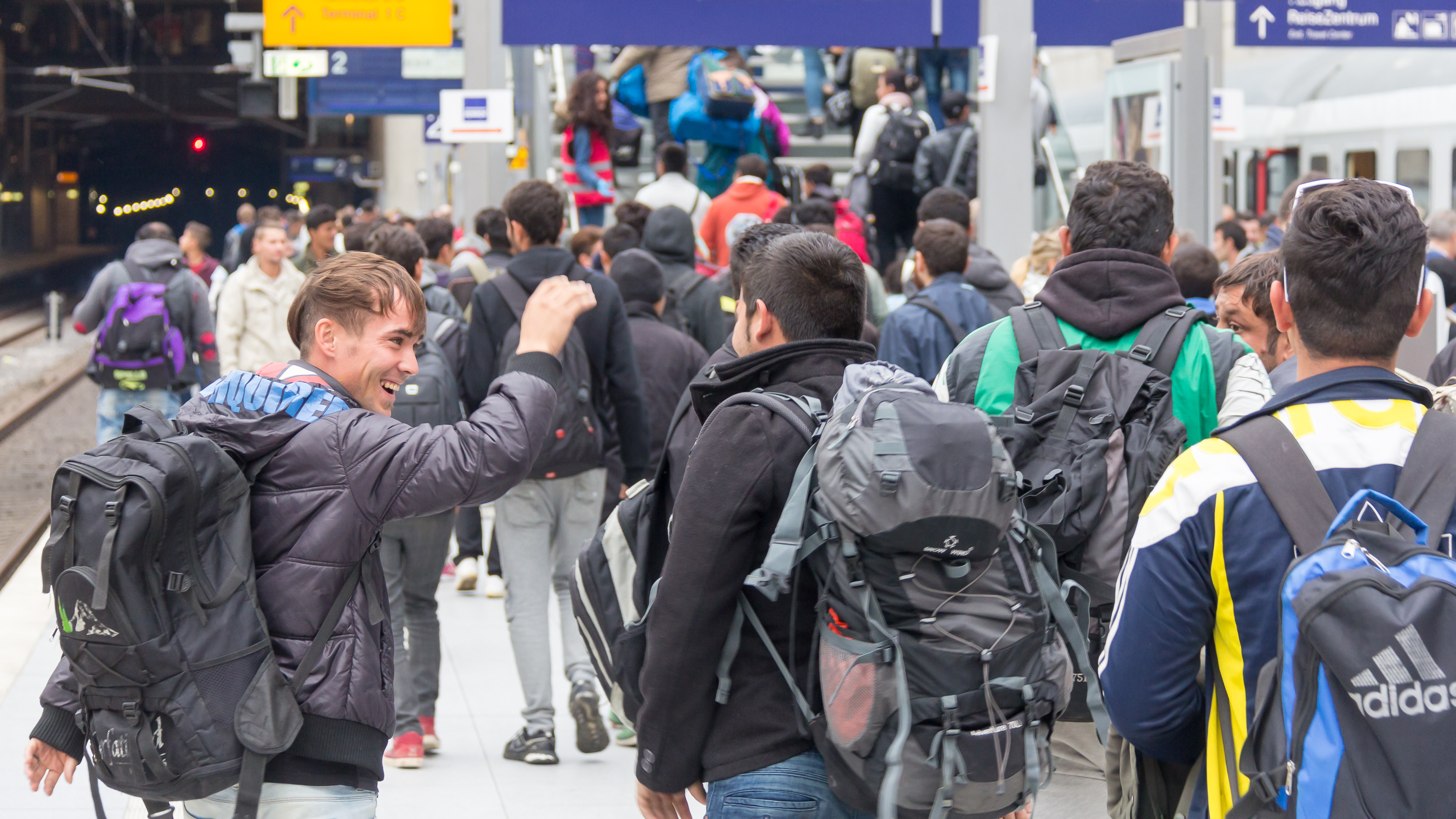
Syrian refugees arrive in Cologne (2015)

=== Migration during the civil war ===
However, the overwhelming majority of Syrians who have arrived in Germany migrated to the country after the outbreak of the Syrian Civil War in 2011. During the European migrant crisis of 2014-2015, hundreds of thousands of Syrian refugees of the Syrian Civil War entered Germany to seek refugee status. The European migrant crisis was eased on September 4, 2015, by Chancellor Werner Faymann of Austria and Chancellor Angela Merkel of Germany. They announced that migrants would be allowed to cross the border from Hungary into Austria and onward to Germany. On the morning of September 5, 2015, buses with migrants began crossing the Austro-Hungarian border.

Germany's number of asylum applicants, mostly consisting of Syrians, peaked at 890,000 in 2015, however, the trend began to reverse. In 2018 for instance, only 185,000 Syrians applied for asylum in Germany, although Syrians still continue to be the far largest group of asylum seekers since 2013.

Most Syrians have been granted subsidiary protection, which makes them a permanent resident with the right to work and eligible for German citizenship after 5 years of residency. In 2023, they were by far the biggest group of foreign nationals receiving German citizenship.

=== Fall of the regime ===
After the Fall of Damascus on 7 December 2024 and Bashar al-Assad fleeing to Moscow, several thousand exiled Syrians living in Germany celebrated the fall of the Assad family. Following the fall of Assad regime, right-wing politicians campaigning for Germany´s 2025 election asked for the 973,905 Syrians in Germany to return to Syria.

While others feared that the Sunni Islamist HTS rebels, in charge after the fall of the regime, may not be willing to honor fundamental rights like freedom of religion and warned of hasty returns. The processing of new applications for asylum for Syrians was halted by the Federal Office for Migration and Refugees.

On 31 March 2025, 244,178 Syrians were working full time jobs in Germany. About 80,000 of them were working jobs which were traditionally subject to staffing shortages, according to estimates by the German Economic Institute. By July 2025 some 480,000 Syrians in Germany lived on benefits, like the Bürgergeld.

By 2026 some 1,63 million former refugees had returned to Syria, only 3,700 of them were from Germany. Looking at the low numbers, Malte Fischer concluded in May 2026 that the generous German benefit system and the state's inability to deport people was to blame.

== Demographics ==
Syrian Nationals in Germany
| Year | Pop. | ±% |
|---|---|---|
| 2010 | 30,133 | — |
| 2011 | 32,878 | +9.1% |
| 2012 | 40,360 | +22.8% |
| 2013 | 56,933 | +41.1% |
| 2014 | 118,196 | +107.6% |
| 2015 | 366,556 | +210.1% |
| 2016 | 637,845 | +74.0% |
| 2017 | 698,950 | +9.6% |
| 2018 | 745,645 | +6.7% |
| 2019 | 789,465 | +5.9% |
| 2020 | 818,460 | +3.7% |
| 2021 | 867,585 | +6.0% |
| 2022 | 923,805 | +6.5% |
| 2023 | 972,460 | +5.3% |
| 2024 | 975,060 | +0.3% |
| 2025 | 936,285 | −4.0% |

According to the 2010 Microcensus of the Federal Statistical Office of Germany (Destatis), approximately 57,000 people with a Syrian migration background lived in Germany in 2010, including around 30,000 Syrian nationals.

Based on Germany’s Central Register of Foreigners, the number of Syrian citizens residing in Germany increased significantly following the outbreak of the Syrian civil war in 2011. The Syrian population in Germany grew from 30,133 individuals in 2010 to 975,060 by 31 December 2024, making Syrians one of the country’s largest groups of foreign nationals.

The number of Syrian citizens subsequently declined to 936,285 by 31 December 2025, largely due to increasing rates of naturalization among Syrian nationals. During 2025, tens of thousands of Syrians acquired German citizenship and were therefore no longer included in statistics concerning foreign citizens.

According to data from the Federal Office for Migration and Refugees (BAMF) on first-time Syrian asylum applicants in Germany between 2013 and 2025, approximately 64.5% identified as Arabs and 27.7% as Kurds. Around 1.3% belonged to other ethnic groups (including Syriacs, and Turkmens), while the ethnicity of 6.5% of applicants was unknown.

In terms of religious affiliation, Muslims made up the majority of first-time Syrian asylum applicants in Germany between 2010 and 2025. According to the report, 88.9% of Syrian applicants professed Islam. Christians represented a religious minority at 2.6%, followed by Yazidis at 2.0%. Approximately 0.7% of applicants stated that they did not belong to any religion. For 5.8%, their religious affiliation was either unknown or they belonged to other or unspecified religious communities.

The following table provides an overview of the ethnicity of first-time asylum applicants from Syria, according to the BAMF:

| Year | first-time applicants | Arabs | Kurds | Syriacs | Turkmens | Palestinians | other | unknown |
|---|---|---|---|---|---|---|---|---|
| 2013 | 11,851 | 38.4 % | 49.0 % | 2.8 % | | | 7.0 % | 2.8 % |
| 2014 | 39,332 | 54.9 % | 34.8 % | 1.1 % | | | 2.5 % | 6.7 % |
| 2015 | 158,657 | 66.6 % | 24.9 % | 0.4 % | | | 1.2 % | 6.9 % |
| 2016 | 266,250 | 65.3 % | 29.0 % | | | 0.4 % | 0.9 % | 4.4 % |
| 2017 | 48,974 | 56.6 % | 36.3 % | | | 0.4 % | 1.1 % | 5.6 % |
| 2018 | 44,167 | 56.1 % | 31.1 % | | | 0.3 % | 1.0 % | 11.5 % |
| 2019 | 39,270 | 56.6 % | 31.3 % | | 0.3 % | | 0.7 % | 11.1 % |
| 2020 | 36,433 | 58.3 % | 29.2 % | | 0.3 % | | 0.6 % | 11.6 % |
| 2021 | 54,903 | 64.4 % | 26.6 % | | 0.2 % | | 0.5 % | 8.3 % |
| 2022 | 70,976 | 69.5 % | 23.4 % | | 0.2 % | | 0.5 % | 6.4 % |
| 2023 | 102,930 | 71.8 % | 21.8 % | | 0.5 % | | 0.5 % | 5.4 % |
| 2024 | 76,765 | 70.5 % | 22.9 % | | 0.3 % | | 0.4 % | 5.9 % |
| 2025 | 23,256 | 58.1 % | 33.8 % | | 0.3 % | | 0.7 % | 7.1 % |

The following table provides an overview of the religious affiliation of first-time asylum applicants from Syria according to the BAMF:

| Year | first-time applicants | Muslims | Christians | Yazidis | non-denominational | other/ unknown |
|---|---|---|---|---|---|---|
| 2010 | 1,490 | 774 | 112 | 546 | 15 | 43 |
| 2011 | 2,634 | 1,395 | 97 | 1,031 | 27 | 84 |
| 2012 | 6,201 | 3,484 | 947 | 1,573 | 26 | 171 |
| 2013 | 11,851 | 7,825 | 1,590 | 2,050 | 74 | 312 |
| 2014 | 39,332 | 32,477 | 1,922 | 2,052 | 285 | 2,596 |
| 2015 | 158,657 | 136,743 | 6,198 | 3,495 | 1,161 | 11,060 |
| 2016 | 266,250 | 243,691 | 6,837 | 4,107 | 1,824 | 9,791 |
| 2017 | 48,974 | 43,620 | 1,141 | 1,290 | 361 | 2,562 |
| 2018 | 44,167 | 37,257 | 786 | 669 | 341 | 5,114 |
| 2019 | 39,270 | 33,163 | 655 | 573 | 293 | 4,586 |
| 2020 | 36,433 | 30,982 | 518 | 601 | 231 | 4,101 |
| 2021 | 54,903 | 48,699 | 772 | 520 | 321 | 4,591 |
| 2022 | 70,976 | 65,556 | 895 | 366 | 340 | 3,819 |
| 2023 | 102,930 | 96,819 | 1,467 | 366 | 469 | 3,809 |
| 2024 | 76,765 | 71,746 | 1,152 | 320 | 414 | 3,133 |
| 2025 | 23,256 | 20,967 | 448 | 260 | 366 | 1,215 |
| 2010–2025 | 984,089 | 875,198 | 25,537 | 19,819 | 6,548 | 56,987 |

=== Settlement patterns ===
A large proportion of Syrians have settled in large West German cities, particularly in the Ruhr area and Berlin, where there was already a large Arab-Levantine community, consisting mainly of Lebanese and Palestinian migrants who arrived in the 1980s. However, there is also a sizeable Syrian community in eastern Germany, particularly in the largest cities such as Leipzig and Dresden, where they are the largest non-European immigrant group.

Number of Syrians in larger cities
| # | City | People |
|---|---|---|
| 1. | Berlin | 39,813 |
| 2. | Bremen | 17,435 |
| 3. | Hamburg | 16,725 |
| 4. | Essen | 13,076 |
| 5. | Bonn | 9,428 |
| 6. | Duisburg | 9,323 |
| 7. | Leipzig | 9,059 |
| 8. | Bochum | 8,375 |
| 9. | Cologne | 8,074 |
| 10. | Dortmund | 7,791 |

== Naturalizations ==
From 2020 to 2025, around 298,400 people of Syrian origin acquired German citizenship. The sharp increase is mainly due to the Syrian civil war, which began in 2011 and triggered a large flight movement. In the years 2014 to 2016, the so-called migration crisis reached its peak, as a result of which many Syrians came to Germany and were later naturalized.

Naturalization of Syrian nationals in Germany (since 1981)
| Year | 1980 | 1981 | 1982 | 1983 | 1984 | 1985 | 1986 | 1987 | 1988 | 1989 |
|---|---|---|---|---|---|---|---|---|---|---|
| Number | | 259 | 182 | 203 | 244 | 256 | 276 | 297 | 338 | 354 |
| Year | 1990 | 1991 | 1992 | 1993 | 1994 | 1995 | 1996 | 1997 | 1998 | 1999 |
| Number | 334 | 393 | 475 | 626 | 678 | 602 | 645 | 672 | 886 | 811 |
| Year | 2000 | 2001 | 2002 | 2003 | 2004 | 2005 | 2006 | 2007 | 2008 | 2009 |
| Number | 1.609 | 1.337 | 1.158 | 1.157 | 1.070 | 1.061 | 1.226 | 1.108 | 1.156 | 1.342 |
| Year | 2010 | 2011 | 2012 | 2013 | 2014 | 2015 | 2016 | 2017 | 2018 | 2019 |
| Number | 1.401 | 1.454 | 1.321 | 1.508 | 1.820 | 2.027 | 2.263 | 2.479 | 2.880 | 3.860 |
| Year | 2020 | 2021 | 2022 | 2023 | 2024 | 2025 | | | | |
| Number | 6.700 | 19.095 | 48.385 | 75.485 | 83.185 | 65.574 | | | | |

== Integration ==
Although most Syrians automatically receive the right to work under German law, many German politicians and journalists have criticised the relatively high level of benefit dependency among Syrian migrants. In 2023, after most had been in Germany for 8 years, 55% of Syrians were dependent on benefits, compared to 5.3% of their German counterparts.

The relatively high crime rate among Syrians, especially among young Syrian men, has also been the subject of political debate. In June 2024, after an 18-year-old Syrian killed a 20-year-old man in the town of Bad Oeynhausen who had just returned from a school graduation ceremony, many politicians in Germany called for deportations to Syria, especially of those involved in criminal activities. Discussing the murder, the Minister-President of North Rhine-Westphalia Hendrik Wüst called for deportations of foreign nationals, "regardless of where they are from". Several days later German chancellor Olaf Scholz also called for deportations to Syria, although Germany has no official embassy in the country since the outbreak of the civil war.

== Notable people (extract) ==
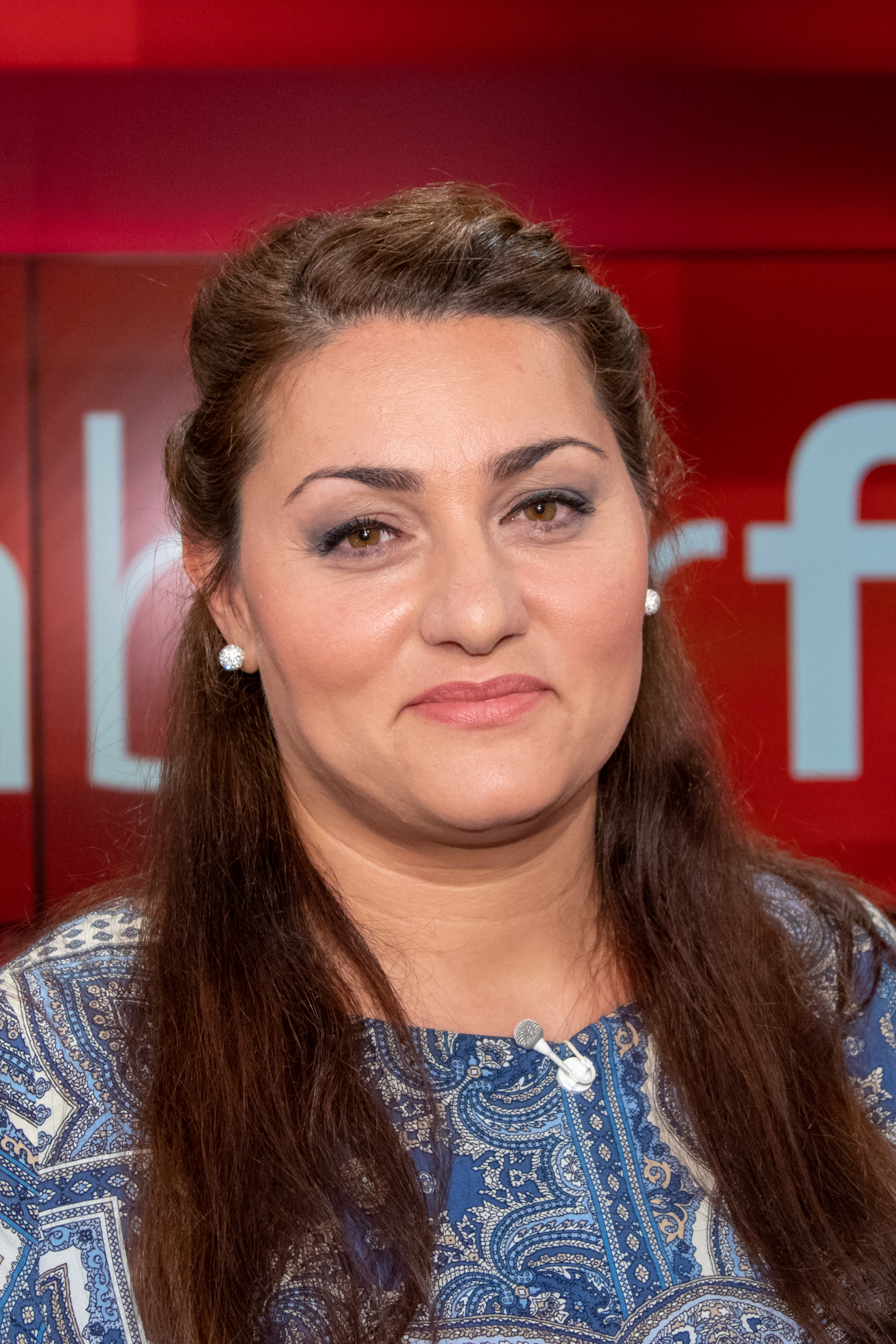
Lamya Kaddor, member of German parliament (Bundestag)

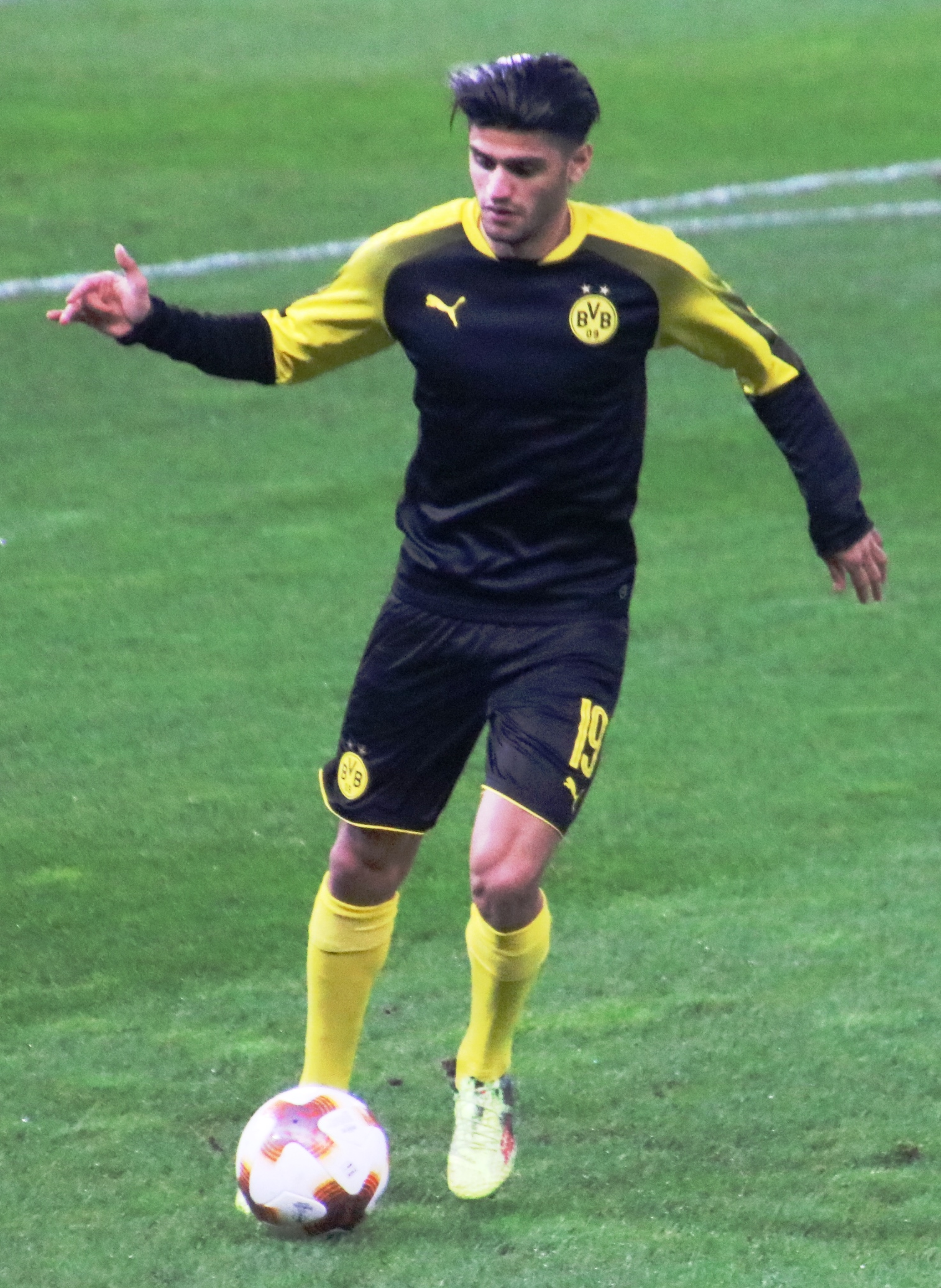
Mahmoud Dahoud, footballer

- Alaa Alhamwi, politician (Greens)
- Ijad Madisch, CEO and founder of ResearchGate
- Aias Aosman, footballer
- Mike Josef, Lord Mayor of Frankfurt
- Husam Chadat, actor and film director
- Mahmoud Charr, Boxer
- Mahmoud Dahoud, footballer
- Rasha Nasr, politician
- Mamoun Darkazanli
- Aziz Dyab, actor
- Rafed El-Masri, swimmer
- Hanin Elias, techno musician
- Lamya Kaddor, scholar of Islamic studies and member of German parliament
- Adel Karasholi, writer
- Yusra Mardini, swimmer
- Sarah Mardini, swimmer
- Rafik Schami, storyteller and writer
- Bassam Tibi, political scientist
- Rola El-Halabi, former multiple World Champion in women’s boxing

== Associations ==
=== Assyrians ===
Prior to the civil war, many of the Syrians who came to Germany were of Assyrian origin. During the conflict, Assyrians also sought protection from Islamist groups in Syria.

=== Kurds ===
A large proportion of the Syrians who have arrived in Germany are also of Kurdish origin, seeking protection from Islamist groups in Syria.

=== Turkmen ===
Established in Germany, the "Suriye Türkmen Kültür ve Yardımlaşma Derneği - Avrupa", or "STKYDA", ("Syrian Turkmen Culture and Solidarity Association - Europe") was the first Syrian Turkmen association to be launched in Europe. It was established in order to help the growing Syrian Turkmen community who arrived in the country since the outbreak of the Syrian Civil War. The association includes Syrian Turkmen youth activists from many different Syrian cities and who are now living across Western Europe.

== See also ==
- Immigration and crime in Germany
  - 2016 Ansbach bombing
  - 2016 Reutlingen knife attack
  - 2024 Solingen stabbings
- Syrian diaspora
  - Syrians in Austria
  - Syrians in Finland
  - Syrians in Sweden
  - Syrians in Norway
  - Syrians in Denmark
  - Syrians in Turkey
- Arabs in Germany
  - Arabs in Berlin
- Arab diaspora
  - Arabs in Europe
