= Block 13 =

Kuwaiti animated television series

- Genre: Comedy; Educational entertainment Slapstick; Musical; Children's
- Created by: Nawaf Salem Al-Shammari
- Written by: Nawaf Salem Al-Shammari; Mohammed Maseeb Najm
- Directed by: Nawaf Salem Al-Shammari
- Voices of: (See characters)
- Composer: Ammar Al-Binni
- Country of origin: Kuwait
- Original language: Kuwaiti Arabic
- No. of seasons: 3
- No. of episodes: 45

Production
- Running time: 5-23 minutes
- Production companies: Farooha Media Productions (season 3); Al Nazaer (seasons 1–3)

Original release
- Network: Kuwait Television
- Release: December 12, 2000 – December 5, 2002

Related
- South Park

Block 13 (Arabic: قطعة ١٣, romanized: qiteat ṯālatha 'ash, stylised as 13 ق ط ع ة) is a Kuwaiti animated television series and unlicensed Arabic adaptation of the American animated sitcom South Park. It was created and directed by Nawaf Salem Al-Shammari and aired on Kuwait Television during the second half of Ramadan, December 12, 2000, running until December 5, 2002. It was the first animated TV series to be produced in Arab States of the Persian Gulf. It re-aired on Kuwait Television for 2020's Ramadan, and continues to be re-run each Ramadan.

The series follows Hammoud, Azzouz, Saloom, Honey, Abboud, and his little sister Farooha, who all often go on wacky and unordinary misadventures. Similar to South Park in the United States, the series dealt with many issues that concerned the Middle East population but in a way that could be less offensive and more family-friendly. Unlike South Park, which is adult-oriented, Block 13 was meant for a general audience.

== Characters ==
=== Main characters ===
- Abdullah "Abboud" Bu Abboud Al-Abboud (voiced by Nawaf Salem Al-Shammari) – The ringleader of the group who always likes to be the center of attention, and is constantly ridiculed for his obesity. He is bald and wears a white taqiyah – also known as "gahfiya" in Kuwaiti Arabic – which sometimes leads to his teachers calling him "gahfiya" or "gahfiya boy". Abboud is the show's version of Eric Cartman.
- Ahmad "Hammoud" Kashkh Al-Zain (voiced by Mohammed Maseeb Najm) – The "coolest" and the most well-mannered boy out of his group. Coming from an upper-class family, he is often shown to be a teacher's pet by his classmates, and constantly relays advice from his father. He is the show's version of Stan Marsh.
- Abdulaziz "Azzouz" Mutlaq Bu Taqqah (also voiced by Mohammed Maseeb Najm) – The third member of the group. A Syrian-Kuwaiti boy who has a "yes man" personality, constantly in agreement with anything the boys say or do. In the first season, he wore a black and brown ushanka, but in Seasons 2 and 3, he wore a baseball cap with an A on it with the same colors. He has short, curly hair in the first season, and straight hair in the second season and beyond. He is the show's version of Kyle Broflovski.
- Saloom (also voiced by Nawaf Salem Al-Shammari) – The fourth member of the group. A timid, reserved, and innocent boy who is shown to be very emotionally sensitive, usually when anyone makes comments about his personal life as a poverty-stricken child. He wears his father's red keffiyeh that covers his face & muffles his speech. A running gag is his constant fatal and comically absurd accidents. He is the show's version of Kenny McCormick.
- Honey Hatif Atlan (voiced by Hani Sulaiman) – The fifth and newest member of the group. An American-Kuwaiti kid who moved to Block 13 to live with his grandmother, first appearing in the second season. He is aloof and constantly code-switches between English and Arabic, his main catchphrase being "Whatever." He is considered by many to be the show's version of Craig Tucker or Butters Stotch.

=== Secondary characters ===
- Farooha (voiced by Farah Nawaf Al-Shammari (credited as herself) who is the daughter of the director of block 13) – Abboud's baby sister who often accompanies the main four on their adventures. Her catchphrase is "Dig-iday!" (alternatively "Diged-dee"). She is considered to be the show's version of Ike Broflovski.
- Halool (voiced by Bu Hilal) – The frenemy (now friend) of the main four in earlier seasons. He is the Bedouin bully classmate, shown to be condescending, arrogant, and constantly butting heads with the main group.
- Jamool (voiced by Jamal Al-Shatti) – Halool's former sidekick in the first season. Another obese boy shown to be wisecracking at the main four's expense alongside Halool. After the first season, he is transformed into a penguin. Jalool is the show’s version of Butters Stotch.
- Jameah (voiced by Ali Al-Alawi) – Halool's newest sidekick and the replacement of Halool's former friend, Jamool. His name is mistaken with Friday, which commonly makes him mad. He has squiggly hair with an overbite. He is Omani, and constantly questions Halool's Bedouin Arabic slang.

=== Teachers ===
- Miss Attiyat (voiced by Nizar Al-Qandi) – The portly Egyptian female therapist-turned-teacher of the Block 13 public school. She has a tendency to mispronounce Kuwaiti words and wears a bright orange and yellow abaya. A running gag are cow jokes made at her expense due to her abaya, she is considered the show's equivalent to Mr. Mackey.
- Mr. Saleh (voiced by Saleh Al-Bawi) - A former teacher at the Block 13 school with severe anger issues, and was the main four's teacher before getting sent to a mental hospital over his relationship with Miss Attiyat at the end of the first season. He occasionally returns throughout the series as an antagonist. He is the show's version of Herbert Garrison.
- Mr. Atiya (voiced by Daoud Hussein) - A teacher who first appears in season 2 and replaces Mr. Saleh. He is shown to have a strong personality, and not as angry as Mr. Saleh, yet constantly roasts Abboud with fat jokes. He was also the love interest of Miss Attiyat.

== History ==
=== South Park ban ===
After South Park was banned in Kuwait due to offensive jokes targeted towards Islam, Block 13 was created to serve as a replacement for South Park in the region. The show reruns during Ramadan every year.

=== Series finale ===
Every episode of Block 13 is complete and documented on YouTube, except for the series finale, which is mostly lost. According to a YouTube video posted on March 7, 2009, uploaded by the director of Block 13, this episode was not centered around any particular thing, but included many different events.

== Spin-offs ==
=== Qatouta and Kaloob ===
Due to the show's success, after the show ended, a spin-off titled Qatouta and Kaloob (Arabic: قطوطة وكلوب, romanized: qatutat wakulub) was released during the Ramadan of 2003 and aired on Kuwait TV, made by the same people who worked on Block 13, and directed by Nawaf Salem Al-Shammari. The show stars Qatouta, a female purple cat along with Kaloob, Honey's pet dog. Qatouta is voiced by the same voice actor as Farooha from Block 13. Some Block 13 characters made some appearances in this spin-off such as Abboud, Saloom, and Miss Attiyat. Although a second season was planned to air on Alrai TV, it was cancelled due to financial reasons.

=== 13th Street ===
13th Street's thumbnail in Awaan. Take into consideration the logo and the character on the television, which are derived from Block 13.

A reboot known as 13th Street (Arabic: شارع 13) was released in 2022; it currently airs on VO, Dubai TV and Awaan. There is limited information available on this particular reboot. The basis for identifying it as a reboot is primarily attributed to the involvement of a significant number of individuals who previously contributed to Block 13, in addition to the shared nomenclature and milieu between the two productions.

== Home Media ==
In 2001, a cassette tape featuring music used in the show was released through the Block 13 official website. The tape features songs made for the show, as well as songs from other shows used for the show.
