= Cyprus–Syria relations =

Bilateral relations

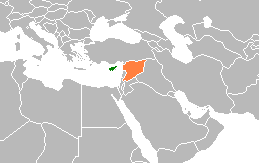
- Cyprus: Syria

Cyprus–Syria relations have roots that extend back centuries, with historical trade routes connecting the island of Cyprus to the Levant mainland. Formal diplomatic relations between Cyprus and Syria were established in 1962.

Cyprus and Syria share historical ties due to their geographical proximity in the Eastern Mediterranean region. In recent years, the conflict in Syria has strained relations to some extent.

== Historical background ==
The relations between Cyprus and Syria have roots that extend back centuries, with historical trade routes connecting the island of Cyprus to the Levant mainland. Both nations have experienced periods of external influence, such as the Ottoman Empire's rule over both territories, which fostered shared cultural and economic exchanges.

== Diplomatic relations ==
Formal diplomatic relations between Cyprus and Syria were established on 1 February 1962 when Cyprus accepted Thabit al-Aris, as Syrian Ambassador to Cyprus.

Following the closure of its embassy in Damascus, Cyprus has delegated its diplomatic and consular responsibilities concerning Syria to its embassy in Beirut, which now oversees these affairs. While Syria has an embassy in Nicosia.

The bilateral relationship has been shaped by various political and regional developments. Cyprus has been a member of the European Union since 2004, and this alignment has influenced its interactions with Syria, particularly in relation to EU-Syria relations. Despite this, Cyprus has continued to engage with Syria on various diplomatic fronts, including efforts to support peace in the Middle East.

In recent years, the conflict in Syria has strained relations to some extent. However, Cyprus has participated in international discussions related to the Syrian Civil War, advocating for peaceful resolutions and providing humanitarian aid through European and UN-led initiatives.

In 1997, Cypriot Foreign Minister Ioannis Kasoulides went for a three-day official visit to Syria, at the invitation of his Syrian counterpart Farouk al-Sharaa.In 2010, Cypriot Foreign Minister Markos Kyprianou visited Damascus, emphasizing continued cooperation in economic and cultural matters. In 2010, Syrian President Bashar al-Assad held talks with Cypriot President Demetris Christofias at the Presidential Palace in Nicosia.

== Economic relations ==
Economic interactions between Cyprus and Syria have included trade in goods such as agricultural products, textiles, and manufactured goods. The ports of Limassol and Larnaca in Cyprus and the ports of Latakia and Tartus in Syria have facilitated maritime trade for many years in the past during times of direct relations.

However, the economic impact of the Syrian Civil War has significantly reduced bilateral trade since 2011. Prior to the conflict, Syria was an important trading partner for Cyprus, particularly in the areas of tourism and transportation.

== Contemporary issues ==
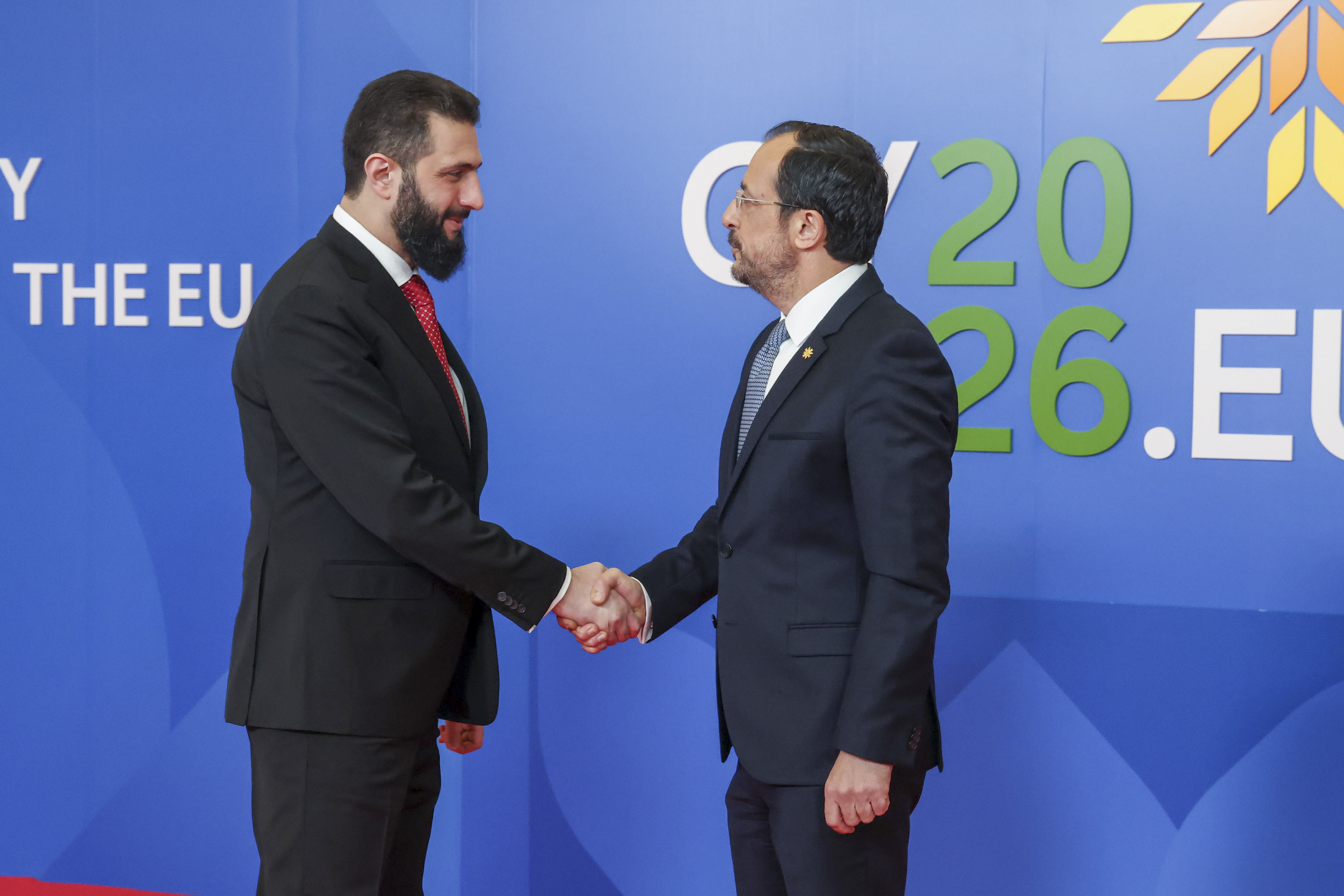
Cypriot President Nikos Christodoulides and Syrian President Ahmed al-Sharaa, 24 April 2026

The ongoing Syrian Civil War has had a considerable impact on Cyprus–Syria relations. Cyprus has played a role in international efforts to provide humanitarian assistance to Syrian refugees and has served as a transit point for aid to Syria due to its geographic proximity.

Moreover, Cyprus has cooperated with the European Union and the United Nations in addressing the refugee crisis, providing shelter and assistance to Syrian nationals fleeing the conflict. Cyprus has also participated in diplomatic discussions concerning the future of Syria and the stabilization of the region.

In recent years, Cyprus has adopted measures aimed at reducing the flow of refugees into the country, some of which have been criticized as stringent. As part of this approach, Cyprus has also sought to engage with the Assad regime, a policy that contrasts with the stance of the European Union, which has largely opposed normalization with the Syrian government.

As a response to the fall of the Assad regime, Cypriot President Nikos Christodoulides called for a peaceful democratic transition in Syria. He added that Syria's unity, territorial integrity, and sovereignty must be upheld, and a peaceful, inclusive, and Syrian-led political transition is demanded according to UN Security Council Resolution 2254. On 20 February 2025, Syrian President Ahmed al-Sharaa met with Cypriot Minister of Foreign Affairs Constantinos Kombos in Damascus.

== See also ==
- Foreign relations of Cyprus
- Foreign relations of Syria
