= Syrians in Sweden =

Swedish minority group

Syrians in Sweden Syrier i Sverige السوريون في السويد
Total population
- 196,152 (born in Syria); 66,698 (at least one Syrian-born parent); 250 000+ (2021 estimation)

Regions with significant populations
- Stockholm, Gothenburg, Malmö, Helsingborg, Landskrona, Örebro

Languages
- Arabic, Armenian, Kurdish, Swedish, Neo-Aramaic (Suret, Turoyo), Turkish

Religion
- Predominantly Sunni Islam, minorities of Shia Islam (Isma'ilism, Nusayris), Christianity (Syriac Christianity, Eastern Catholic Churches) and Mandaeans

Related ethnic groups
- Arabs in Sweden, Kurds in Sweden, Iraqis in Sweden, Assyrians in Sweden

Syrians in Sweden are citizens and residents of Sweden who are originally from the country of Syria or are from a family of Syrian descent. As of 2025, there were 197,201 residents of Sweden born in Syria, and 66,698 born in Sweden with at least one Syrian-born parent. After Germany, Sweden hosts the second-largest number of Syrian refugees in any European country outside of the Middle East. Many ethnic and religious groups, including Kurds, Assyrians, Sunni Muslim Syrians, and Palestinians, are part of the number of refugees entering Sweden from Syria.

== History ==
Even before the outbreak of the Syrian civil war in 2011, Sweden had a significant population of Syrian migrants, with religious and ethnic minorities such as Assyrians over-represented.

Many of the most recent arrivals of Syrians in Sweden began with the Syrian civil war in 2011, when thousands of Syrian citizens fled across the border into neighboring Turkey and Lebanon as a result of bombings, ethnic persecution and religious persecution.

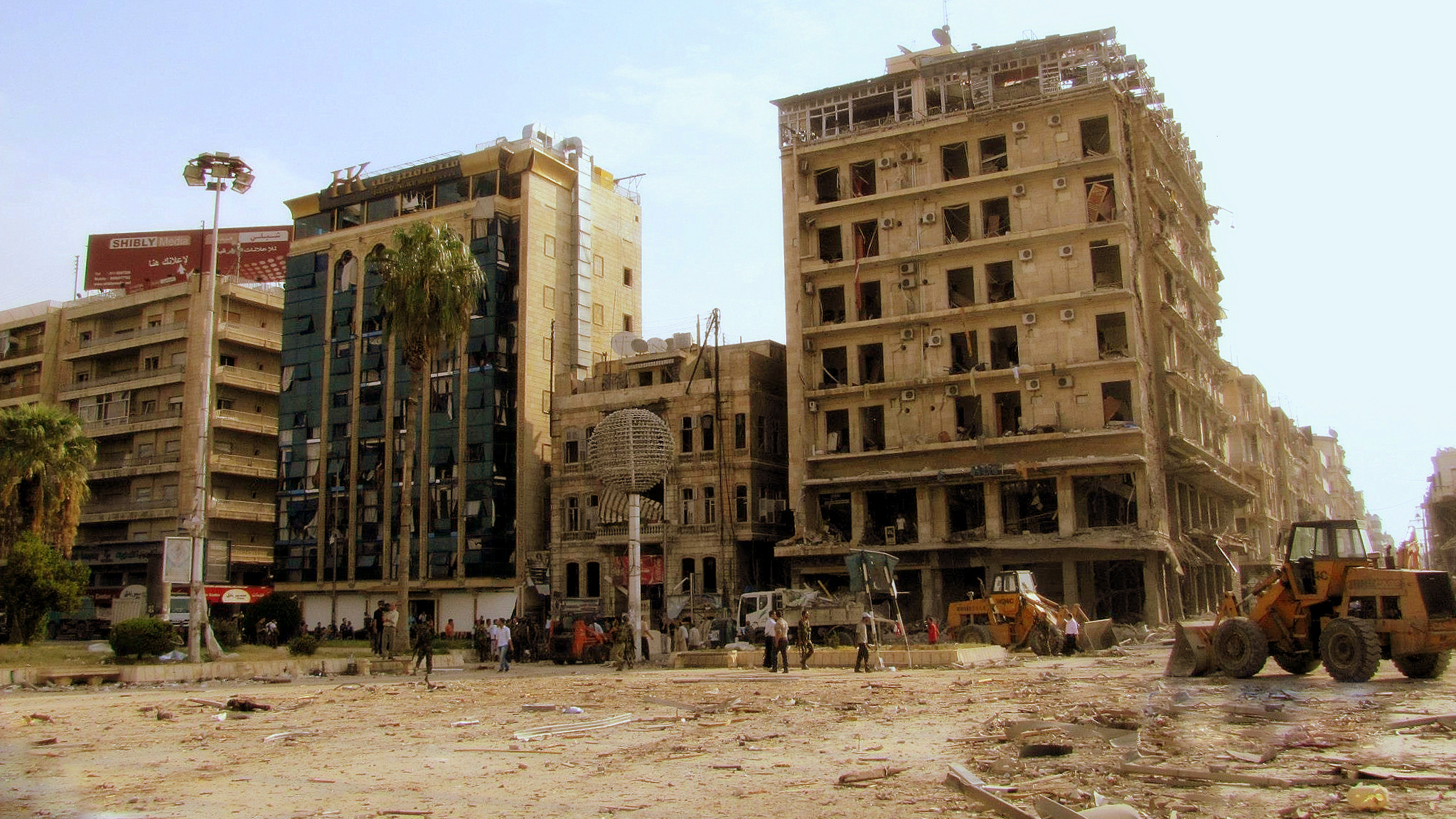
Living conditions in Syria were described as inhumane by the UN and human rights organizations, and was one of the reasons people chose to flee to, among other places, Sweden.

Of those who immigrated from Syria, the vast majority or 78% had arrived in the years 2014–2018. As the number of Syrian refugees began to rise, the country began to offer them automatic residence, which notably caused struggles as part of the larger Syrian refugee crisis such as chaotic housing. According to Statistiska centralbyrån, there were a total of 242,150 people in Sweden in 2019 who were born in Syria or have at least one parent who was.

In 2017, Syrian-born residents replaced ethnic Finns as the largest group of foreign-born peoples in the country. A study from 2021 calculated hypothetical population data of the country if the Syrian civil war had never occurred, showing that Sweden's population and Syrian community would be significantly smaller in a no-war scenario.

Syrian refugees entering Sweden has prompted concerns of foreign policy, with the Swedish government tightening restrictions on asylum in recent years. After the fall of the Assad regime in 2024, it was reported that hundreds of Syrians in the country had begun making trips back to the country, despite warnings of revocation of Swedish residence permits and advisory warnings. Many Syrians expressed mixed reactions following the events, gauging whether or not it was the right time for many Syrians to return to the country or stay following support in resettlement. Sweden was one of many European countries to suspend asylum requests following the fall of Assad, alongside Germany and other Scandinavian countries, citing a lack of analysis on the security situation.

== Demographics ==
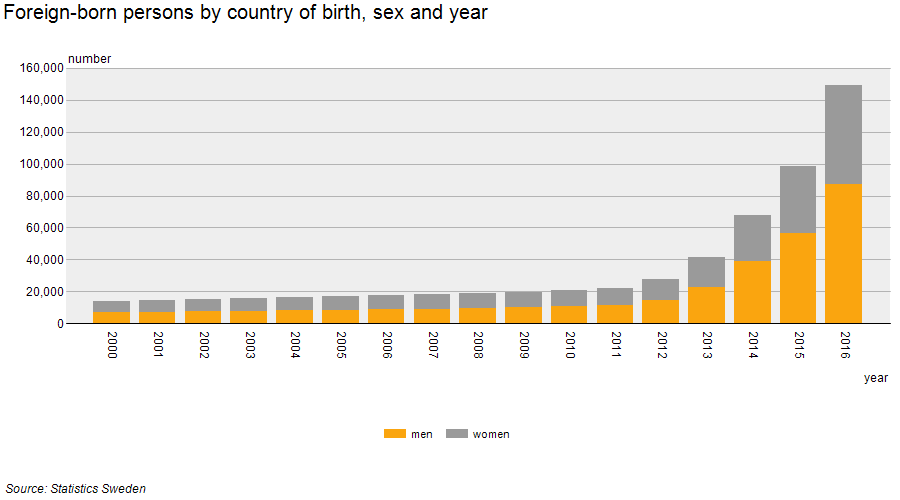
Syria-born persons in Sweden by sex, 2000-2016 (Statistics Sweden).

Most Syrians residing in Sweden arrived as asylum seekers following the Syrian Civil War, which began in 2011. According to Statistics Sweden, as of 2024, there were 196,152 citizens of Syria (108,154 men, 87,998 women) residing in Sweden. In 2016, there were an estimated 18,000 of the latter immigrants living in Södertälje. In 2016, 5,459 Syrian citizens (2,803 men, 2,656 women) residing in Sweden are registered as asylum seekers; however, this has drastically decreased in recent years, with only 976 Syrian citizens (562 men, 414 women) registered. In 2016, there were 39 registered emigrations from Sweden to Syria.

Official Swedish statistics show a stark increase in the number of Syrian-born citizens since 1960, when the population was only 6 people.

Historical population

Year	Pop.	±%
1960	6	—
1970	100	+1566.7%
1980	1,606	+1506.0%
1990	5,874	+265.8%
2000	14,162	+141.1%
2001	14,646	+3.4%
2002	15,156	+3.5%
2003	15,692	+3.5%
2004	16,168	+3.0%
2005	16,772	+3.7%

Year	Pop.	±%
2006	17,768	+5.9%
2007	18,229	+2.6%
2008	18,786	+3.1%
2009	19,646	+4.6%
2010	20,758	+5.7%
2011	22,357	+7.7%
2012	27,510	+23.0%
2013	41,748	+51.8%
2014	67,671	+62.1%
2015	98,216	+45.1%

Year	Pop.	±%
2016	149,418	+52.1%
2017	172,258	+15.3%
2018	185,991	+8.0%
2019	191,530	+3.0%
2020	193,594	+1.1%
2021	196,077	+1.3%
2022	197,799	+0.9%
2023	197,201	−0.3%
2024	196,152	−0.5%

== Education ==
In 2010, there were 18,292 students with Arabic as their mother tongue who participated in the state-run Swedish for Immigrants adult language program. Of these pupils, 3,884 had 0–6 years of education in their home country (Antal utbildningsår i hemlandet), 3,383 had 7–9 years of education in their home country, and 11,025 had 10 years education or more in their home country. As of 2012, 18,886 pupils with Arabic as their mother tongue, as well as 3,257 Syria-born students were enrolled in the language program.

According to a report from the Statistiska centralbyrån in 2014, 38% of residents born in Syria had pre-secondary education, 20% have secondary education, 20% have post-secondary education shorter than 3 years and 10% post-secondary education longer than 3 years.

As of 2016, according to Statistics Sweden, 35% of Syria-born individuals aged 25 to 64 have attained a primary and lower secondary education level (37% men, 34% women), 22% have attained an upper secondary education level (21% men, 23% women), 21% have attained a post-secondary education level of less than 3 years (21% men, 22% women), 15% have attained a post-secondary education of 3 years or more (16% men, 14% women), and 6% have attained an unknown education level (6% men, 7% women).

Syrian adolescents in the country face challenges in maintaining Syrian identity and culture while facing assimilation and adapting to Swedish society. Culture shock can be experienced by those who switch from speaking Arabic to Swedish in daily life. The crime rate remains relatively high among some young Syrians, engaging in gang related conflicts.

== Employment ==
According to Statistics Sweden, as of 2014, the employment rate is approximately 32% for Syrian-born immigrants.

According to the Institute of Labor Economics, as of 2014, Syrian-born individuals residing in Sweden have an employment population ratio of about 28%. They also have an unemployment rate of around 14%. Syrians in Sweden tend to accumulate large and persistent economic deficits, both public and private, due to reliance on social support; however, these deficits are negligible compared to the rest of the Swedish population.

== Notable people ==
- Elmar Abraham, football player
- Sargon Abraham, football player
- Khaled Alesmael, writer and journalist (Turkish mother and Syrian father)
- Hosam Aiesh, football player
- Ghayath Almadhoun, poet
- Simon Amin, football player (Assyrian parents from Syria)
- Roony Bardghji, football player
- Bishara (singer), singer
- Amir Chamdin, director and musician
- Louay Chanko, former football player and coach
- Rabi Elia, Assyrian football player
- Nassim Al Fakir, musician and TV personality
- Salem Al Fakir, musician, singer, songwriter and record producer
- Raby George, football player
- Charbel Georges, football player
- Silvana Imam, rapper (Syrian Father and Samogitian Mother)
- Mikael Ishak, football player (Assyrian parents from Syria)
- Oliver Kass Kawo, football player
- Osama Krayem, convicted terrorist, mass murderer and war criminal (Palestinian parents from Syria)
- Fadi Malke, football player
- Aiham Ousou, football player
- Fida al-Sayed, political activist and leader of Sweden's chapter of the Muslim Brotherhood
- Gabriel Somi, football player (Assyrian parents from Syria)
- Antonio Yakoub, Assyrian footballer
- Christer Youssef, Assyrian footballer

== See also ==
- Sweden–Syria relations
- Demographics of Syria
- Education in Sweden
- Education in Syria
- Islam in Sweden
- Syrian diaspora
- Syrians in Austria
- Syrians in Denmark
- Syrians in Finland
- Syrians in Germany
- Syrians in Norway
- Syrians in Turkey
