= Denmark–Syria relations =

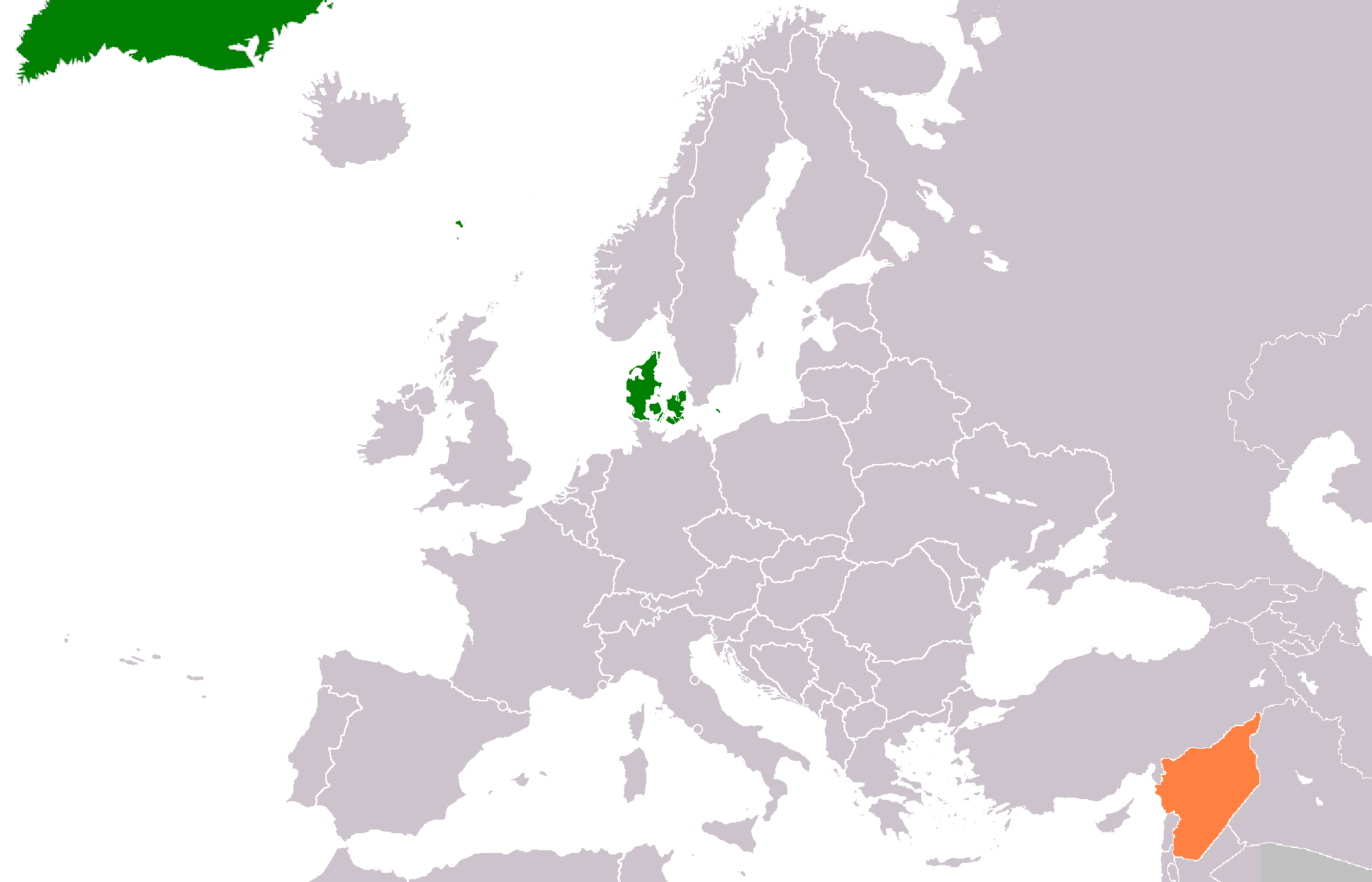
- Denmark: Syria

Denmark–Syria relations refers to the bilateral relations between Denmark and Syria. Both countries established diplomatic relations on August 29, 1992. Denmark is represented in Syria through its embassy in Damascus. Following the Jyllands-Posten Muhammad cartoons controversy and subsequent attack on the Danish embassy in 2006, relations between the two countries were greatly strained and later suspended.

== History of relations ==
=== Reaction to Jyllands-Posten Muhammad cartoons and violence against Danish Embassy ===
Following the publication of the Jyllands-Posten Muhammad cartoons, relations between the two countries were greatly strained. On 4 February 2006, the Danish and Norwegian Embassies in Damascus were torched by protestors. They waved portraits of Syrian President Bashar al-Assad, leather-bound copies of the Quran, and the flags of Hamas and the Lebanese militant group Hezbollah. Hundreds of protesters hurled stones at the Danish embassy before scaling it, amid chants of "God is great" before moving on to attack the Norwegian embassy. A bomb threat was also made against the Danish embassy although no bomb was found, the ties were later suspended.

=== Danish Government response ===
Danish Prime Minister Anders Fogh Rasmussen said that the governments of Iran and Syria had intentionally inflamed Muslim protests against a Danish newspaper's publication of cartoons depicting Muhammad to distract attention from their own diplomatic crises. He said "Syria and Iran have taken advantage of the situation because both countries are under international pressure," Rasmussen also said he would "not exclude the possibility" that Syria had also been involved in violent protests in Beirut, Lebanon referring to the fact that similar violence against the Danish Embassy in Beirut occurred the following day after the attacks in Damascus.

Foreign Minister Per Stig Moeller said that "Syria failed in its duty. It is completely unacceptable that the embassy was not protected by the Syrians". Stig Moeller said his government had also asked the European Union to condemn events in Damascus. Shortly after the attack, the Danish government told its nationals to leave Syria immediately. Danish diplomatic staff also left Syria and temporarily closed its embassy stating that staff "have provisionally left Syria because Syrian authorities reduced their protection to an unacceptably low level".

=== Syrian response ===
A day after the attacks, Syria's foreign ministry issued a statement expressing "its regret over the acts of violence which accompanied the protests." The Syrian Government denied any role in the attacks and blamed Denmark for the violence and an editorial in Syria's state-run daily newspaper said that "Denmark's government could have avoided reaching this point simply by issuing a sincere apology". Syrian Foreign Ministry condemned the cartoons as an offence to Muslims and Arabs and demanded the Danish government punish the offending paper.

Syria recalled its ambassador from Denmark. Danish goods including Lego and Bang & Olufsen were boycotted in Syria. Syria then suspended ties.

=== Response from others ===
The governments of the United States and Norway placed the blame for the rioting squarely on the Syrian government for failing to protect the embassies. The US Government said it was "inexcusable" for such damage to be inflicted on diplomatic missions. US President George W Bush condemned the violence against Danish embassies and spoke about this incident in a phone call to the Danish Prime Minister. Bush also said "I call upon the governments around the world to stop the violence, to be respectful, to protect property, protect the lives of innocent diplomats who are serving their countries overseas." Scott McClellan, the White House Press Secretary said “We hold Syria responsible for such violent demonstrations since they do not take place in that country without government knowledge and support,”

=== Ensuing relations ===
On the 27 February, Denmark's ambassador to Syria, Ole Egberg Mikkelsen, returned to Damascus, where he had a meeting with the Syrian Deputy Foreign Minister, Ahmad Arnous. They discussed how to enhance bilateral relations through dialogue and mutual understanding and Minister Arnous stressed Syria's keenness to continue relations with Denmark. The Syrian Government said it would compensate for the damages made in these incidents to embassies. However, by February 2007, it was reported Denmark had received no compensation from the Syrian Government for the damage.

In January 2007, Danish embassy staff including the ambassador evacuated the country following security concerns.

=== War in Syria and refugee support ===
During the Syrian civil war, over five thousand Syrians sought asylum in Denmark by 2016. In 2019, Denmark decided to halt renewing temporary protection status of 1,200 individuals, designating government-held areas such as Damascus, Rif Dimashq, Latakia, and Tartus Governorates as safe zones. Denmark has contributed €28 million to the Syria Recovery Trust Fund. Following the outcome of the Syrian civil war and government change, Denmark paussed processing applications for Syrian refugees and allowed those given a deadline to leave, to stay a while longer.

== Cultural relations ==
The Danish government has also a Danish Institute based in Bayt al-Aqqad in Damascus which opened in 2000.

== See also ==
- Foreign relations of Denmark
- Foreign relations of Syria
- Syrians in Denmark
- International reactions to the Jyllands-Posten Muhammad cartoons controversy
