= Netherlands–Syria relations =

Bilateral relations

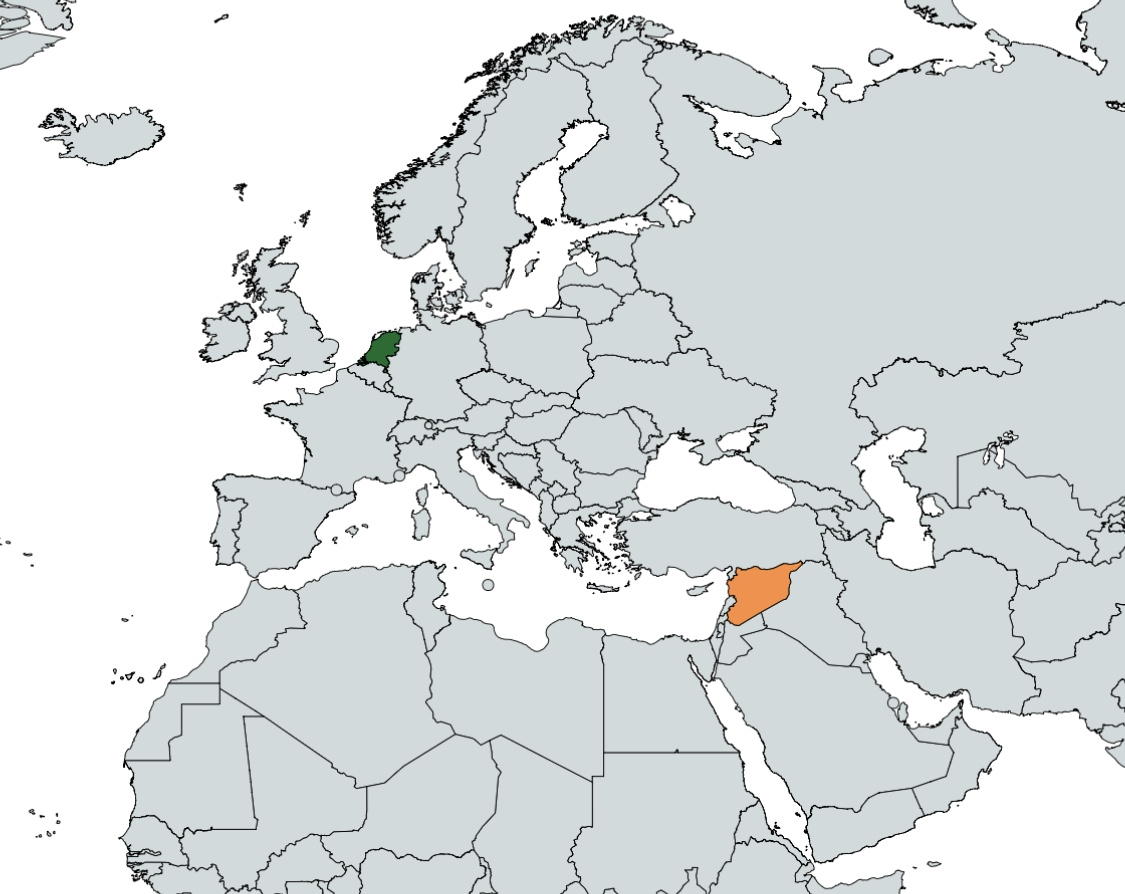
- Netherlands: Syria

Netherlands–Syria relations were first established on 24 January 1952 when Knoop Koopmans from the Netherlands was accredited in Syria.

Relations have fluctuated over the years, particularly influenced by political developments within Syria and international responses to the Syrian civil war. Relations between the two countries were suspended in 2012.

== History ==
The Netherlands and Syria formally established diplomatic relations in 1952. Early relations were marked by bilateral cooperation in trade, cultural exchanges, and diplomatic interactions. During the 20th century, diplomatic relations remained stable, though limited, due to Syria's regional alliances and the Netherlands' alignment with Western Europe and the United States.

== Diplomatic relations ==
The onset of the Syrian civil war in 2011 led to a dramatic shift in the Netherlands' approach to Syria. Following reports of human rights abuses and conflict escalation, the Netherlands joined the European Union in condemning the Syrian government and imposed economic sanctions. Diplomatic relations were effectively suspended in 2012 as the Netherlands closed its embassy in Damascus. Since then, Dutch efforts have focused on humanitarian assistance and support for Syrian refugees.

Syrian interests in the Netherlands are the responsibility of the Syrian Embassy in Brussels, Belgium.

=== Legal proceedings ===
In 2020, the Netherlands announced that it intended to hold Syria legally accountable for human rights abuses through the International Court of Justice. This unprecedented move marked one of the most direct confrontations between Syria and a European country on legal grounds regarding the Syrian government’s treatment of its citizens.

== Humanitarian assistance ==
The Netherlands has been a significant donor to humanitarian initiatives in response to the Syrian crisis. Since 2011, the Dutch government has allocated substantial funding toward supporting Syrian refugees in neighboring countries, particularly in Lebanon, Jordan, and Turkey. The Netherlands has also provided funds to various United Nations agencies and non-governmental organizations that operate in Syria to offer food, medical aid, and educational services.

== Syrian community in the Netherlands ==
The Syrian diaspora in the Netherlands has grown significantly, with thousands of Syrians seeking asylum due to the civil war. The Dutch government has implemented integration programs to support Syrian refugees in their adaptation to Dutch society, including language courses, job training, and educational support.

As of 2024, the situation for Syrians in the Netherlands has become more precarious following the government's announcement of plans to potentially declare certain regions in Syria as safe. This decision is part of a broader agreement among coalition parties to revise asylum policies, including reassessing temporary permits every three years and eliminating permanent residency for new refugees. Prime Minister Dick Schoof indicated that refugees from these safe areas would no longer be eligible for asylum. In response, hundreds of Syrians protested in The Hague, asserting that no part of Syria can be considered safe while the Assad regime remains in power. Protesters voiced concerns about the dangers of returning to Syria, citing the regime's history of arresting and torturing returnees.

== See also ==
- Foreign relations of the Netherlands
- Foreign relations of Syria
- Dutch involvement in the Syrian civil war
