= Syrians in Norway =

Total population
- 34,112 (2019 Official Norway estimate) 0.64% of the Norwegian population

Regions with significant populations
- Oslo, Bergen, Stavanger, Kristiansand,

Languages
- Arabic (Syrian Arabic), Kurdish, Turkish, Neo Aramaic, Norwegian

Religion
- Predominantly Islam (mostly Sunni and a minority of Shi'a); Minority Christianity (Syriac, Oriental Orthodox, Catholicism, Lutheranism), Atheism

Related ethnic groups
- Arabs, Syrian diaspora

Syrians in Norway are citizens and residents of Norway who are of Syrian descent. Most have arrived as asylum immigrants because of the Syrian civil war.

== Demographics ==
According to Statistics Norway, in 2017, there were a total 20,823 persons of Syrian origin living in Norway. Of those, 1,462 individuals were born in Norway to immigrant parents. In 2019 the number have risen to 34,112.

== Socioeconomics ==
According to Statistics Norway, as of 2012-2014, the percentage of Syria-born immigrants in Norway with a persistently low income averaged out at 52.8%. This was a higher proportion than the native population and many other immigrant groups, largely because most Syrian individuals arrived as asylum immigrants, who tend to have lower incomes. The percentage of Syria-born immigrants with a persistently low income has also steadily declined the longer that the individuals have resided in Norway, with proportions of 86.9% among 3 year Syria-born residents, 53.2% among 4-9 year residents, and 38.4% among residents of 10 years or longer. This was relative to immigrant averages of 26.3% overall, 50.3% among 3 year residents, 28.5% among 4-9 year residents, and 20.2% among residents of 10 years or more.

According to Statistics Norway, as of 2015, a total of 196 Syria citizens residing in Norway incurred sanctions. The principal breaches were traffic offences (72 individuals), followed by other offences for profit (48 individuals), public order and integrity violations (37 individuals), property theft (16 individuals), drug and alcohol offences (14 individuals), violence and maltreatment (6 individuals), other offences (2 individuals), sexual offences (1 individual), and criminal damage (0 individuals).

In 2018, Statistics Norway reported that of recently arrived migrants from Syria there was a high proportion (67%) with only basic education (Norwegian: Grunnskole).

== See also ==
- Immigration to Norway
- Islam in Norway
- Syrian diaspora
- Syrians in Denmark
- Syrians in Finland
- Syrians in Sweden
