= Syrians in Denmark =

Citizens and residents of Denmark of Syrian descent

Total population
- 40,477

Regions with significant populations
- Aarhus, Copenhagen, Odense, Vejle

Languages
- Arabic (Syrian Arabic), Kurdish, Turkish, Domari, Armenian, Neo Aramaic, Danish

Religion
- Predominantly Islam; minority Christianity (Syriac Christianity, Catholicism)

Related ethnic groups
- Other Arabs in Denmark, Syrian diaspora

Syrians in Denmark are citizens and residents of Denmark who are of Syrian descent.

== Demographics ==
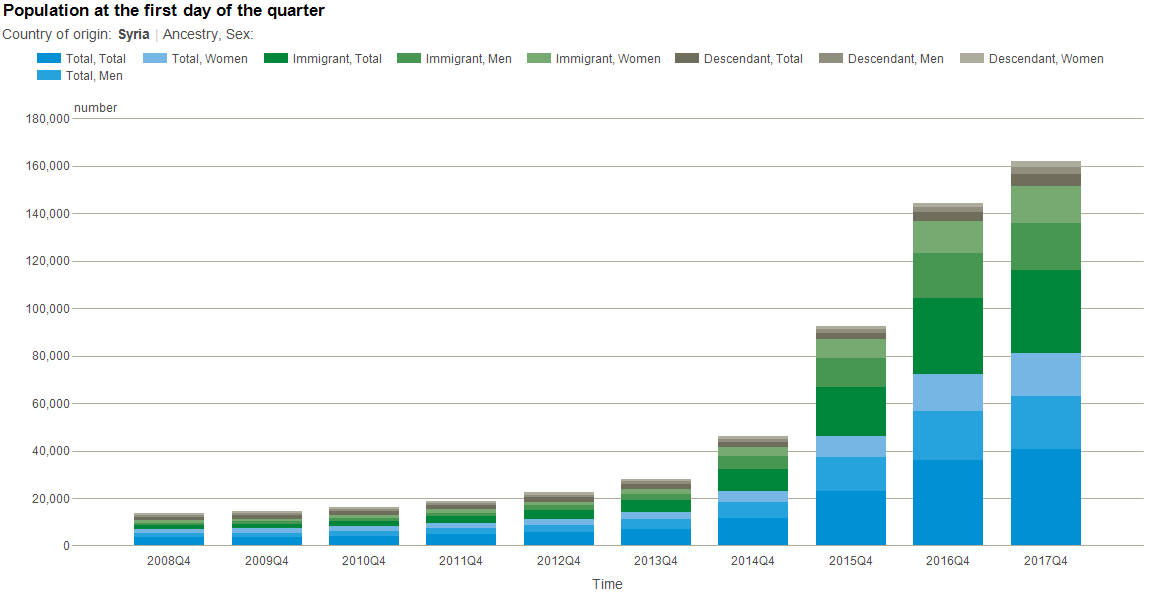
Population of Syrian origin in Denmark by sex, yearly fourth quarter 2008-2017 (Statistics Denmark).

Syrians in Denmark arrived primarily as asylum seekers after the Syrian civil war. According to Statistics Denmark, as of 2017, there are a total 40,477 persons of Syrian origin living in Denmark. Of those individuals, 35,262 are Syria-born immigrants and 5,215 are descendants of Syria-born persons. 33,283 individuals are citizens of Syria (18,726 men, 14,557 women).

As of 2016, a total of 2,955 Syria-born persons have been granted residence permits in Denmark for family reunification, 5,300 for asylum, 7 for study, 14 for work, 2 for EU/EEA residing family members, 4 for adoption, and 124 for other reasons. Syrian residents are generally young, with most belonging to the 5–9 years (5,371 individuals), 0–4 years (5,352 individuals), 30–34 years (4,294 individuals), 10–14 years (4,167 individuals), and 25–29 years (4,029 individuals) age groups.

== Socioeconomics ==
According to Statistics Denmark, as of 2016, among Syria-born adults aged 30–59 in Denmark, around 87% of men and 94% of women live full-time in public housing units. This is because many arrived via family reunification or as refugees, and such immigrants usually settle in government-owned properties. Syrians primarily inhabit the regions of Syddanmark (11,345), Midtjylland (10,837), Hovedstaden (7,349), Sjælland (6,901), and Nordjylland (4,045), and the cities of Aarhus (1,910), Copenhagen (1,471), Odense (1,161), and Vejle (1,068).

According to Statistics Denmark, as of 2016, male immigrants from Syria aged 20–59 have an annual income of just over 150,000 Danish krone before taxation. Most of that income comprises public transfers, with the remainder consisting of earned income, investment income and second income. As of 2017, a total of 17,451 persons of Syrian origin in Denmark received public benefits. Of these individuals, the government funds were primarily allocated toward guidance and activities upgrading skills (5,666 persons), social benefits (3,747 persons), net unemployment (2,820 persons), subsidized employment (2,575 persons), the Danish State Education Grant and Loan Scheme Authority (2,138 persons), disability pension (412), job-based sickness benefits (50 persons), maternity benefits (38 persons), persons receiving holiday benefits (3 persons), and early retirement pay (1 person).

=== Crime ===
According to Statistics Denmark, Syrian migrants and their descendants are over-represented as perpetrators of crime. Male Syrian descendants are about 15 times more likely to commit violent crime. As of 2016, Syria-born male immigrants in Denmark aged 15–79 have a total crime index of 97 when adjusted for age only, with an adjustment of 61 for age and socioeconomic status. Their male descendants have a total crime index of 300 when adjusted for age only, with adjustments of 293 for age and socioeconomic status, 241 for age and family education, and 239 for age and family income. With regard to type of infringement, the male descendants of Syria-born individuals have a penal code crime index of 475 when adjusted for age only (with adjustments of 400 for age and socioeconomic status, 304 age and family education, and 278 for age and family income), of which the crime index when adjusted for age only is 552 for violent offences (with adjustments of 465 for age and socioeconomic status, 343 age and family education, and 319 for age and family income) and 421 for property offences (with adjustments of 356 for age and socioeconomic status, 268 age and family education, and 240 for age and family income). The crime index when adjusted for age only is 302 for traffic law (with adjustments of 315 for age and socioeconomic status, 259 for age and family education, and 274 for age and family income) and 315 for special laws (with adjustments of 297 for age and socioeconomic status, 249 age and family education, and 241 for age and family income). The average crime index among the general Danish population is set at 100 and percentage points above or below that baseline reflect greater or lesser prevalence, depending on a population's most common age group and its relative socioeconomic status. As of 2016, a total of 1,033 persons of Syrian origin were found guilty of crimes. Of these individuals, 923 were males and 110 were females, with males between the ages of 15–29 years (465 individuals) and 30–49 years (407 individuals) constituting most of the total. The most common types of offences were violations of traffic law (602 individuals, of which 570 breached the Road Traffic Act), followed by violations of the penal code (269 individuals, of which 176 made offences against property) and special laws (238 individuals, of which 117 breached other special laws). Most of the persons received a fine (869 individuals), with the remainder given unsuspended imprisonment (75 individuals), suspended imprisonment (71 individuals), withdrawal of charges (8 individuals), no charges (5 individuals), other decisions (3 individuals), or preventive measures (2 individuals).

== Employment ==
According to Statistics Denmark, as of 2014, Syria-born immigrants aged 30–64 in Denmark have an employment rate of approximately 14%. Syria-born individuals aged 16–64 also have a self-employment rate of around 14%.

According to the Institute of Labor Economics, as of 2014, Syria-born residents in Denmark have an employment population ratio of about 28%. They also have an unemployment rate of roughly 13%.

== Notable people ==
- Feras Agwa, Rapper of mixed Egyptian-Syrian parents
- Naser Khader, politician of Syrian-Palestinian origin
- Sherin Khankan, imam of mixed Finnish-Syrian parents
- Maryam al-Khawaja, Muslim of Syrian origin

== See also ==
- Arabs in Denmark
- Iraqis in Denmark
- Kurds in Denmark
- Turks in Denmark
- Lebanese people in Denmark
- Immigration to Denmark
- Denmark–Syria relations
- Syrian diaspora
- Syrians in Finland
- Syrians in Norway
- Syrians in Sweden
- Islam in Denmark
