= Spain–Syria relations =

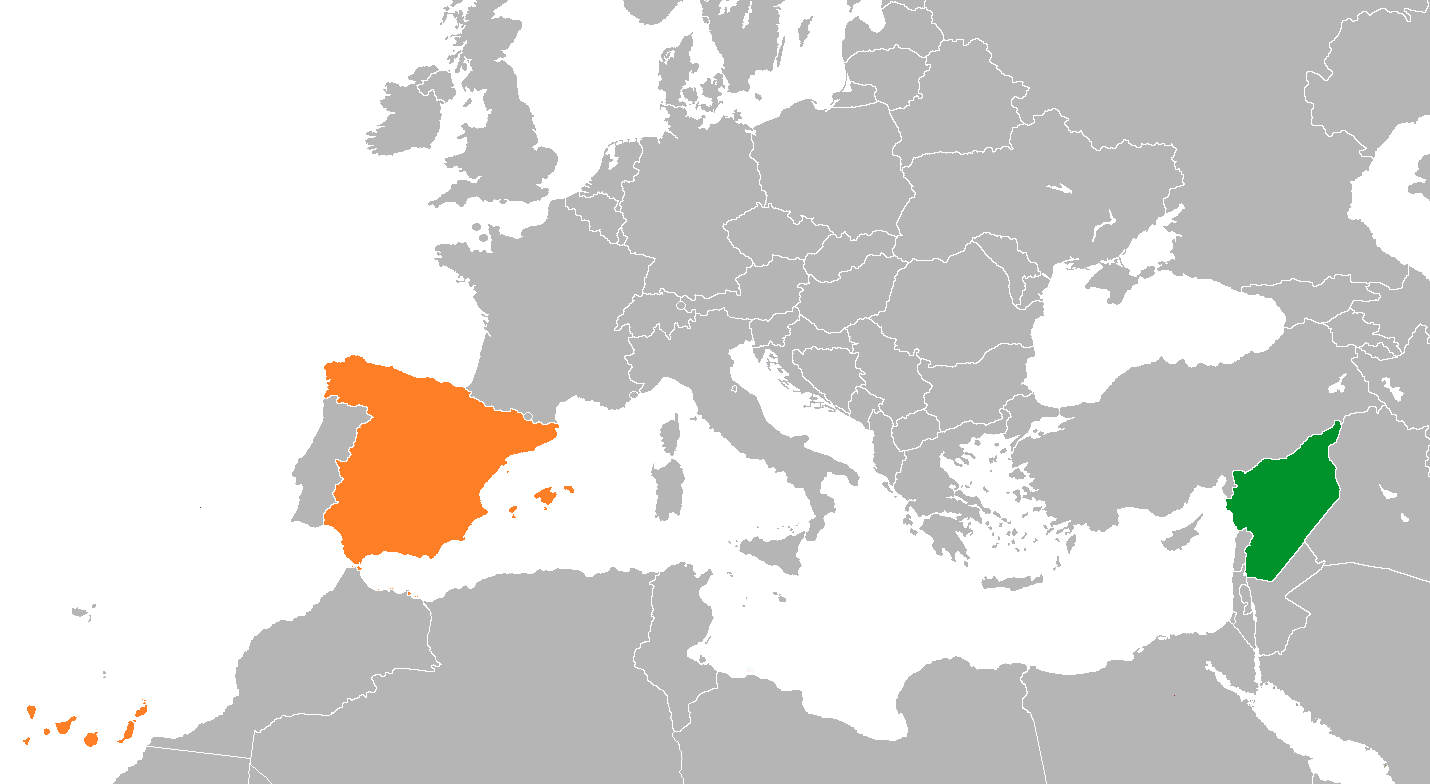
- Spain: Syria

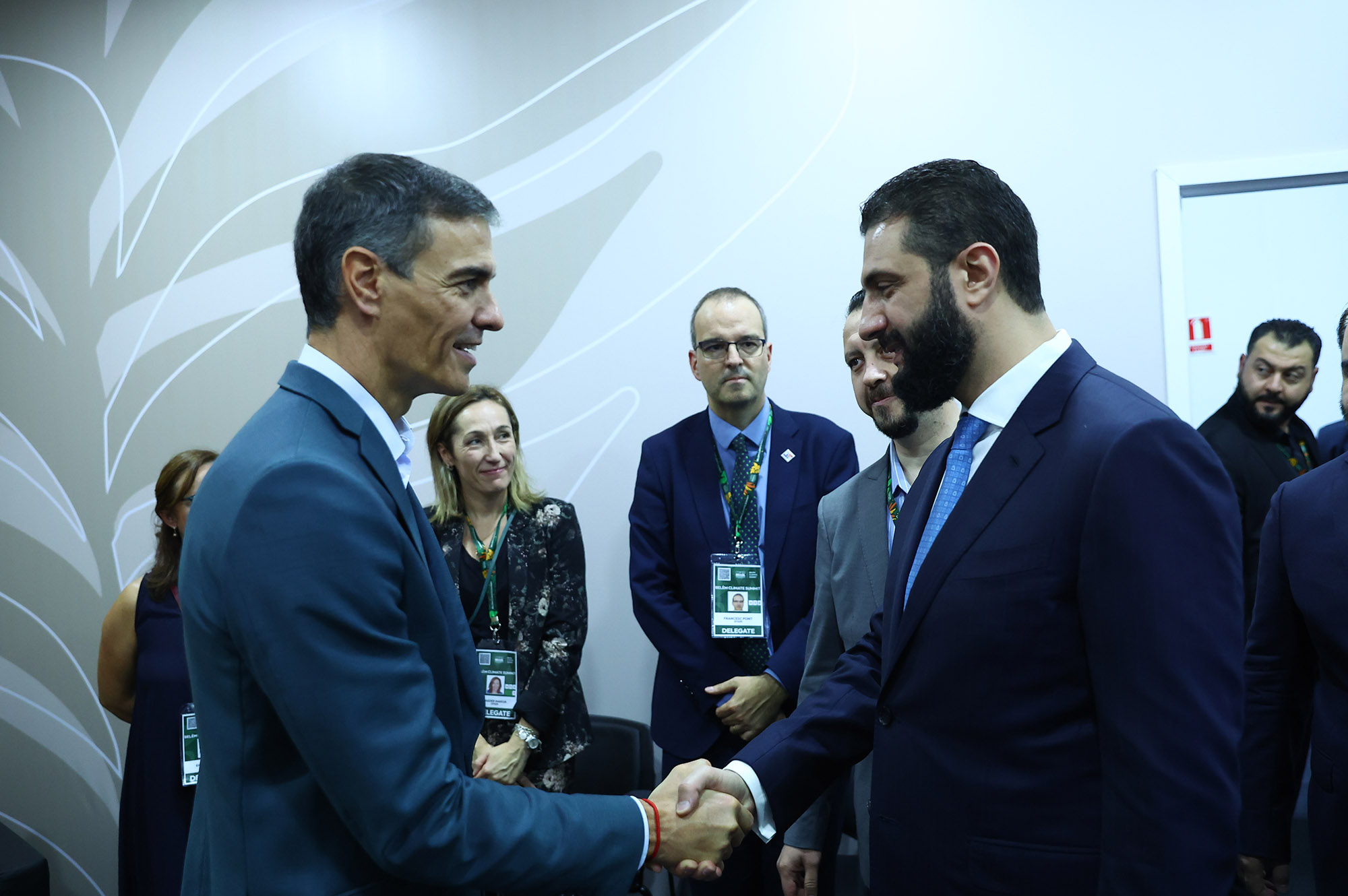
Spanish Prime Minister Pedro Sánchez (left) and Syrian President Ahmed al-Sharaa, November 7, 2025

Spain–Syria relations are the bilateral and diplomatic relations between the Kingdom of Spain and the Syrian Arab Republic. Siria has an embassy in Madrid. Spain has an embassy in Damascus. Both countries are charter members of the Union for the Mediterranean, although Syria suspended its membership in 2011.

== History of relations ==
=== Francoist Spain and Arab Syria (1948–1975) ===
Francoist Spain established diplomatic relations with the First Syrian Republic on April 3, 1948. The Syrian embassy in Madrid was opened in 1950 and relations between the Syrian leader Adib Shishakli and Francisco Franco were very positive. Franco's regime, cornered by the international community, emphasized revitalizing the Mediterranean pillar of its foreign policy, staging a rapprochement with the Arab powers at the height of Pan-Arabism. In 1952, Spain signed a friendship treaty with Syria in what would become the beginning of a solid link.

When Syria was already firmly dominated by the President Hafez al-Assad in 1970, a considerable number of highly educated young Syrians emigrated to Spain. Spain also welcomed Syrian political refugees including Rifaat al-Assad, accused of attempting a coup in 1983.

=== Syrian civil war ===
Since the beginning of the protests in Syria, the hitherto excellent Hispanic-Syrian relations have suffered a notable deterioration as a result of the brutal repression exerted by the regime in the face of citizen protests that have taken place since the end of March 2011.

The Spanish position regarding Syria is part of the EU's reaction to these events, which include the imposition of various types of sanctions on the government and its leaders.

On February 7, 2012, Spain called its Ambassador in Damascus to consultations, which as of the date of writing of this text has not yet returned. On March 6, the Spanish Minister of Foreign Affairs and Cooperation announced the suspension of the activities of the Spanish Embassy in Damascus.

On May 30, 2012, Spain declared persona non-grata to the Syrian Ambassador in Madrid and to several other Syrian diplomats. Syria, on the other hand, declared non grata people on June 6, 2012, to the Ambassador of Spain in Damascus (who was already in Madrid) and the senior diplomat, of the two who remained in Damascus.

Currently, a single Spanish diplomat remains accredited as Chargé d'Affaires ad interim in Syria, although in 2013 he was forced to leave Damascus and move temporarily to Beirut due to the situation of insecurity inside Syria.

However, when the security situation permits, it makes short trips to the country to meet the needs of Spanish citizens who have decided not to leave the country (despite the numerous warnings issued by the Embassy for more than two years) and check the status of state buildings and properties in the Syrian capital.

Following the collapse of the regime of Bashar al-Assad in December 2024, the independence flag of Syria was hoisted in the embassy in Madrid.

In January 2025, de facto Syrian leader Ahmed al-Sharaa met with Spanish foreign minister José Manuel Albares in Damascus. The latter expressed Spanish support for the gradual lifting of sanctions on Syria. Albares also took part in the re-opening of the Spanish embassy in Damascus, closed in 2012. Albares committed €6 million in humanitarian aid to Syria and pledged another €1.6 million to Syria through the Grain From Ukraine program.

== Economic relations ==
The economic relations between Spain and Syria have been discreet. This general panorama has its exceptions in the interest shown by some companies in the Spanish energy sector to participate in international competitions for large infrastructure projects.

The main obstacle to the presence of Spanish companies in Syria is, traditionally, the impenetrable bureaucratic network. Despite this, at the end of the year 2010 both Gamesa (wind farm construction), SOCOIN supervision of the construction of a combined cycle plant, as well as MAKIBER (Al-Assad hospital expansion) won tenders. However, some of these projects such as GAMESA and SOCOIN have been abandoned due to the lack of security in the country since mid-2011.

== Cooperation ==
Until May 2011 the AECID programs were coordinated with those developed by the European Commission and with the XI Five-Year Plan −2011 / 2015– adopted by the Syrian authorities.

Likewise, actions are coordinated with WHO and UNDP, although, until the stoppage of activities, Spanish cooperation was focusing its efforts on strengthening bilateral mechanisms to the detriment of multilateral aid.

In May 2011, and due to the Syrian regime's response to the revolts that began in March of that year, bilateral cooperation programs were frozen in line with the decision taken by the EU in the same direction.

Since then, only programs developed with civil society and multilateral organizations have been implemented. The stoppage of activities affects both the programs supporting the national nursing plan and the support for the decentralization process in the Northeast region.

During 2011, the 3 agreements signed by AECID and three Spanish NGOs (Foundation for the Social Promotion of Culture, Rescue and Action Against Hunger) in education, the disabled, gender and agriculture, although in some cases the activities have been developed more slowly than expected due to the situation in the country. The II Phase of the improvement project in hospital waste management coordinated by the NGO AIDA has not been able to be executed since April 2011.

The only grants disbursed in 2011 correspond to proposals from the Foundation for the Social Promotion of Culture (FPSC) and Rescue to work with displaced Iraqi and Palestinian refugees in Syria. Spanish NGOs with a presence in the country in 2011 (FPSC, Rescue, Action Against Hunger and AIDA) have withdrawn their expatriate cooperating staff from the country. The total aid through NGOs has amounted to about 300,000 Euros.

In February 2012, the Office of Humanitarian Action of AECID made a contribution of 300,000 euros to the International Committee of the Red Cross to support actions aimed at assisting the Syrian population affected by the events in the country.

During 2013, Spain committed an important amount of aid to alleviate the situation of refugees in the different bordering countries through the UN agencies and the International Committee of the Red Cross. This same commitment is maintained for 2014 in which €5.5 million will be provided for this same purpose in the first six months of the year.

== See also ==
- Foreign relations of Spain
- Foreign relations of Syria
- List of ambassadors of Spain to Syria
