= Syria Recovery Trust Fund =

The Syria Recovery Trust Fund (SRTF) is a multidonor trust fund established in 2013, to channel grant financing toward rebuilding essential infrastructure and public services in Syria. It primarily supports water, health, electricity, education, food security, solid waste removal, as well as other sectors including rule of law, agriculture, transportation, telecommunication, public enterprise, and housing.

The current director of SRTF is eng. Hani Khabbaz, and has been since June 2014. Khabbaz operates the Management Unit (MU), which is primarily responsible for the daily management and operation of the SRTF, in coordination with the Chief Coordination Officer.

== History ==
The SRTF was created in September 2013 under a framework agreement signed by The United States of America , Germany, United Arab Emirates, with German development bank KfW acting as trustee and administrator. The initial contributions from Germany and the UAE were each €10 million, and KfW was tasked with structuring and managing the fund on behalf of the donor community. Over subsequent years, additional donor states, including Denmark, Finland, France, the United Kingdom, Italy, Japan, Kuwait, the Netherlands, and Sweden joined the Fund.

In June of 2014 Turkey joined the SRTF as a permanent member and became part of the governance structure since it is the host country to the Fund’s operational management. Jordan joined in November 2015 as part of the SRTF governance structure in its important function as a second host country to the Fund’s operational management.

== Scope of work ==
According to donor documents and development agency sources, the SRTF seeks to restore basic public services, rebuild infrastructure, and support resilience and livelihood recovery in war-affected communities. Its interventions cover sectors such as water and sanitation, health, electricity and energy (including solar power), agriculture, waste management, and small business support.

== Governance and financing ==
KfW acts as trustee and financial manager of the SRTF, handling donor contributions and disbursements. The Fund’s governance includes oversight by donor states and a management committee or board (though precise public documentation of its governance structure is limited). Funding totals and performance are periodically published by KfW and SRTF. As of a 2024 KfW update, cumulative commitments by donor states to projects via KfW (including SRTF) amounted to about €373.9 million, with the SRTF said to have reached 14 million people. KfW further asserts that in late 2024 Germany contributed €10 million and the Netherlands €2 million to the SRTF.

=== Management committee ===
The Management Committee (MC) is responsible for directing, monitoring, evaluating, assessing SRTF operations and procurement process, as well as approving proposed projects. It consists of original donor representatives, Republic of Türkiye, the Hashemite Kingdom of Jordan as representatives and the Management Unit (MU) as observer. There are four additional members rotated between the acceding donors. The MC is chaired by the Trustee, KfW.

=== Steering Board ===
The Steering Board (SB) is responsible for SRTF strategies, general policies and overall supervision for the SRTF. The SB consists of Donor Members, the Republic of Türkiye and the Hashemite Kingdom of Jordan. The Trustee (KfW) and the Management Unit (MU) serve in an Ex-Officio capacity. The Steering Board meets every six months to monitor, assess, and endorse the priorities of the Fund and to provide strategic direction."

== Key projects and activities ==
Agriculture

In cooperation with the United Nations Development Programme (UNDP), SRTF completed a joint agriculture project in Ar Raqqa, rehabilitating a pumping station and irrigation channels (8.7 km) and clearing drainage lines (13.9 km). The project, with a budget of €764,000, directly benefitted 300 farmers and indirectly aided more than 18,760 residents. Other agricultural initiatives include support to cooperative farmers, distribution of seeds and fertilisers, and climate-smart agricultural practices in northern Syria.

Health

SRTF has funded support to health infrastructure including dialysis units. A 2024 health intervention in eastern Syria provided around 9,186 dialysis sessions to 123 patients (40% women), benefiting 229,140 people indirectly.

Water, Sanitation & Hygiene (WASH)

In December 2023, SRTF and UNDP launched a water and sanitation initiative in six districts of northern Aleppo intended to benefit 168,366 individuals, rehabilitating infrastructure, expanding networks, and creating jobs through cash-for-work programs.

Livelihoods

SRTF operates a revolving credit facility known as Siraj Financial Services (or Siraj Centres) targeting small and micro‑enterprises. In 2023, it expanded credit and business support to 1,170 entrepreneurs across sectors including agriculture, services, and trade, with tailored loan packages and training.

Emergency Response

Following the Turkey-Syria earthquakes in February 2023, SRTF established an Emergency Response Plan (ERP), approving an initial €1.3 million tranche to provide tents, medical kits, food, and other relief in northern Aleppo. In the same period, SRTF also facilitated bread distribution, mobilised health staff and medical supplies, and coordinated with implementing partners on emergency operations. In its 2023 annual report, SRTF documented 35 active projects with a total budget of €82.85 million, reaching 1.13 million individuals across priority sectors (agriculture, health, electricity, livelihoods). In 2024, it greenlit new health and agriculture projects—e.g. a €2.76 million wheat support initiative to benefit 2,000 farmers and a €0.55 million health program providing 6,240 dialysis sessions over 10 months. The total number of SRTF projects then stood at 71, with a cumulative budget of around €269.07 million.

== Achievements and impact ==
SRTF’s own reporting claims substantial reach: as of 2024, it asserts to have reached 14 million people with basic services, income support, and food security programming. In 2023, through 35 projects, 1.13 million individuals across sectors were benefitted. Sectorally, in 2023 the fund supported wheat production on 26,321 hectares by 12,438 farmers, resulting in ~100,000 tons in output. It also assisted bread production by supplying materials to mills and bakeries, alongside promoting renewable energy in health, water, and agricultural operations.

== Challenges and criticism ==
Public-facing sources seldom provide detailed critical assessments of SRTF, but some commonly observed challenges include:

- Access constraints: Security and territorial fragmentation impede project delivery in certain zones.
- Reliance on self-reporting: Much of the evidence of impact is derived from donor or fund reports, with limited independent evaluation in public domain.

Further critical appraisal by independent research or NGOs would strengthen the article’s balance and verifiability.
