= Sweden–Syria relations =

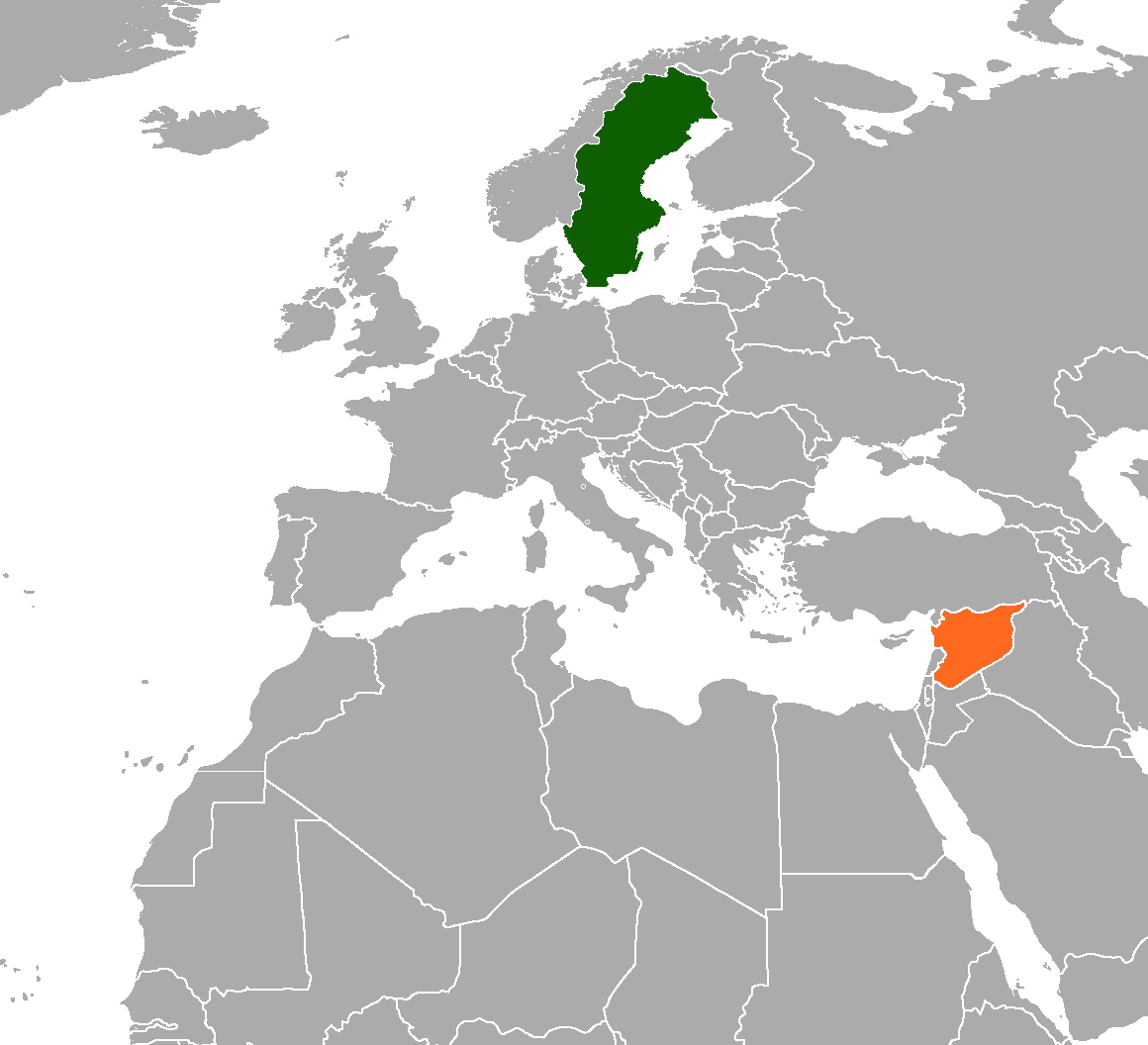
- Sweden: Syria

Sweden–Syria relations are the bilateral relations between the two countries. Both countries established diplomatic relations in 1947. Since the onset of the Syrian civil war, they have had suspended relations, and Sweden shared an embassy alongside Denmark in Beirut, Lebanon.

== History ==
Both countries established diplomatic relations on 24 June 1947, when Sweden's Envoy Extraordinary and Minister Plenipotentiary to Syria, Widar Bagge, presented his credentials. He was accredited with residence in Cairo. However, Sweden opened its embassy in Damascus in 1974, while Syria established its embassy in Stockholm in 2001.

In February 2006, several thousand demonstrators in Damascus set fire to the building housing the Danish, Swedish, and Chilean embassies, due to the Jyllands-Posten Muhammad cartoons controversy.

=== Syrian civil war ===
Due to worsening security conditions following the emergence of the Syrian civil war, the Swedish Ministry for Foreign Affairs scaled down operations and staffing at the Swedish Embassy in Damascus in 2012. Since then, the embassy had not been continuously staffed, with its functions primarily handled from Beirut.

In August 2012, Sweden hosted a conference for the Syrian National Council (SNC) to support a democratic future for Syria, funded with SEK 430,000 from the Swedish aid budget. However, concerns arose when SNC leaders, including Vice President Burhan Ghalioun, discussed supporting the Free Syrian Army, which raised questions about the alignment of Sweden's aid with democratic principles.

==== Humanitarian assistance ====
Sweden was a significant contributor to humanitarian efforts in Syria, focusing on alleviating the suffering caused by the prolonged conflict. The Swedish International Development Cooperation Agency (Sida) implemented strategies aimed at strengthening resilience, enhancing human security, and promoting human rights and democratic development in Syria and its neighboring countries. Sweden’s regional strategy for the Syria crisis, initially covering 2016–2020, was extended through 2023, with a total allocation of SEK 3.210 billion.

In 2019, Sweden contributed approximately US$2.7 million to UNICEF's emergency response, improving access to lifesaving assistance and basic services for vulnerable children and families in Syria.

In response to the February 2023 earthquake in Syria, Sweden provided SEK 80 million through Sida to support UN organizations, the Swedish Red Cross, and Islamic Relief Sweden. The aid included fuel, tents, and medical supplies for those affected.

=== Post-Assad relations ===
Following the fall of the Assad regime in December 2024, Sweden, along with several other European countries, temporarily suspended the processing of asylum applications from Syrians to reassess the evolving situation in Syria. In addition, Sweden continued monitoring the situation in Syria, balancing its humanitarian commitments with evolving migration policies. The Swedish government remained engaged in supporting Syria's transition and addressing the needs of both Syrian refugees and those within Syria's borders.

== See also ==
- Foreign relations of Sweden
- Foreign relations of Syria
- Syrians in Sweden
