= Syrians in Kuwait =

Total population
- 161,858 Syrian residents (2020); 1,468 Kuwaitis of Syrian origin (2024)

Regions with significant populations
- Kuwait City

Languages
- Arabic (Syrian Arabic), English

Religion
- Christianity and Islam

Syrians in Kuwait include migrants from Syria to Kuwait, as well as their descendants. The number of Syrians in Kuwait is estimated at 161,000 estimated (2020) and are mainly "Syrian expatriates who have overstayed in Kuwait". They were granted special one-year emergency permits in 2015 on the grounds that their work contracts had terminated, and they were hence unable to renew their passports due to technical issues at the Syrian Embassy of Kuwait. However, from 2018, Kuwaiti authorities no longer grant leniency to Syrians from deportations. All this is in contradiction to another article in the Orient News which imply that Kuwait has never exempted Syrians from regular residency laws and that even some Syrians deported from Kuwait in 2017 were killed upon arrival in Syria.

In June 2018, they abruptly stopped issuance and renewal of most visas to Syrians, including those on valid work contracts, though there is no mention about the few living in Kuwait on self-sponsorship visas which require at least funds of 10,000 Kuwaiti dinars and can be applied for and/or renewed only if the person is physically present in Kuwait. This would result in most Syrian residents in Kuwait being forced to leave the country or live as illegal aliens.

There continues to be a lack of clarity on the policy and conflicting information on the Arabian Gulf's (including Kuwait) role towards Syrian fleeing war. The legal status of refugee is non-existent in Kuwait as it is in all the Arab states of the Persian Gulf and there is no system to request for such status.

== See also ==
- Syrian diaspora
