= Syrians in Finland =

Syrians in Finland / Finnish Syrians Syyrialaiset Suomessa / Suomen syyrialaiset

Total population
- 6,748 Syrian citizens; 9,611 Syrian-born (2024)

Regions with significant populations
- Helsinki and Turku regions & Lahti

Languages
- Arabic and Finnish.

Religion
- Islam, Christianity, Druze

Related ethnic groups
- Syrians in Denmark, Syrians in Norway, Syrians in Sweden

Syrians in Finland (Arabic: السوريون في فنلندا, romanized: al-Sūrīyūn fī Finlandā) are people who have a background from the country of Syria and who now live in Finland. People can be born in Syria, have Syrian ancestry and/or be citizens of Syria. As of 2025, there were 9,611 people born in Syria living in Finland. Similarly, the number of people with Syrian citizenship was 6,748.

Syrians are the second largest Arab community in Finland after Iraqis.

== Migration ==
Nearly all Syrians in Finland have arrived as refugees. Syrians have been one of the smaller refugee groups in Finland in spite of the Syrian civil war, however they became the largest group in 2017.

== Demographics ==
Historical population
Year	Pop.	±% p.a.
1990	46	—
1995	134	+23.84%
2000	192	+7.46%
2005	288	+8.45%
2010	415	+7.58%
2015	1,961	+36.42%
2020	7,139	+29.49%
2025	9,611	+6.13%
Syrian-born. Source: Statistics Finland

People born in Syria and living in Finland, according to Statistics Finland.

Country of birth Syria by municipality (2024)
Municipality	Population
Whole country	9,408
Helsinki	1,317
Espoo	1,066
Vantaa	988
Turku	621
Lahti	572
Tampere	551
Kuopio	289
Oulu	269
Pietarsaari	216
Jyväskylä	178
Hyvinkää	156
Vaasa	156
Joensuu	147
Tornio	146
Hämeenlinna	138
Porvoo	130
Lappeenranta	102
Kerava	97
Lohja	91
Mikkeli	90
Forssa	84
Iisalmi	84
Seinäjoki	81
Pori	73
Nurmijärvi	70
Rovaniemi	69
Kaarina	67
Tuusula	66
Kemi	61
Varkaus	61
Suomussalmi	58
Järvenpää	55
Parainen	55
Kotka	52
Ylitornio	51
Kajaani	50
Kouvola	48
Sipoo	42
Outokumpu	40
Karkkila	39
Kokkola	37
Vihti	37
Heinävesi	34
Rauma	33
Salo	33
Kauniainen	32
Pedersöre	32
Pieksämäki	32
Mariehamn	31
Raisio	31
Larsmo	30
Nykarleby	28
Riihimäki	27
Kronoby	25
Äänekoski	25
Kirkkonummi	24
Pudasjärvi	24
Hollola	23
Kuusamo	21
Lieto	20
Imatra	18
Mäntsälä	18
Heinola	17
Raseborg	17
Tervola	14
Korsholm	13
Eura	11
Mänttä-Vilppula	11
Tammela	10

People with Syrian citizenship living in Finland according to Statistics Finland.

Citizens of Syria by municipality (2024)
Municipality	Population
Whole country	7,629
Helsinki	786
Espoo	777
Vantaa	657
Turku	507
Lahti	455
Tampere	450
Kuopio	280
Oulu	213
Pietarsaari	178
Tornio	172
Joensuu	158
Vaasa	141
Hämeenlinna	139
Jyväskylä	136
Porvoo	132
Hyvinkää	129
Forssa	107
Kerava	102
Lappeenranta	98
Mikkeli	92
Seinäjoki	86
Iisalmi	84
Lohja	82
Rovaniemi	73
Tuusula	71
Varkaus	71
Suomussalmi	68
Kemi	64
Outokumpu	61
Kajaani	60
Nurmijärvi	59
Parainen	57
Pori	56
Kaarina	52
Ylitornio	50
Järvenpää	47
Kotka	47
Vihti	46
Sipoo	43
Heinävesi	42
Karkkila	37
Kokkola	35
Larsmo	30
Pieksämäki	28
Kouvola	27
Kauniainen	26
Äänekoski	26
Salo	25
Nykarleby	25
Riihimäki	23
Kuusamo	22
Mäntsälä	22
Tervola	22
Heinola	21
Imatra	21
Pudasjärvi	21
Kirkkonummi	20
Mariehamn	20
Rauma	16
Eura	15
Pedersöre	15
Kronoby	14
Raisio	14
Tammela	12
Mänttä-Vilppula	11
Hollola	10
Sodankylä	10

== Organizations ==
The most active Syrian organization in Finland is Suomi-Syyria Ystävyysseura.
