= Syrian diaspora =

People of Syrian origin living abroad

Total population
- From 8 to possibly 15 million

Languages
- Native: Syrian Arabic; Also Brazilian Portuguese, Dutch, Spanish, French, English, German, Swedish, Kurdish, Finnish, Turkish

Religion
- Islam, Christianity, Alawites, Druze, Syrian Jews

Map of the Syrian diaspora around the world. Syria +1,000,000 +100,000 +10,000 +1,000

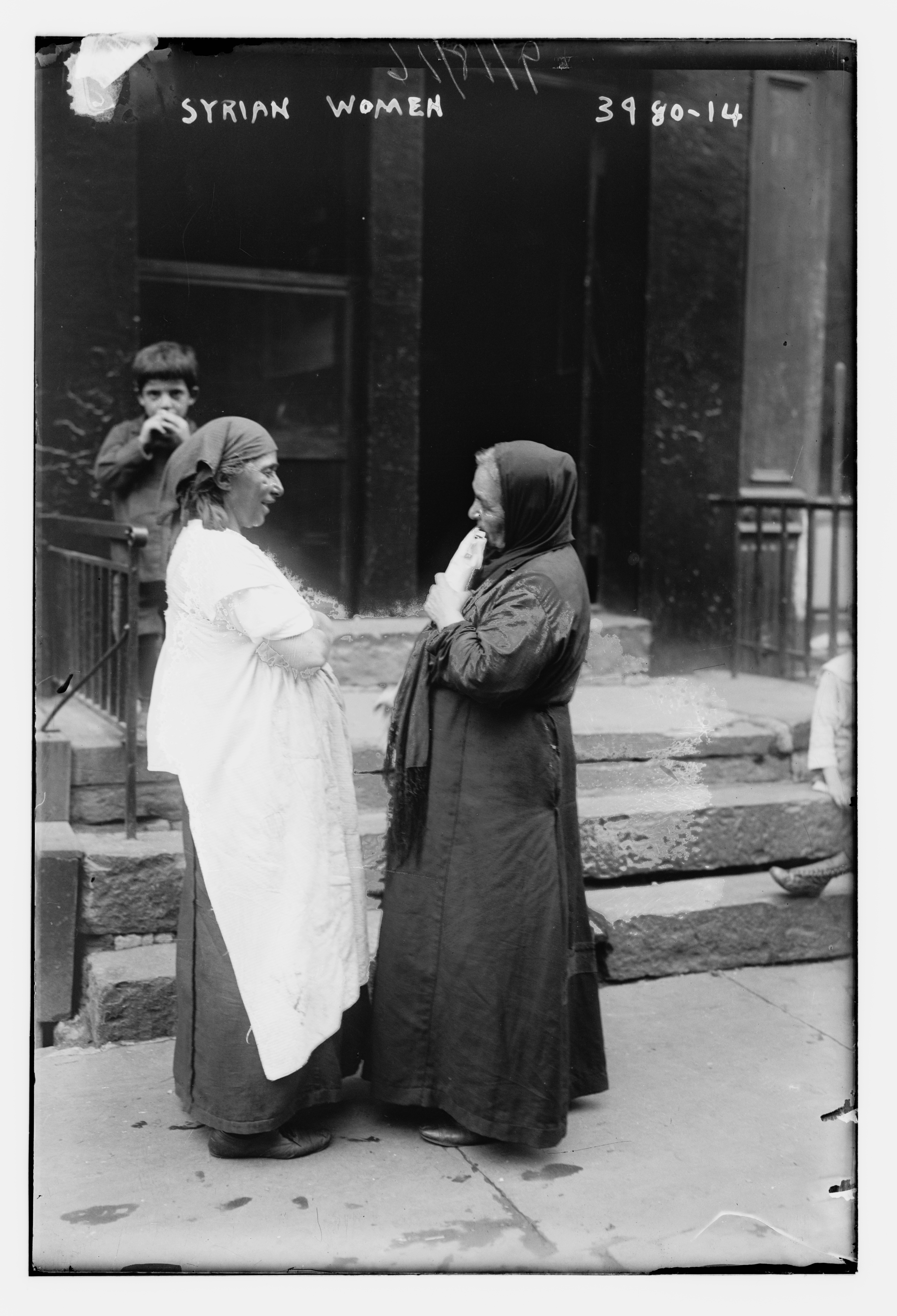
Two Syrian women in NYC, 1916.

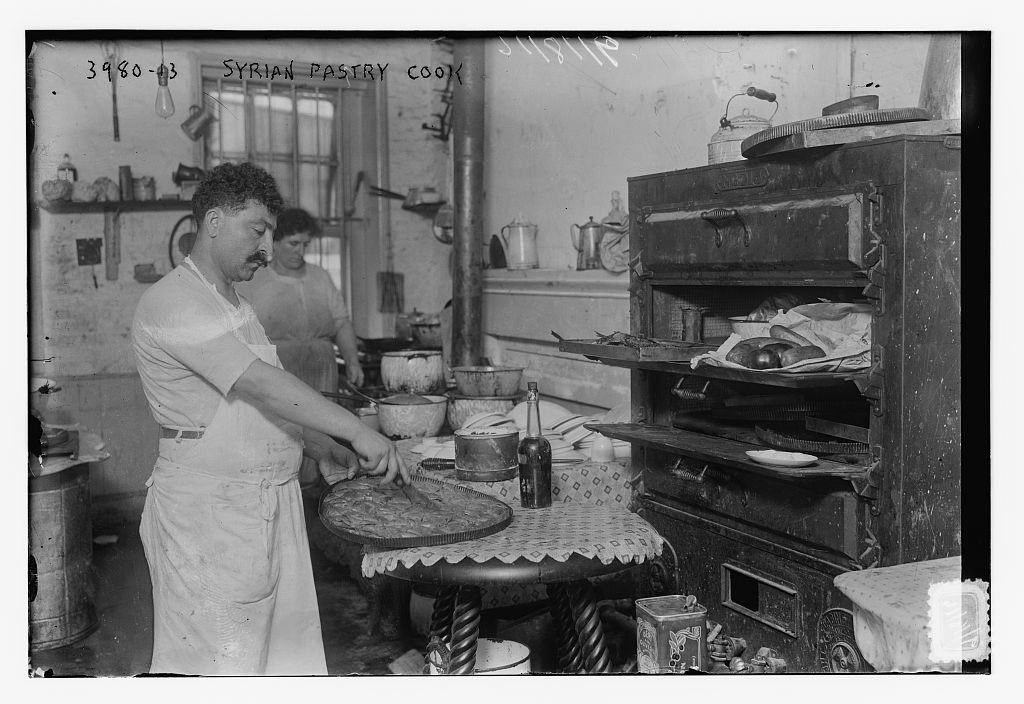
Syrian baklava maker in Little Syria in 1916.

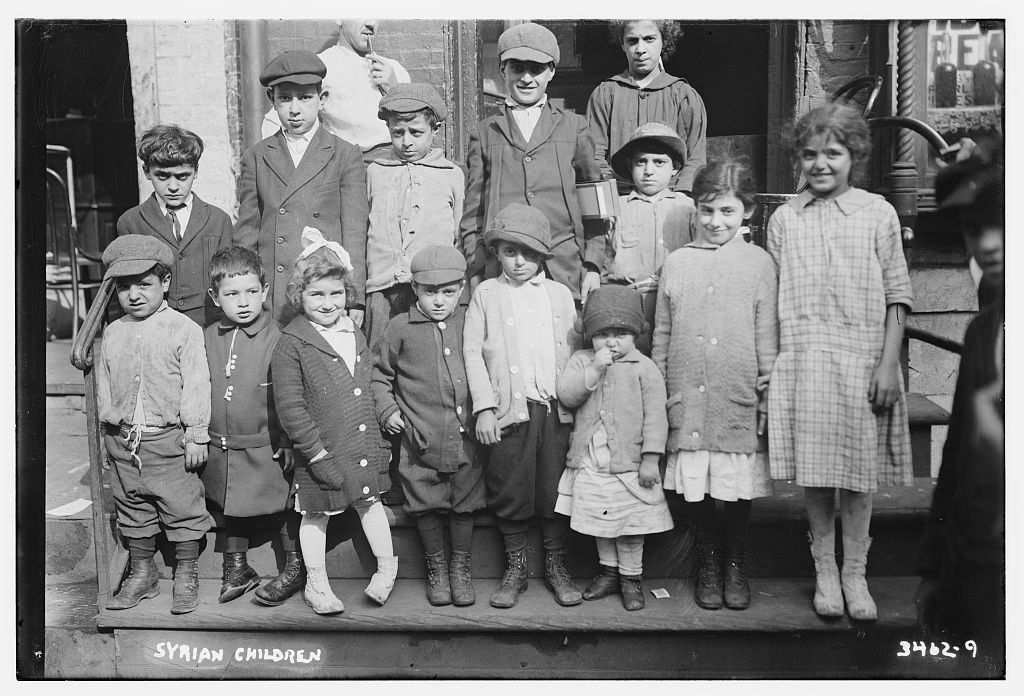
Syrian immigrant children on Washington Street in Lower Manhattan in 1916.

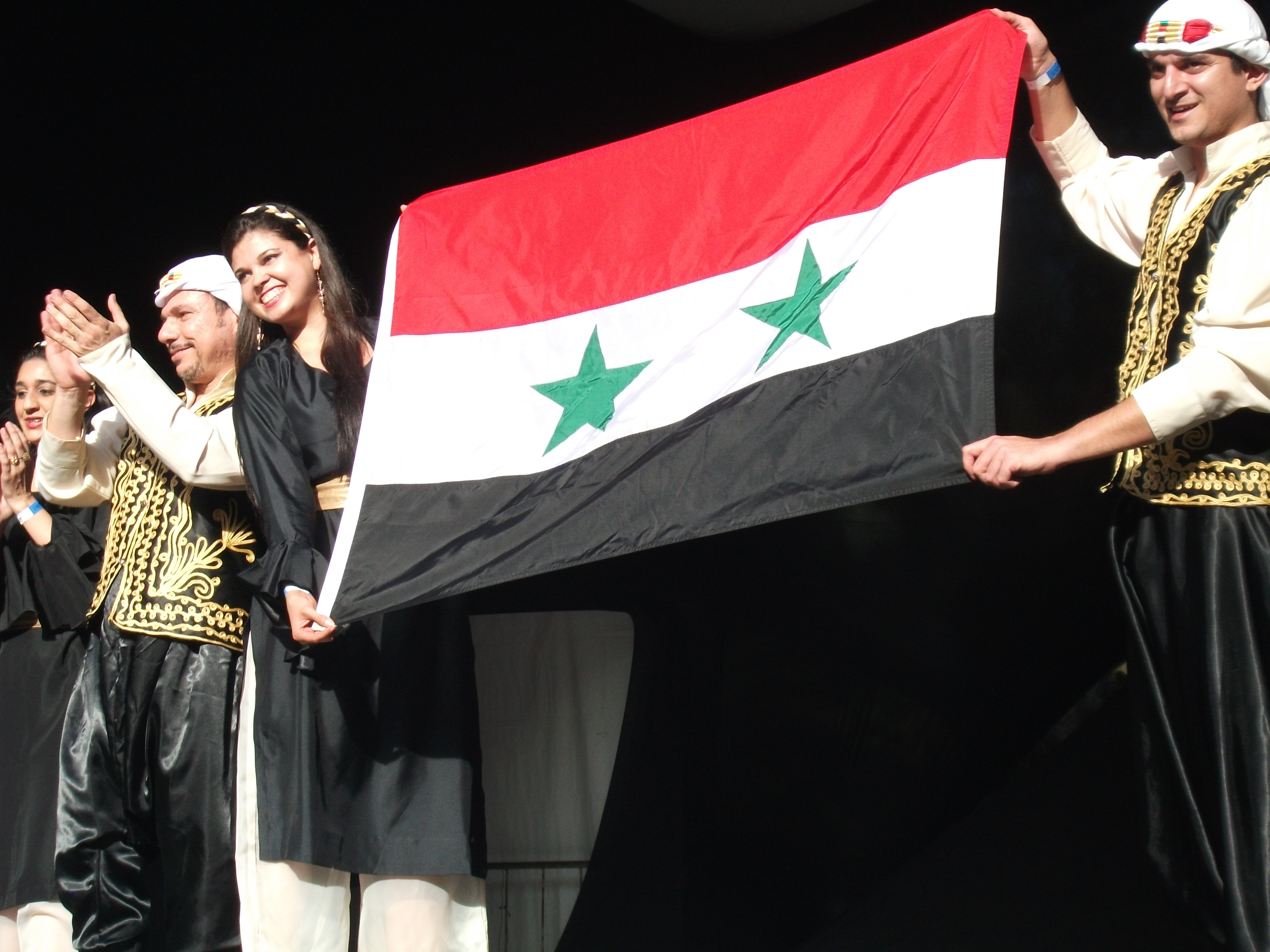
Syrian folk group in Brazil, displaying the former flag of Syria.

Syrian diaspora refers to Syrian people and their descendants who chose or were forced to emigrate from Syria and now reside in other countries as immigrants, or as refugees of the Syrian Civil War.

The estimated number of people of Syrian descent residing outside Syria ranges from 8 to 13 million. The UNHCR reports that 4.9 million global refugees in 2015 were Syrian nationals. The Syrian nationality law does not grant diaspora Syrians an automatic right of return to Syria, and under the controversial 2018 Absentees Law, the Assad regime confiscated property of millions of Syrians.

== Populations ==
Country	Estimate	Upper Estimate	Region	Country article in English Wikipedia
+				
Brazil	1,000,000 according to a research conducted by IBGE in 2008, covering only the states of Amazonas, Paraíba, São Paulo, Rio Grande do Sul, Mato Grosso and Distrito Federal, 0.9% of caucasoid Brazilian respondents said they had family origins in the Middle East	4,000,000 people of Syrian ancestry (according to Brazilian government)	South America	Syrian Brazilian
Turkey	2,198,570 registered (November 2026)		Europe; Asia	Syrians in Turkey
Lebanon	532,357 registered (December 2025)		Middle East	Syrians in Lebanon
Jordan	404,047 registered (February 2026)	1,400,000 estimated (August 2015)	Middle East	Syrians in Jordan
Germany	1,281,000 (2023)		European Union	Syrians in Germany
Argentina	1,500,000	2,000,000	South America	Syrian Argentine
Saudi Arabia	449,314 (2022 census)	449,000	Middle East	Syrians in Saudi Arabia
Iraq	310‚000 estimated (December 2024)		Middle East	Syrian in iraq
Sudan	250,000 estimated (2017)		Africa	
United Arab Emirates	>250,000 estimated (2016)		Middle East	Syrians in the United Arab Emirates
Sweden	250 000 (2021)		European Union	Syrians in Sweden
United States	187,331 (by ancestry, 2016 U.S Census Bureau)		North America	Syrian American
Egypt	107,976 registered (February 2026)		North Africa and Middle East	
Kuwait	120,000 estimated (2015)		Middle East	Syrians in Kuwait
Canada	98,250 (by ancestry, 2021 Census)	130,000	North America	Syrian Canadian
Greece	88,204 (2015)		European Union	Syrians in Greece
France	80,000 (2024)		European Union	Syrians in France
Austria	68,000 (2019)		European Union	Syrians in Austria
Algeria	50,000 – 84,700		North Africa and Middle East	Syrians in Algeria
Australia	29,096 (Syrian-born resident, 2021)		Oceania	Syrian Australians
Israel	24,800 (2019)	115,000	Middle East	
Venezuela	15,632 (Syrian-born resident, 2015)	1,000,000 Venezuelans of Syrian descent	Latin America	Syrian Venezuelan
Ivory Coast	15,000 (Syrian-born, 2024)		Sub-Saharan Africa	Syrians in Ivory Coast
Finland	10,403 (2022)		European Union	Syrians in Finland
Guadeloupe (Overseas France)	10,000		Caribbean	
United Kingdom	8,848 England & Wales unknown in Scotland and 2,000 in Northern Ireland. (2019)		Europe	Syrians in the United Kingdom

== See also ==
- Lebanese diaspora
- List of Syrian refugee camps in Jordan
- Little Syria, Manhattan
- Refugees of the Syrian Civil War
- Refugees of the Syrian Civil War in Jordan
- Syrians in Lebanon
- Syrian refugee camps
