= Great Mosque of Sarmin =

Former mosque in Sermin, Idlib, Syria

- جامع الكبير سرمين

Religion
- Affiliation: Islam (former)
- Ecclesiastical or organizational status: Mosque (1259–2023)
- Status: Destroyed

Location
- Location: Sarmin, Idlib Governorate
- Country: Syria

Architecture
- Type: Islamic architecture
- Style: Mamluk architecture
- Completed: 657 AH (1258/1259 CE)
- Destroyed: October 4, 2023 (Syrian civil war)

Specifications
- Dome: Nine
- Minaret: One

The Great Mosque of Sarmin (Arabic: جامع الكبير سرمين, romanized: Jami' al-Kabir (Sarmin)), also called the Old Mosque of Sarmin and the Mosque of Idlib Sarmin, is a former mosque that was located in Sarmin, in the Idlib Governorate of Syria.

Believed to have been completed prior to 657 AH (1258/1259 CE), the mosque was significantly damaged on 4 October 2023, during the Syrian civil war.

== Overview ==
One of the most distinct architectural features of the mosque was the nine domes over its prayer hall. According to inscriptions, the mosque was renovated in 660 AH (1261/1262 CE) and possibly restored in 705 AH (1305/1306 CE). The mosque's plan is centered on a large, rectangular sahn bordered by arcades and a prayer hall on the southern qibla. The prayer hall is shallow. The qibla aisle is divided into nine bays, each one covered by a small dome.

== See also ==
- Islam in Syria
- List of mosques in Syria
- List of heritage sites damaged during Syrian civil war
- Late medieval domes
