= Khaled al-Asaad =

Syrian archaeologist (1932–2015)

- خالد الأسعد
- Al-Asaad in 2002
- Born: Khaled Mohamad al-Asaad; 1 January 1932; Palmyra, First Syrian Republic
- Died: 18 August 2015 (aged 83); Palmyra, Ba'athist Syria
- Cause of death: Decapitation
- Education: Damascus University
- Occupation: Archaeologist
- Title: Head of antiquities in Palmyra
- Honours: Order of Civil Merit of the Syrian Arab Republic (excellent class); Ordre national du Mérite (France); Order of Merit of the Republic of Poland; Order of Merit of the Republic of Tunisia

Khaled Mohamad al-Asaad (Arabic: خالد الأسعد; Arabic pronunciation: [ɐlʔæsʕæd]; 1 January 1932 – 18 August 2015) was a Syrian archaeologist who was head of antiquities in the ancient city of Palmyra, a UNESCO World Heritage Site. He held this position for over forty years. Al-Asaad was publicly beheaded by the Islamic State on 18 August 2015, at the age of 83.

== Early life, education, and family ==
Al-Asaad was born in 1932 in Palmyra, where he spent most of his life. He held a diploma in history and was educated at Damascus University. Al-Asaad was the father of six sons and five daughters, one of whom was named Zenobia after the well-known queen.

== Career ==
=== Archaeologist ===
During his career, al-Asaad excavated and restored ancient Palmyra. He became the principal custodian of the Palmyra site in 1963, a position he held for forty years. His expeditions focused on the late third-century ramparts of Palmyra and he worked with American, Polish, German, French, and Swiss archaeological missions. His main achievement was the elevation of Palmyra to a World Heritage Site.

Al-Asaad was fluent in Palmyrene Aramaic and regularly published and translated important corpora of Palmyrene inscriptions.

From 1974 onward, Al-Asaad organised exhibitions of Palmyran antiques.

When he retired in 2003, his son Walid took over his work at Palmyra. They both were reportedly detained by the Islamic State in August 2015, but Walid survived.

=== Politics ===
It is believed that he joined the Syrian Socialist Ba'ath Party around 1954. However, it is unclear whether he was an active supporter of the Syrian government of Bashar al-Assad. According to The Economist, some have claimed he was a "staunch supporter" of Assad.

== Death ==
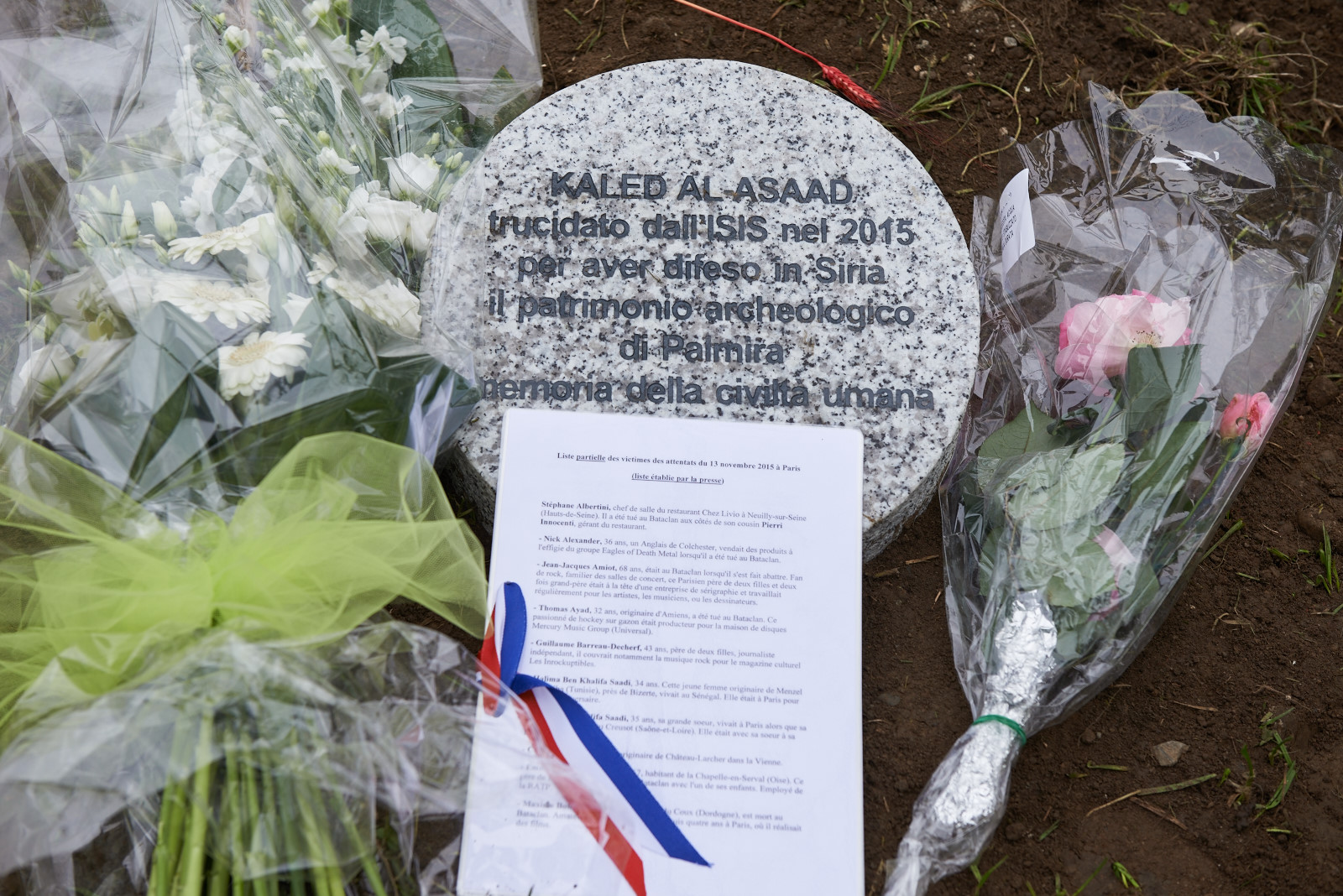
Memorial for Khaled al-Asaad in Italy

In May 2015, modern Palmyra and the adjacent ancient city came under the control of the Islamic State. Al-Asaad helped evacuate the city museum prior to the Islamic State's takeover, but was himself captured by the terrorist organisation. The Islamic State then tortured al-Asaad in an attempt to discover the location of the ancient artifacts that he helped hide. He was murdered in Palmyra on 18 August 2015 at the age of eighty-three.

The New York Times reported:

After detaining him for weeks, the jihadists dragged him on Tuesday to a public square where a masked swordsman cut off his head in front of a crowd, Mr. Asaad's relatives said. His blood-soaked body was then suspended with red twine by its wrists from a traffic light, his head resting on the ground between his feet, his glasses still on, according to a photo distributed on social media by Islamic State supporters.

Al-Asaad's son told journalist Jeremy Bowen that he was killed for refusing to pledge allegiance to the Islamic State.

Following al-Asaad's death, the Islamic State hung a placard on his corpse listing his alleged "crimes": being an "apostate", representing Syria at "infidel conferences", serving as "the director of idolatry" in Palmyra, visiting "Heretic Iran", and communicating with "a brother in the Syrian security services".

His body was reportedly displayed in the new section of Palmyra (Tadmur) and then in the ancient section, the treasures of which the Islamic State had already demolished.

In February 2021, Syrian state sources reported the discovery of al-Asaad's body in the countryside 10km east of Palmyra. It was later ruled as a false report, and in April 2021 Khaled's family vowed to continue the search for his remains.

Along with al-Asaad, Qassem Abdullah Yehya, the deputy director of the DGAM Laboratories, also protected the Palmyra site, and was murdered by the Islamic State while on duty on 12 August 2015. He was thirty-seven years old.

=== Reactions ===
- The Chief of Syrian Antiquities, Maamoun Abdulkarim, condemned al-Asaad's death, calling him "a scholar who gave such memorable services to the place Palmyra and to history". He called al-Asaad's killers a "bad omen on Palmyra".
- Dario Franceschini, the Italian Minister of Cultural Heritage and Activities and Tourism, announced that the flags of all Italian museums would be flown at half-mast in honor of al-Asaad.
- UNESCO and its general director Irina Bokova condemned al-Asaad's murder, saying "They killed him because he would not betray his deep commitment to Palmyra. Here is where he dedicated his life."
- The United Kingdom and France released statements condemning the murder and destruction at Palmyra.
- Expressing hope that the killers would one day be brought to justice, India's Aligarh Historians Society said, "Civilized people, irrespective of country or religion, must unite in their support for all political and military measures designed to achieve this end, especially those being made by the governments of Syria and Iraq."
- Persian-American poet Kaveh Akbar published the poem "Palmyra" in response to al-Asaad's death. The poem's dedication reads "after Khaled al-Asaad".

== Honours and medals ==
=== Syrian honors ===
- Order of Civil Merit (2015) - Awarded posthumously

=== Foreign honors ===
- Poland – Order of Merit of the Republic of Poland (1998)
- Italy – On 17 October 2015, the President of Italy inaugurated the rehabilitated Arsenali della Repubblica in Pisa which was renamed after al-Asaad.

=== Film ===
- A 2019 film titled Dam al Nakhl (Blood of the Palm Trees) portrays al-Asaad's brave resistance against the Islamic State.

== Selected publications ==
- Asaad, Khaled (1980). Nouvelles découvertes archéologiques en Syrie [New archaeological discoveries in Syria] (in French). Damascus: Direction générale des antiquités et des musées. OCLC 602249622.; 2nd edition 1990.
- Asaad, Khaled; Bounni, Adnan (1984). Palmyra. Geschichte, Denkmäler, Museum (in German). Damascus: Direction générale des antiquités et des musées.
- Gawlikowski, Michael; Asaad, Khaled (1995). Palmyra and the Aramaeans. ARAM periodical. Vol. 7. Oxford: The ARAM Society for Syro-Mesopotamian Studies. OCLC 68075497.
- Asaad, Khaled (1995). "Restoration Work at Palmyra". ARAM Periodical. 7 (1): 9–17. doi:10.2143/ARAM.7.1.2002213. OCLC 4632456923.
- Asaad, Khaled; Yon, Jean-Baptiste (2001), Inscriptions de Palmyre. Promenades épigraphiques dans la ville antique de Palmyre (= Guides archéologiques de l'Institut Français d'Archéologie du Proche-Orient Bd. 3). Institut Français d'Archéologie du Proche-Orient, Beirut 2001; ISBN 2-912738-12-1.
- Asaad, Khaled; Schmidt-Colinet, Andreas (eds) (2013), Palmyras Reichtum durch weltweiten Handel. Archäologische Untersuchungen im Bereich der hellenistischen Stadt. 2 vols. Holzhausen, Vienna 2013; ISBN 978-3-902868-63-3, ISBN 978-3-902868-64-0.

== See also ==
- Destruction of cultural heritage by the Islamic State
- Syrian Archaeological Heritage Under Threat
- Syro-Palestinian archaeology
- Virtual visit of Palmyra dedicated to Khaled al-Asaad
