= Syrian Archaeological Heritage Under Threat =

Syrian Archaeological Heritage Under Threat, also known as Syrian Archaeological Heritage in Danger, Patrimoine Syrien or Le patrimoine archéologique syrien en danger (Arabic: الآثار السورية في خطر) is a cultural heritage activist group that runs a Facebook page documenting the damage to Syrian and World Heritage during the Syrian Civil War.

The group was founded by Ali Othman and is led by several Syrian and European archaeologists including Ghayad Daoud, Shaker al Shbib and Taysir al Halebi. The spokesman for the group is Spanish archaeologist Rodrigo Martin, who remarked about the damage being done during the conflict "If this continues, the situation will be like in Iraq, it could mean that a heritage that is of great importance for the whole world destroyed."

The group is not entirely based in Syria, coordinating with colleagues and other sources inside to post photographs and reports. The Facebook page compiles a list of heritage sites damaged during the Syrian Civil War and the aim of the group is to make the world pay greater attention to the heritage catastrophe likely to occur in the area and disseminate information about it.
