= Syrian civil war =

2011–2024 armed conflict in Syria

- Part of the Syrian revolution, Arab Spring, Arab Winter, War against the Islamic State, War on terror, Kurdish–Turkish and Arab–Israeli conflicts, Iran–Israel and Iran–Saudi proxy wars
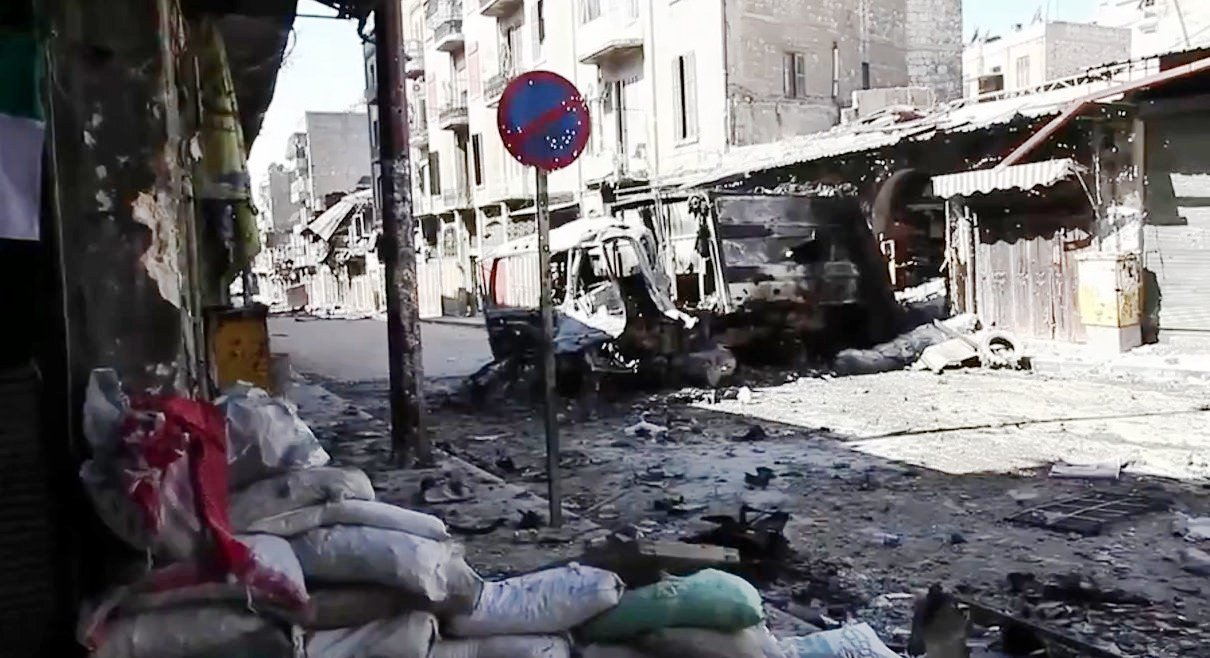
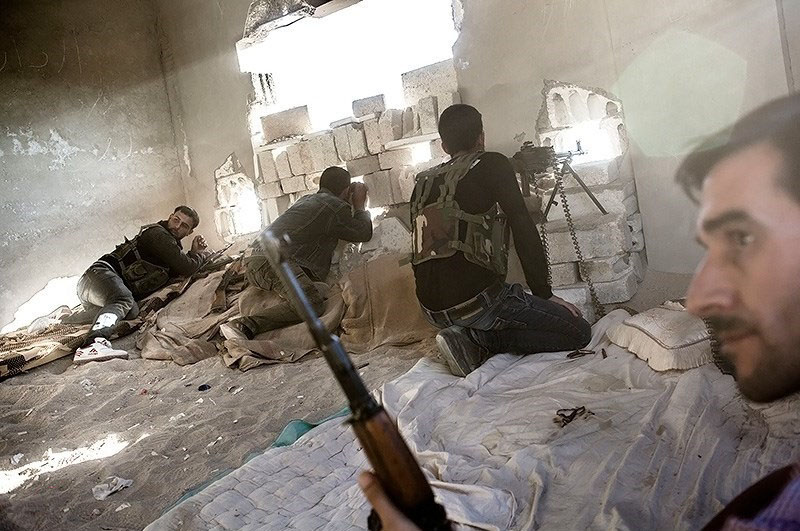
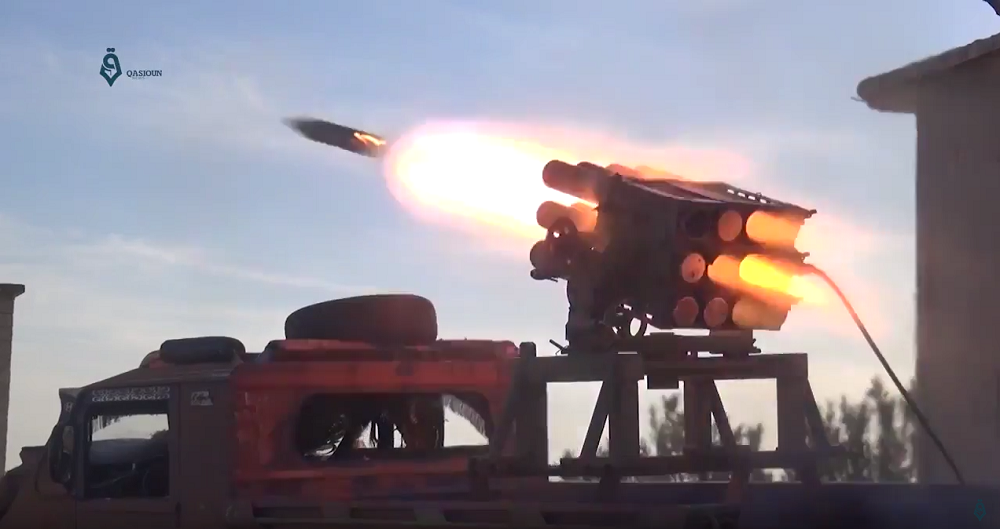
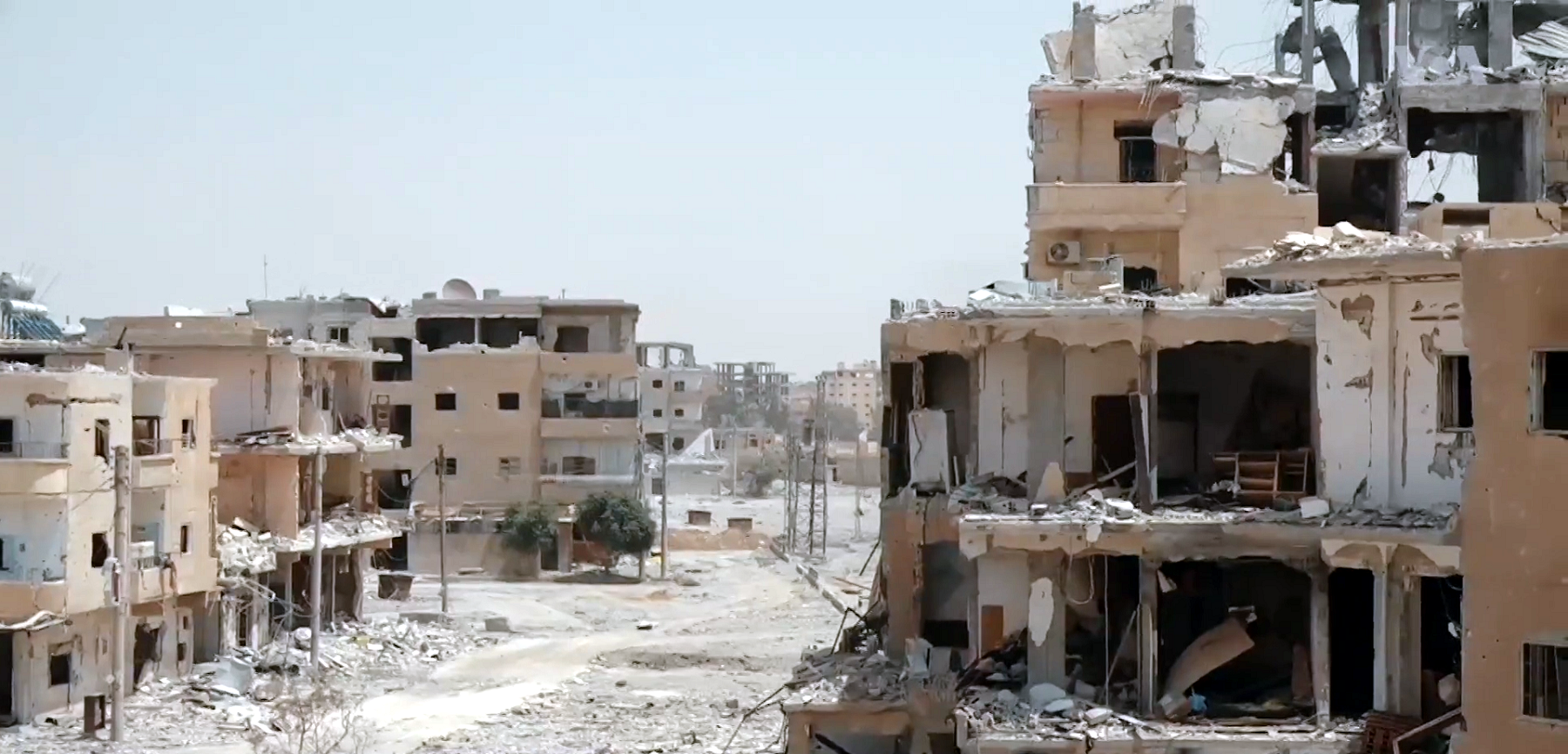
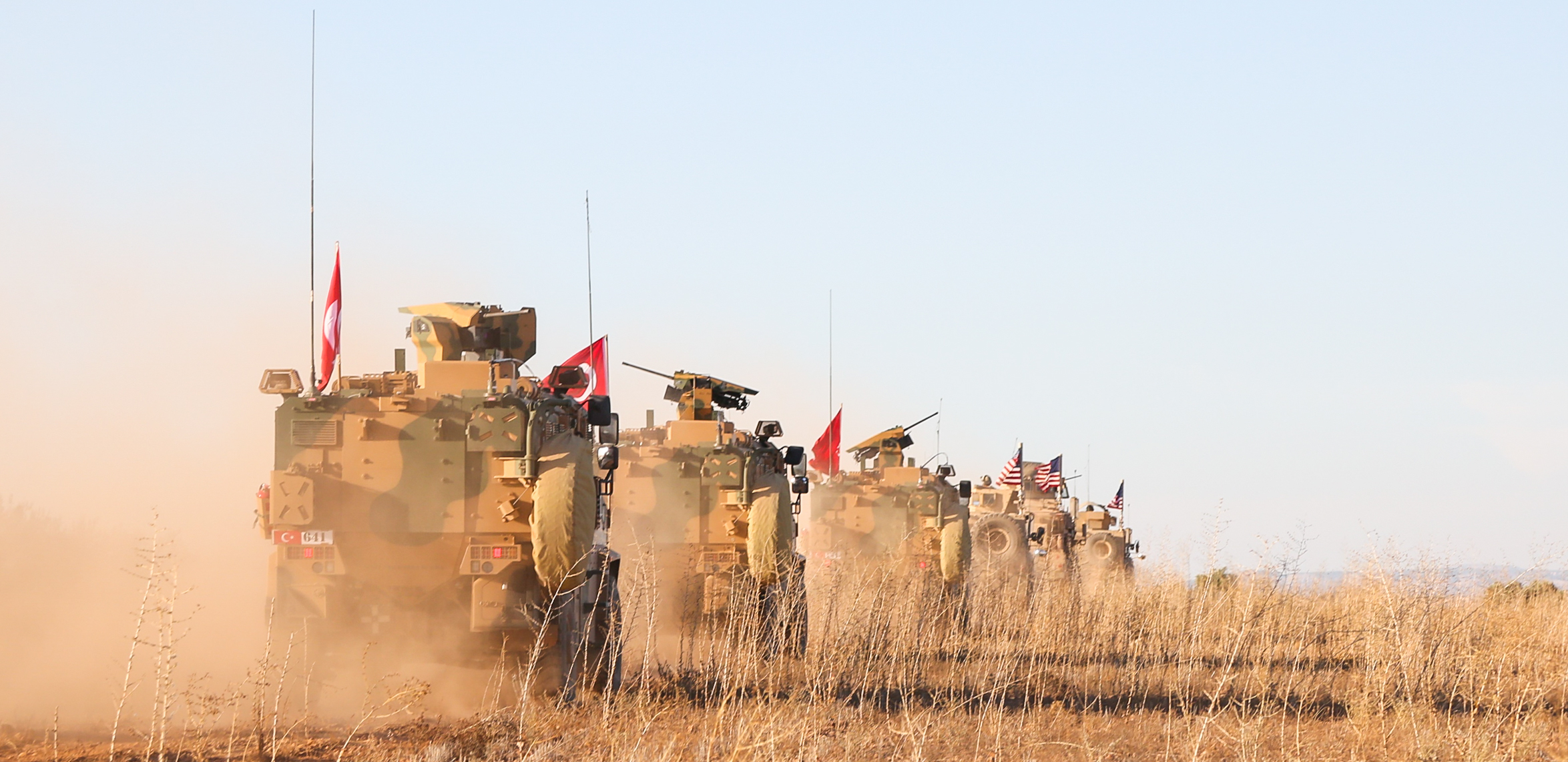
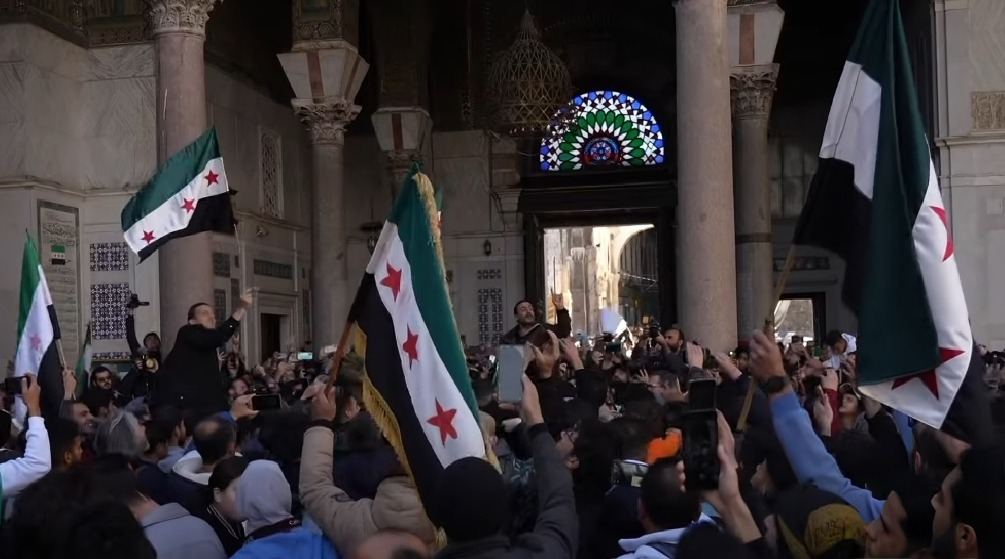
- From top to bottom, left to right: Destroyed vehicles during the Battle of Aleppo, 2012; Kurdish People's Protection Units fighters during the Battle of Ras al-Ayn, 2013; Opposition rocket artillery bombards government positions during an offensive on Hama, 2017; A neighborhood in Raqqa after being recaptured from the Islamic State, 2017; Turkish and U.S. troops on a joint patrol in northern Syria, 2018; Syrians celebrating the Fall of Assad, 2024
Date	15 March 2011 (Note: Large-scale demonstrations in Syria began on 15 March 2011 and were subsequently suppressed by force by the Assad regime, it eventually led to an all-out civil war. In July 2011, defectors from the Assad regime's security apparatus formed an organized rebel group called the Free Syrian Army to protect protesters and strike back at Assad. The International Committee of the Red Cross said the violence in Syria had become so widespread that it was in a state of civil war in July 2012.) – 8 December 2024 (Note: With the Ba'athist regime prevailing, the hostilities were mostly put on hold from 6 March 2020 until 27 November 2024, after which the Syrian opposition launched a campaign of quick successful military offensives in Northwestern Syria, toppling the Assad regime on 8 December.) (13 years, 8 months and 23 days)
Location	Syria (with spillovers in neighboring countries, especially Iraq and Lebanon)
Result	Syrian opposition and allied victory; See Aftermath

Belligerents
- Full list of factions

Casualties and losses
- Total deaths 656,493+ Civilian deaths 219,223–306,887+ (Note: According to the Syrian Observatory for Human Rights (which gave an estimate of 199,068 civilian deaths) and Syrian Network for Human Rights (which gave an estimate of 231,000 civilian deaths), 88–91% of these deaths were caused by the Assad regime and its allies. However, the methodology of both organisations has been criticised for being unreliable.); Displaced people: 6.7 million internally; 6.6 million externally (refugees) (March 2021); See Casualties of the Syrian civil war for details

The Syrian civil war was an armed conflict that began with the Syrian revolution in March 2011, when popular discontent with the Ba'athist regime ruled by Bashar al-Assad triggered large-scale protests and pro-democracy rallies across Syria, as part of the wider Arab Spring. The Assad regime responded to the protests with lethal force, which led to a series of defections, the emergence of armed opposition groups, and the civilian uprising descending into a civil war. The war lasted almost 14 years and culminated in the fall of the Assad regime in December 2024. Many sources regard this as the end of the civil war even though clashes have continued into 2026.

The Syrian opposition to Bashar al-Assad began as an insurgency, forming groups such as the Free Syrian Army (FSA). Anti-Assad forces received arms and training from Qatar, Turkey, a United States-led program, and others. Pro-Assad forces received financial and military support from Iran, Russia, and Hezbollah: Iran launched a military intervention in support of the Syrian government in 2013, and Russia followed in 2015. By this time, rebels had established the Syrian Interim Government after capturing the regional capitals of Raqqa in 2013 and Idlib in 2015. Use of chemical weapons during the war, predominantly by Syrian government forces, was the deadliest since the Iran–Iraq War. The Ghouta sarin attack was followed by unsuccessful international attempts to eliminate Syria's chemical weapons through military action or diplomacy.

In 2014, the Islamic State (IS) seized control over Eastern Syria and Western Iraq, prompting a United States-led coalition to launch an aerial bombing campaign against the IS, while providing ground support and supplies to the Syrian Democratic Forces (SDF), a Kurdish-dominated coalition led by the People's Defense Units (YPG). In 2016, Turkey launched an invasion of northern Syria in response to the creation of the Kurdish-led Autonomous Administration of North and East Syria (Rojava), while also establishing the Syrian National Army (SNA) to help it fight ISIS and pro-Assad forces.

The 2016 victory of the Syrian Arab Army (SAA) and other pro-Assad forces in the four-year Battle of Aleppo marked the recapture of what had been Syria's largest city before the war. In Idlib Governorate, the Hay'at Tahrir al-Sham (HTS) militia formed the Syrian Salvation Government, a technocratic, Islamist administration that governed the region from 2017 until 2024. Meanwhile, IS was territorially defeated in the Syrian Desert, Central Syria, Raqqa, and Deir ez-Zor campaigns. In December 2019, the SAA and its allies launched an offensive on Idlib province, which resulted in a ceasefire lasting from 2020 until November 2024. During this period, there were regular clashes between pro-Assad forces and HTS.

HTS launched a major offensive in November 2024, joined by the SNA. Aleppo fell in three days as the SAA began to collapse, giving momentum to revolutionaries across the country. HTS soon captured Hama and began to advance south towards Homs. Southern rebels and the Syrian Free Army launched their own offensive, capturing Daraa, Suwayda, and Palmyra. On 8 December, Bashar al-Assad fled to Moscow as Homs fell to HTS while southern rebels entered Damascus. Assad's prime minister remained in Damascus and transferred power to a provisional government. Israel launched an invasion of Syria's Quneitra Governorate (including the UN buffer zone) from its 58-year occupation of the Syrian Golan Heights.

At the Syrian Revolution Victory Conference held at the Presidential Palace in Damascus in January 2025, the new government announced the dissolution of several armed militias and their integration into the Syrian Ministry of Defense, as well as the appointment of former HTS leader Ahmed al-Sharaa as president of Syria. Later that year, a Druze insurgency formed in the southern Suweida Governorate following clashes with the government and alleged sectarian violence.

== Overview ==
The Syrian civil war was fought by several factions from 2011 to December 2024. The Syrian Arab Armed Forces, alongside its domestic and foreign allies, represented the Syrian Arab Republic ruled by Bashar al-Assad's Ba'athist government. As the civil war continued, alternative governments rose in opposition to Assad's rule, such as the Syrian Interim Government (SIG), a big-tent alliance of pro-democratic, nationalist opposition groups whose armed forces consisted of the Syrian National Army (SNA) and allied Free Syrian militias. Another anti-Assad faction was the Syrian Salvation Government (SSG), whose armed wing was represented by a coalition of nationalist and Sunni Islamist militias led by Hay'at Tahrir al-Sham (HTS). Independent of the SIG and SSG was the Autonomous Administration of North and East Syria (AANES), also known as Rojava, whose military force was the Syrian Democratic Forces (SDF), a multi-ethnic, Arab-majority force led by the Kurdish People's Defense Units (YPG). Other competing factions included jihadist organizations such as the Islamic State (IS) and al-Qaeda's Syrian branch Hurras al-Din (the successor of Al-Nusra Front).

The civil war also served as a proxy war as foreign countries–including Iran, Russia, Turkey and the United States–became directly involved in the conflict, providing support to opposing factions. Iran, Russia and Lebanese Hezbollah supported Assad's government militarily, with Iran intervening in 2013 and Russia conducting airstrikes and ground operations in the country beginning in September 2015. In 2014, the US-led international coalition officially began conducting air and ground operations–primarily against the Islamic State, al-Qaeda elements such as Hurras al-Din and the Khorasan group and occasionally against pro-Assad forces–and militarily and logistically supporting factions such as the SDF and the Syrian Free Army. Turkish forces occupied parts of northern Syria and fought the SDF, Assad government and Islamic State alike while actively supporting the SNA. Between 2011 and 2017, fighting from the Syrian civil war spilled over into neighboring Lebanon as opponents and supporters of the Syrian government traveled there to attack each other on Lebanese soil. While officially neutral, Israel exchanged border fire and conducted repeated attacks against Hezbollah and Iranian elements inside Syria, whose presence in the country it viewed as a security threat.

Violence in the war peaked during 2012–2017 amid rebel and government ground offensives alongside sectarian and Islamist violence. By 2019 the Islamic State in Syria had been forced into an insurgency after years of territorial and personnel loss due to clashing with most other factions, including opposing jihadist groups, Assad's forces and allies, Kurdish conquest and US-led operations. International organizations accused virtually all belligerents involved—the Assad government, the Islamic State, opposition groups, Iran, Russia, Turkey and the US-led coalition—of severe human rights violations and massacres. The conflict caused a major refugee crisis, with millions of people fleeing to neighboring countries such as Turkey, Lebanon and Jordan; however, a sizable minority also sought refuge in countries outside of the Middle East, with Germany alone accepting over half a million Syrians from 2011 to 2019. Numerous peace initiatives were launched since the start of the war, including several led by the United Nations, but fighting continued.

After the 2020 Idlib ceasefire, frontline clashes between Syrian government and rebel forces mostly subsided and the war effectively became a stalemate, although sporadic clashes and minor skirmishes between opposing factions continued. From 2021 to late 2024, Assad was consolidating power and slowly reversing the diplomatic isolation resulting from the war, however this was halted after lightning offensives by opposition groups across the country successfully collapsed his regime and caused him to flee to Russia. The civil war concluded with the creation of a new provisional government which integrated elements of both the SIG and SSG alternative governments. The transitional government, led by Ahmed al-Sharaa, would go on to experience lower-level fighting within the country in the aftermath of the war, while also overseeing reconstruction efforts and reinventing the country's diplomatic standing.

== Background ==
=== Assad government ===
The Arab Socialist Ba'ath Party government came to power through a coup d'état in 1963 by overthrowing the Second Syrian Republic. A second coup in 1966 ousted the old Baathist leadership of Michel Aflaq, replacing it with a militaristic, hard-left, pro-Soviet regime led by Salah Jadid, causing a split between the Syrian branch of Ba'ath, which supported Jadid, and the Iraqi branch, which remained loyal to Aflaq. Jadid was in turn removed in November 1970 by General Hafez al-Assad, an Alawite who declared himself President in March 1971. This marked the beginning of the domination of personality cults centred around the Assad family that pervaded all aspects of Syrian daily life and was accompanied by a systematic suppression of civil and political freedoms, becoming the central feature of state propaganda. Authority in Ba'athist Syria was monopolised by three power-centres: Alawite loyalist clans, the Ba'ath Party and the Syrian Armed Forces. All three united by their allegiance to the Assad family.

The Syrian Regional Branch remained the dominant political authority in what had been a one-party state until the first multi-party election to the People's Council of Syria was held in 2012. On 31 January 1973, Hafez al-Assad implemented a new constitution, leading to a national crisis. The 1973 Constitution entrusted the Arab Socialist Ba'ath Party with the distinctive role as the "leader of the state and society", empowering it to mobilise the civilians for party programmes, issue decrees to ascertain their loyalty and supervise all legal trade unions. Ba'athist ideology was imposed upon children as a compulsory part of school curricula as the Armed Forces became highly monitored by the Party. The constitution removed Islam from being recognised as the state religion and stripped existing provisions such as the requirement that the president of Syria be Muslim. These measures caused widespread furor amongst the public, leading to fierce demonstrations in Hama, Homs and Aleppo organized by the Muslim Brotherhood and the ulama. The Assad regime violently crushed the Islamic revolts that occurred during 1976–1982, waged by revolutionaries from the Syrian Muslim Brotherhood.

The Ba'ath Party carefully constructed Assad as the guiding father figure of the party and modern Syrian nation, advocating the continuation of Assad dynastic rule of Syria. As part of the publicity efforts to brand the nation and Assad family as inseparable, slogans such as "Assad or we burn the country", "Assad or to hell with the country" and "Hafez Assad, forever" became an integral part of the state and party discourse during the 1980s. Eventually the party organisation itself became a rubber stamp and the power structures became deeply dependent on sectarian affiliation to the Assad family and the central role of armed forces needed to crack down on dissent in the society. Critics of the regime have pointed out that deployment of violence is central to the rule of Ba'athist Syria and describe it as "a dictatorship with genocidal tendencies". Hafez al-Assad's nearly three-decade rule was marked by its methods, ranging from censorship to violent measures of state terror such as mass murders, forced deportations and brutal practices such as torture, which were unleashed collectively upon the civilian population. Upon Hafez al-Assad's death in 2000, his son Bashar al-Assad succeeded him as the president of Syria.

Bashar's wife Asma, a Sunni Muslim born and educated in Britain, was initially hailed in the Western press as a "rose in the desert". The couple once raised hopes amongst Syrian intellectuals and outside Western observers, being seen as a path towards implementing economic and political reforms. However, Bashar failed to deliver on promised reforms, instead cracking down on the civil society groups, political reformists and democratic activists that emerged during the Damascus Spring in the 2000s. Bashar Al-Assad claims that no 'moderate opposition' to his government exists, and that all opposition forces are Islamists focused on destroying his secular leadership; his view was that terrorist groups operating in Syria are "linked to the agendas of foreign countries".

=== Demographics ===
The total Syrian population in July 2018 was estimated at 19,454,263 people. By ethnic groups, Syria was approximately Arab 50%, Alawite 15%, Kurd 10%, Levantine 10% and 15% of other ethnic groups (includes Druze, Ismaili, Imami, Assyrian, Turkmen and Armenian). Its religious breakdown was: Muslim 87% (official; includes Sunni 74% and Alawi, Ismaili and Shia 13%), Christian 10% (mainly of Eastern Christian churches—may now be smaller as a result of Christians fleeing the country), Druze 3% and Jewish (uncounted in the estimate, but with few remaining in Damascus and Aleppo).

=== Socioeconomic background ===
Socioeconomic inequality increased significantly after free market policies were initiated by Hafez al-Assad in his later years, and it accelerated after Bashar al-Assad came to power. With an emphasis on the service sector, these policies benefited a minority of the nation's population, mostly people who had connections with the government, and members of the Sunni merchant class of Damascus and Aleppo. In 2010, Syria's nominal GDP per capita was only $2,834, comparable to sub-Saharan African countries such as Nigeria and far lower than its neighbors such as Lebanon, with an annual growth rate of 3.39%, below most other developing countries.

The country also faced particularly high youth unemployment rates. At the start of the war, discontent with the government was strongest in Syria's poor areas, predominantly among conservative Sunnis. These included cities with high poverty rates, such as Daraa and Homs, and the poorer districts of large cities.

=== Drought ===
The unrest coincided with the most intense drought ever recorded in Syria, which lasted from 2006 to 2011 and resulted in widespread crop failure, an increase in food prices and a mass migration of farming families to urban centers. This migration strained infrastructure already burdened by the influx of some 1.5 million refugees from the Iraq War. The drought has also been linked to anthropogenic global warming, with evidence that human-caused climate change influenced the severity and duration of the regional drought. Some analysis, however, has challenged the relative contribution of climatic changes to the conflict, arguing that other factors played a more important role. Adequate water supply continues to be an issue in the ongoing civil war and is frequently the target of military action.

=== Human rights ===
The human rights situation in Syria has long been the subject of harsh critique from global organizations. The rights of free expression, association and assembly were strictly controlled in Syria even before the uprising. The country remained under a state of emergency from 1963 until 2011 and public gatherings of more than five people were banned. Security forces had sweeping powers of arrest and detention. Despite hopes for democratic change with the 2000 Damascus Spring, Bashar al-Assad was widely reported as having failed to implement any improvements. In 2010, he imposed a controversial national ban on female Islamic dress codes (such as face veils) across universities, where reportedly over a thousand primary school teachers that wore the niqab were reassigned to administrative jobs. A Human Rights Watch report issued just before the beginning of the 2011 uprising stated that Assad had failed to substantially improve the state of human rights since taking power.

== History ==
=== Protests, civil uprising, and armed insurgency (2011–2019) ===
In March 2011, popular discontent with President Bashar al-Assad's Ba'athist government led to large-scale protests and pro-democracy rallies across Syria, as part of the wider Arab Spring protests in the region. Numerous protests were violently suppressed by security forces in deadly crackdowns ordered by Assad, resulting in tens of thousands of deaths and detentions, many of whom were civilians. The Syrian revolution transformed into an insurgency with the formation of resistance militias across the country, developing into a full civil war by 2012. (Note: Sources: Kassam, Kamal; Becker, Maria (16 May 2023). "Syrians of today, Germans of tomorrow: the effect of initial placement on the political interest of Syrian refugees in Germany". Frontiers in Political Science. 5 1100446: 3. doi:10.3389/fpos.2023.1100446. ISSN 2673-3145.; "Syria: The story of the conflict". BBC News. 11 March 2016. Archived from the original on 22 June 2018.; "Syrian Troops Open Fire on Protestors in Several Cities". The New York Times. 25 March 2011. Archived from the original on 21 June 2018.; "Mid-East unrest: Syrian protests in Damascus and Aleppo". BBC News. 15 March 2011. Archived from the original on 21 July 2018.)

Escalation; Government clashes with rebels (2012–2013)

Military situation in August 2012.

Military situation in June 2013.

Rise of the Islamist groups (January–August 2014)

Military situation in July 2014.

Territorial changes from September 2014 to September 2015.

US intervention (September 2014 – August 2015)

Russian intervention; first partial ceasefire (September 2015 – August 2016)

Aleppo recaptured; Russian/Iranian/Turkish-backed ceasefire (September 2016 – April 2017)

Territorial changes from September 2015 to December 2016.

Territorial changes from December 2016 to December 2017.

Territorial changes from December 2017 to March 2019.

Territorial changes from April 2019 to March 2020.

Syrian-American conflict; de-escalation zones (April–August 2017)

ISIL siege of Deir ez-Zor broken; CIA program halted; Russian forces permanent (September–December 2017)

Government forces advance in Hama province and Ghouta; Turkish intervention in Afrin (January–March 2018)

Douma chemical attack; US-led missile strikes; southern Syria offensive (April–August 2018)

Idlib demilitarization; Partial US withdrawal; Iraq strikes ISIL targets (September–December 2018)

ISIL attacks continue; US states conditions of withdrawal; fifth inter-rebel conflict (January–April 2019)

New outbreaks of civil war; northwestern offensive; northern buffer zone established (May–August 2019)

US forces withdraw from buffer zone; Turkish offensive into north-eastern Syria (September–December 2019)

In October 2019, Kurdish leaders of the AANES announced they had reached a major deal with the Assad government, allowing for Syrian Army forces to enter Kurdish-held towns along the Syria–Turkey border. The deal was part of an effort to resist Turkey's cross-border incursion into AANES territory after US forces withdrew from the area after the collapse of the Northern Syria Buffer Zone. In November 2019, Russia, Turkey and the Assad government established a new buffer zone in northern Syria that deescalated the Kurdish-Turkish clashes. US-led coalition forces regrouped in eastern Syria in continued support of the SDF against the Islamic State insurgency, amid tensions with local Russian forces and Iranian elements in the region.

By the end of the decade, the war had resulted in an estimated 470,000–610,000 violent deaths, making it the second-deadliest conflict of the 21st century, after the Second Congo War.

=== Stalemate and frozen conflict (2020–2024) ===
Following the March 2020 Idlib ceasefire, frontline fighting between the Syrian government under Assad and opposition groups had mostly subsided. By 2021, the Assad government controlled about two-thirds of the country and was consolidating power. Although, regular flare-ups occurred among factions in northwestern Syria, and large-scale protests emerged in southern Syria and spread nationwide in response to extensive autocratic policies and the economic situation. The protests were noted at the time as resembling the 2011 revolution that preceded the civil war.

The civil war had largely settled into a stalemate by early 2023. The United States Institute of Peace said:

Twelve years into Syria's devastating civil war, the conflict appears to have settled into a frozen state. Although roughly 30% of the country is controlled by opposition forces, heavy fighting has largely ceased and there is a growing regional trend toward normalizing relations with the regime of Bashar al-Assad. Over the last decade, the conflict erupted into one of the most complicated in the world, with a dizzying array of international and regional powers, opposition groups, proxies, local militias and extremist groups all playing a role. The Syrian population has been brutalized, with nearly a half a million killed, 12 million fleeing their homes to find safety elsewhere, and widespread poverty and hunger. Meanwhile, efforts to broker a political settlement have gone nowhere, leaving the Assad regime firmly in power.

The US Council on Foreign Relations said:

The war whose brutality once dominated headlines has settled into an uncomfortable stalemate. Hopes for regime change have largely died out, peace talks have been fruitless, and some regional governments are reconsidering their opposition to engaging with Syrian leader Bashar al-Assad. The government has regained control of most of the country, and Assad's hold on power seems secure.

However, major clashes continued between Turkish forces and factions within Syria. In late 2023, Turkish forces continued to attack Kurdish forces in northern Syria. Starting on 5 October 2023, the Turkish Armed Forces launched a series of air and ground strikes targeting the Syrian Democratic Forces in northeastern Syria (AANES territory). The airstrikes were launched in response to the 2023 Ankara bombing, which the Turkish government alleged was carried out by attackers originating from northeastern Syria.

=== Fall of the Assad regime (2024) ===
Syrian opposition offensives which overthrew Assad's regime in 11 days

Military situation following the fall of the Assad regime and the end of the civil war

On 27 November 2024, a coalition of opposition groups called the Military Operations Command, led by Hay'at Tahrir al-Sham, launched a major offensive against the Syrian Army and other pro-government forces in Aleppo, Idlib, Hama and Homs Governorates. This was followed by other rebel offensives from the Southern Operations Room, the SDF and the Syrian Free Army which all began seizing Syrian government territory in the country's south and east. On 29 November, rebel forces entered Aleppo as Syrian Army positions collapsed across the country. On 7 December, rebel forces entered Damascus and the next day, on 8 December, Bashar al-Assad was reported to have fled the capital. The Syrian Army confirmed Assad was no longer in power and had fled the country, resulting in the collapse of his regime and ending over 60 years of Ba'athist rule under the Assad dynasty. Assad and his family fled to Moscow and were granted asylum in Russia. The fall of Assad has been said to mark the end of the Syrian civil war.

Syrian prime minister Mohammad Ghazi al-Jalali recognized the transfer of power to the Syrian Salvation Government, which established a caretaker government in Damascus with Mohammed al-Bashir serving as the prime minister. Ahmed al-Sharaa, the leader of the Syrian Salvation Government and emir of Hay'at Tahrir al-Sham, became de facto leader of Syria.

== Belligerents ==
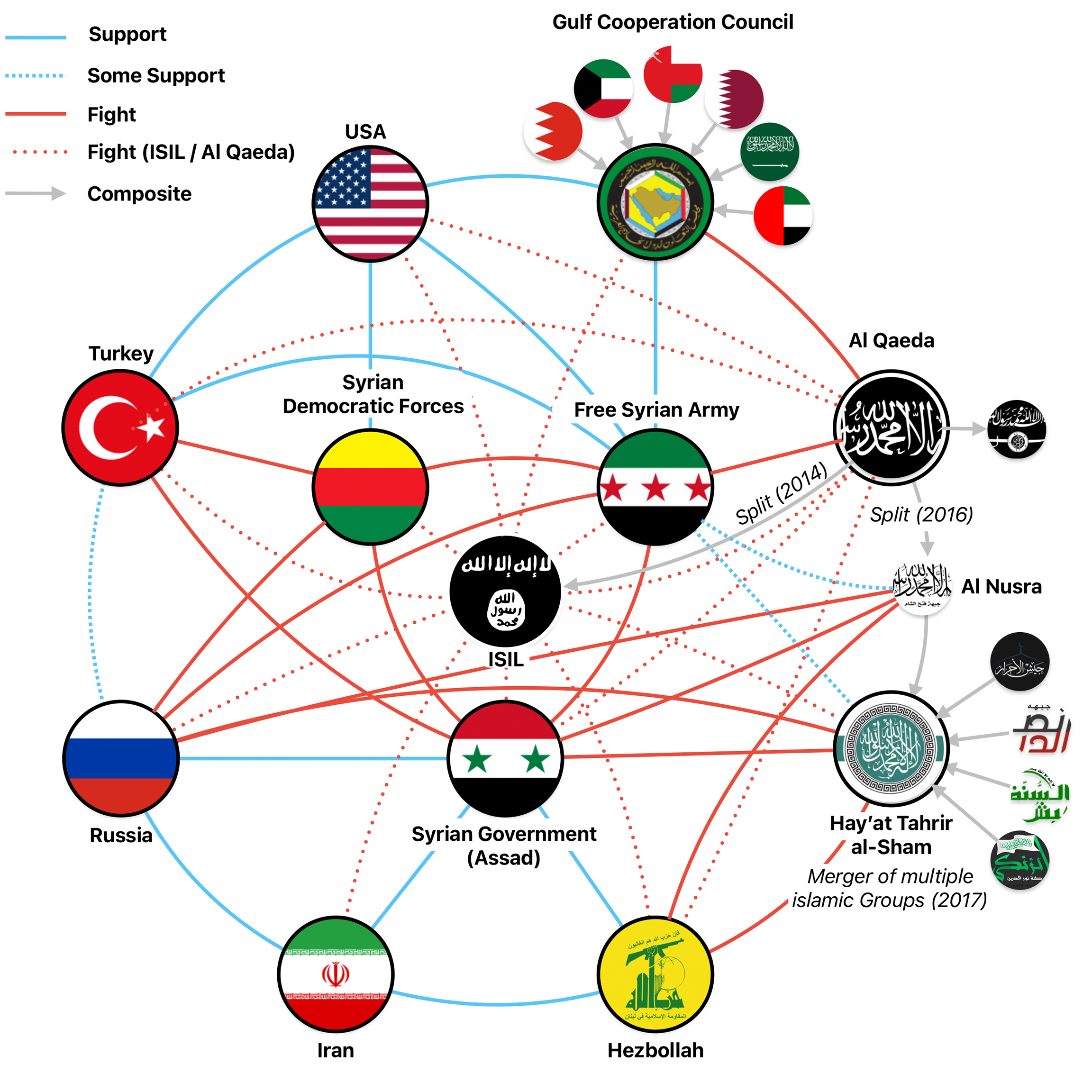
Local, regional and international actors involved in the Syrian civil war prior to the fall of the Assad regime.

=== Syrian factions ===
There are numerous factions, both foreign and domestic, involved in the Syrian civil war. These can be divided into four main groups.

- First, Ba'athist Syria led by Bashar al-Assad and backed by his Russian and Iranian allies.
- Second, the Syrian opposition consisting of two alternative governments:
  - i) the Syrian Interim Government backed by the Syrian National Coalition, a big-tent coalition of democratic, Syrian nationalist and Islamic political groups whose defense forces consist of the Syrian National Army and Free Syrian Army, and
  - ii) the Syrian Salvation Government, a Sunni Islamist coalition led by Hay'at Tahrir al-Sham.
- Third, the Kurdish-dominated Autonomous Administration of North and East Syria and its military wing, the Syrian Democratic Forces, supported by the United States, France and other coalition allies.
- Fourth, the global jihadist camp consisting of al-Qaeda affiliate Guardians of Religion Organisation and its rival Islamic State.

The Syrian government, the opposition and the SDF all received support—militarily, logistically and diplomatically—from foreign countries, leading the conflict to often be described as a proxy war.

=== Foreign involvement ===
Map of states with military/paramilitary forces deployed in Syria. Syria Supported the Assad government with troops Supported the Assad government with militia Supporting Syrian rebels or a non-government faction with troops

The major parties that supported the Assad government were Iran, Russia and Lebanese militia Hezbollah. Syrian rebel groups received political, logistic and military support from the United States, Turkey, Saudi Arabia, Qatar, Britain, France, Israel and the Netherlands. Under the aegis of operation Timber Sycamore and other clandestine activities, CIA operatives and US special operations troops have trained and armed nearly 10,000 rebel fighters at a cost of $1 billion a year since 2012. Iraq had also been involved in supporting the Syrian government, but mostly against ISIL.

Hezbollah, the Lebanese Shia militant group, was significantly involved in the Syrian Civil War. Starting from the 2011 Syrian revolution, Hezbollah provided active support to the Ba'athist government forces. By 2012, the group escalated its involvement, deploying troops across Syria. In 2013, Hezbollah publicly acknowledged its presence in Syria, intensifying its ground commitment. This involvement included an estimated 5,000 to 8,000 fighters at any given time, comprising Special Forces, standing forces from all units, part-time fighters and new recruits with accelerated combat training. Hezbollah's presence, supported by Iranian weaponry and training, further complicated the conflict dynamics, drawing Israeli airstrikes against Hezbollah and Iranian targets in Syria.

=== Spillover ===
In June 2014, members of the Islamic State of Iraq and the Levant (ISIL) crossed the border from Syria into northern Iraq, and took control of large swaths of Iraqi territory as the Iraqi Army abandoned its positions. Fighting between rebels and government forces also spilled over into Lebanon on several occasions. There were repeated incidents of sectarian violence in the North Governorate of Lebanon between supporters and opponents of the Syrian government, as well as armed clashes between Sunnis and Alawites in Tripoli.

Starting on 5 June 2014, ISIL seized swathes of territory in Iraq. As of 2014, the Syrian Arab Air Force used airstrikes targeted against ISIL in Raqqa and al-Hasakah in coordination with the Iraqi government.

== Weaponry and warfare ==
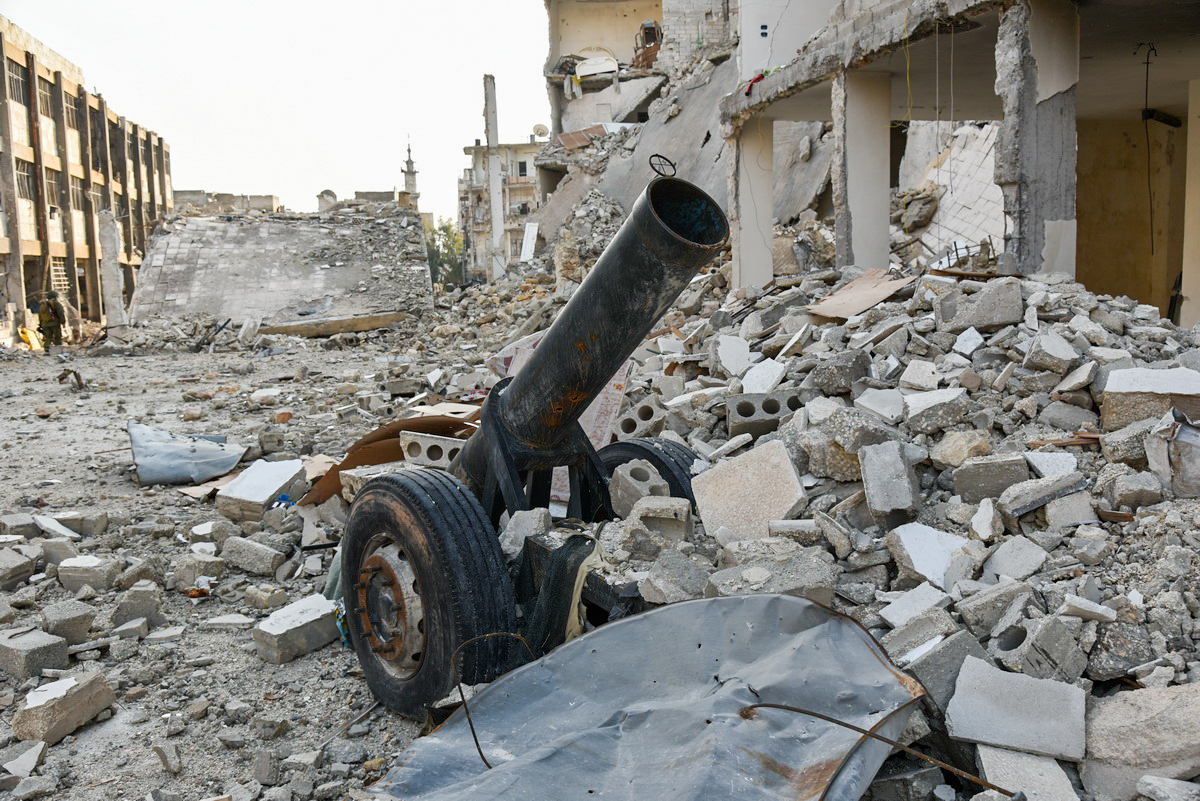
'Hell cannon' Improvised artillery found after the battle of Aleppo in 2016

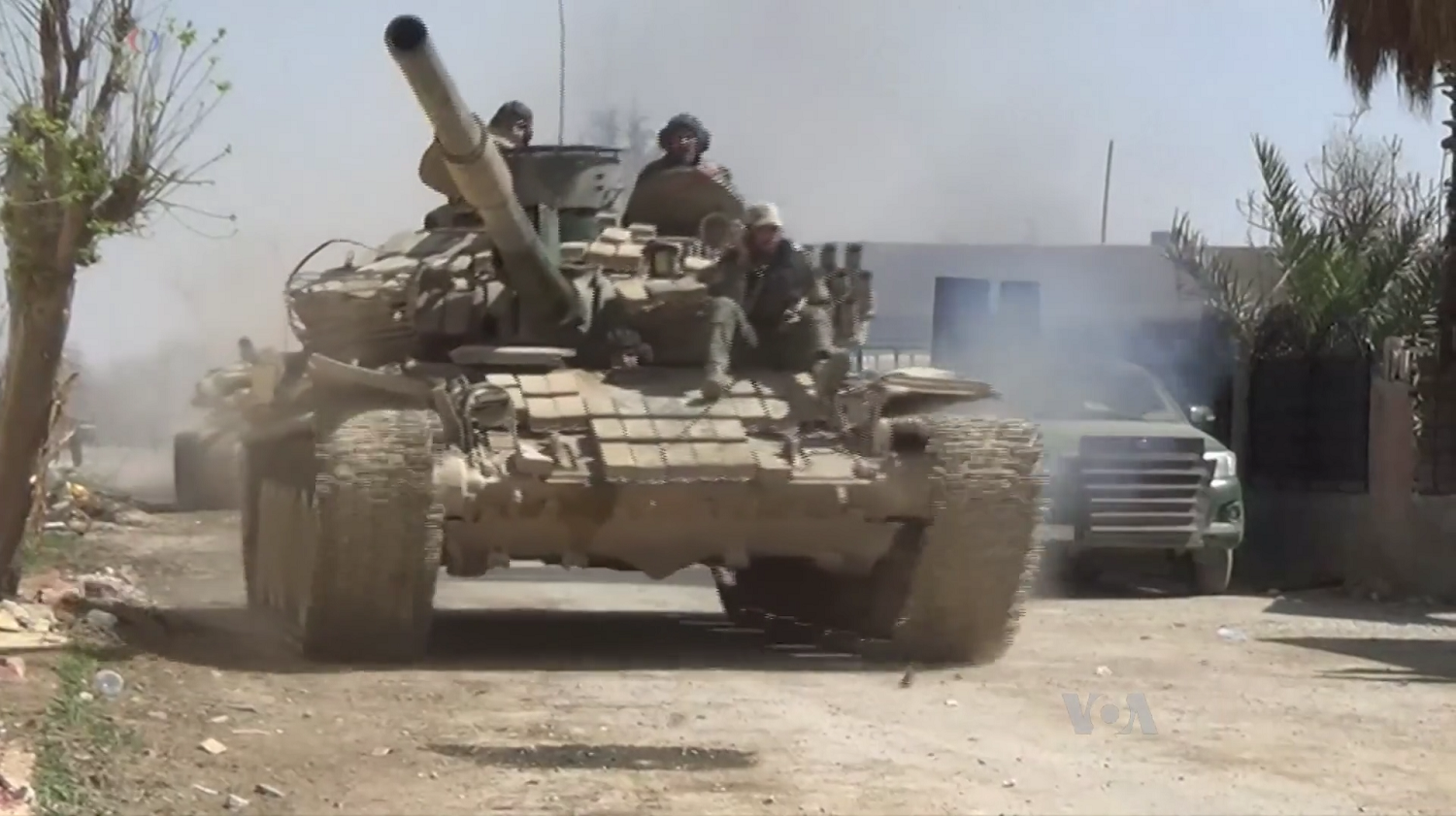
Syrian Army T-72 tank during the 2018 Rif Dimashq offensive

=== Chemical weapons ===
Sarin, mustard agent and chlorine gas have been used during the conflict. Numerous casualties led to an international reaction, especially the 2013 Ghouta chemical attack. The attack was the deadliest use of chemical weapons since the Iran–Iraq War. A UN fact-finding mission was requested to investigate reported chemical weapons attacks. In four cases, UN inspectors confirmed the use of sarin gas. In August 2016, a confidential report by the UN and the OPCW explicitly blamed the Syrian military of Bashar al-Assad for dropping chemical weapons (chlorine bombs) on the towns of Talmenes in April 2014 and Sarmin in March 2015 and ISIL for using sulfur mustard on the town of Marea in August 2015.

The United States and the European Union have said the Syrian government has conducted several chemical attacks. Following the 2013 Ghouta attacks and international pressure, the destruction of Syria's chemical weapons began. In 2015 the UN mission disclosed previously undeclared traces of sarin compounds at a "military research site". After the April 2017 Khan Shaykhun chemical attack, the United States launched its first intentional attack against Syrian government forces. An investigation conducted by Tobias Schneider and Theresa Lutkefend of the GPPi research institute documented 336 confirmed attacks involving chemical weapons in Syria between 23 December 2012 and 18 January 2019. The study attributed 98% of the total chemical attacks to the Assad regime. Almost 90% of the attacks occurred after Ghouta chemical attack in August 2013.

In April 2020, the UN Security Council briefing was held on the findings of a global chemical weapons watchdog, Organisation for the Prohibition of Chemical Weapons (OPCW), which found that the Syrian Air Force used sarin and chlorine during multiple attacks in 2017. Syria's close allies, Russia, and other European countries debated the issue, during which Moscow dismissed the OPCW findings while many Western European countries called for accountability for the government's war crimes. The UN Deputy ambassador from Britain, Jonathan Allen, stated that the report by the OPCW's Investigation Identification Team (IIT) claimed that the Syrian regime is responsible for using chemical weapons in the war on at least four occasions. The information was also noted in two UN-mandated investigations.

In April 2021, Syria was suspended from the OPCW through the public vote of member states for not cooperating with the IIT and for violating the Chemical Weapons Convention. Findings of another OPCW investigation report published in July 2021 concluded that the Syrian regime had engaged in confirmed chemical attacks at least 17 times, out of the 77 reported incidents of chemical weapons usage attributed to Assadist forces.

=== Cluster bombs ===
Syria is not a party to the Convention on Cluster Munitions and does not recognize the ban on the use of cluster bombs. The Syrian Army is reported to have begun using cluster bombs in September 2012. Steve Goose, director of the Arms Division at Human Rights Watch, said "Syria is expanding its relentless use of cluster munitions, a banned weapon, and civilians are paying the price with their lives and limbs." He adds of the weapons that "The initial toll is only the beginning because cluster munitions often leave unexploded bomblets that kill and maim long afterward."

=== Thermobaric weapons ===
Russian thermobaric weapons, also known as "fuel-air bombs", were used by the government's side during the war. On 2 December 2015, The National Interest reported that Russia was deploying the TOS-1 Buratino multiple rocket launch system to Syria, which is "designed to launch massive thermobaric charges against infantry in confined spaces such as urban areas". One Buratino thermobaric rocket launcher "can obliterate a roughly 200 by 400 metres (660 by 1,310 feet) area with a single salvo". Since 2012, rebels have said that the Syrian Air Force (government forces) is using thermobaric weapons against residential areas occupied by the rebel fighters, such as during the Battle of Aleppo and also in Kafr Batna. A panel of United Nations human rights investigators reported that the Syrian government used thermobaric bombs against the strategic town of Qusayr in March 2013. In August 2013, the BBC reported on the use of napalm-like incendiary bombs on a school in northern Syria.

=== Missiles ===
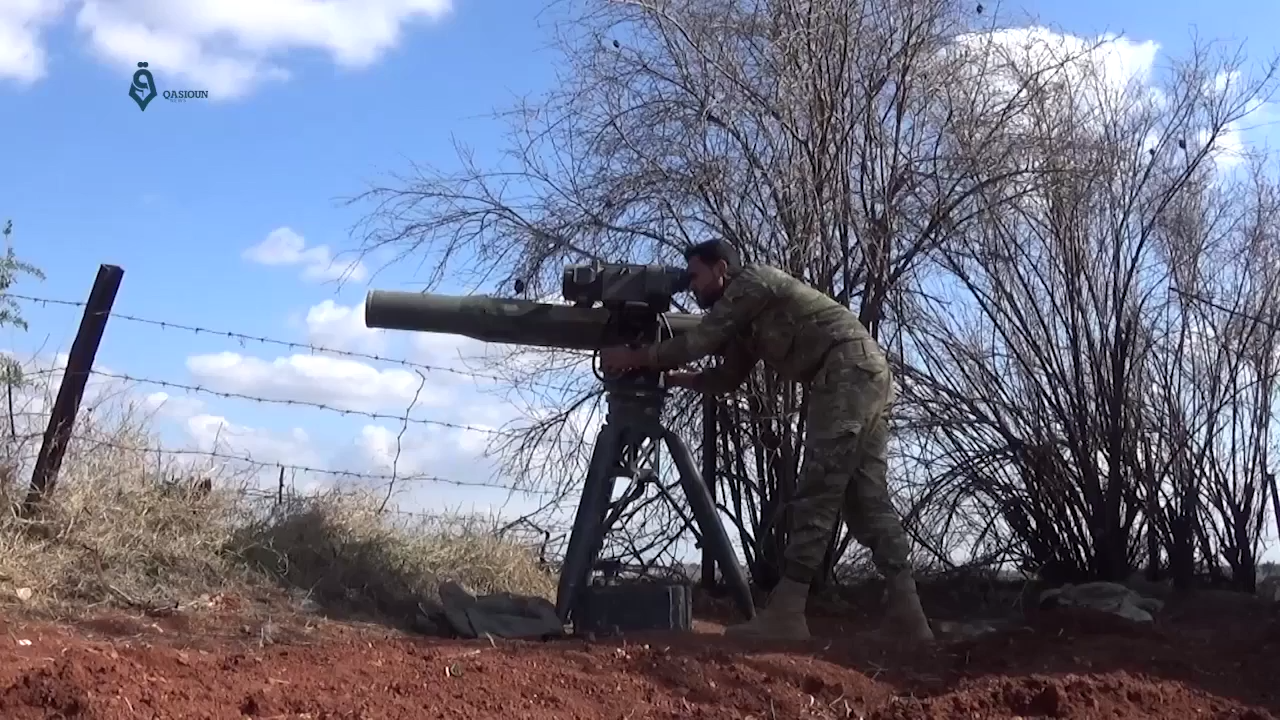
An Army of Glory fighter launches a BGM-71 TOW anti-tank missile at a Syrian government position during the 2017 Hama offensive.

Several types of anti-tank missiles are in use in Syria. Russia has sent 9M133 Kornet, third-generation anti-tank guided missiles to the Syrian government whose forces have used them extensively against armour and other ground targets to fight jihadists and rebels. US-made BGM-71 TOW missiles are one of the primary weapons of rebel groups and have been primarily provided by the United States and Saudi Arabia. The US has also supplied many Eastern European sourced 9K111 Fagot launchers and warheads to Syrian rebel groups under its Timber Sycamore program.

In June 2017, Iran attacked ISIL targets in the Deir ez-Zor area in eastern Syria with Zolfaghar ballistic missiles fired from western Iran, in the first use of mid-range missiles by Iran in 30 years. According to Jane's Defence Weekly, the missiles travelled 650–700 kilometres.

== Sectarianism ==
Map of Syria's ethno-religious composition in 1976

The successive governments of Hafez and Bashar al-Assad have been closely associated with the country's minority Alawite religious group, an offshoot of Shia, whereas the majority of the population, and most of the opposition, is Sunni. This resulted in calls for persecution of the Alawites by parts of the opposition.

A third of 250,000 Alawite men of military age have been killed fighting in the Syrian civil war. In May 2013, SOHR stated that out of 94,000 killed during the war, 41,000 of which being Alawites.

As militias and non-Syrian Shia—motivated by pro-Shia sentiment rather than loyalty to the Assad government—have taken over fighting the anti-government forces from the weakened Syrian Army, fighting has taken on a more sectarian nature. One opposition leader has said that the Shia militias often "try to occupy and control the religious symbols in the Sunni community to achieve not just a territorial victory but a sectarian one as well"—reportedly occupying mosques and replacing Sunni icons with pictures of Shia leaders. According to the Syrian Network for Human Rights, human rights abuses have been committed by the militias including "a series of sectarian massacres between March 2011 and January 2014 that left 962 civilians dead".

In 2025 after the defeat of Assad and the rise of the transitional government, a series of mass killings and massacres against Alawites occurred in Syria, largely in March 2025. The UK-based Syrian Observatory for Human Rights (SOHR) reported that 1,614 civilians were killed by armed militias supporting the Syrian government. The observatory estimated actual numbers to be much higher.

== Kurdish autonomy in northeastern Syria ==
The Autonomous Administration of North and East Syria (AANES), also known as Rojava, (Note: The name "Rojava" ("The West") was initially used by the region's PYD-led government, before its usage was dropped in 2016. Since then, the name is still used by some locals and international observers.) is a de facto autonomous region in northeastern Syria. The region does not claim to pursue full independence but autonomy within a federal and democratic Syria. Rojava consists of self-governing sub-regions in the areas of Afrin, Jazira, Euphrates, Raqqa, Tabqa, Manbij and Deir Ez-Zor. The region gained its de facto autonomy in 2012 in the context of the ongoing Rojava conflict, in which its official military force, the Syrian Democratic Forces (SDF), has taken part.

While entertaining some foreign relations, the region is not officially recognized as autonomous by the government of Syria or any state except for the Catalan Parliament. The AANES has widespread support for its universal democratic, sustainable, autonomous pluralist, equal and feminist policies in dialogues with other political parties and organizations. Northeastern Syria is polyethnic and home to sizeable ethnic Kurdish, Arab and Assyrian populations, with smaller communities of ethnic Turkmen, Armenians, Circassians and Yazidis.

The supporters of the region's administration state that it is an officially secular polity with direct democratic ambitions based on an anarchistic, feminist and libertarian socialist ideology promoting decentralization, gender equality, environmental sustainability, social ecology and pluralistic tolerance for religious, cultural and political diversity, and that these values are mirrored in its constitution, society and politics, stating it to be a model for a federalized Syria as a whole, rather than outright independence. The region's administration has also been accused by some partisan and nonpartisan sources of authoritarianism, support of the Syrian government, Kurdification and displacement. However, despite this the AANES has been the most democratic system in Syria, with direct open elections, universal equality, respecting human rights within the region, as well as defense of minority and religious rights within Syria.

In March 2015, the Syrian Information Minister announced that his government considered recognizing Kurdish autonomy "within the law and constitution". While the region's administration was not invited to the Geneva III peace talks on Syria, or any of the earlier talks, Russia in particular called for the region's inclusion and did to some degree carry the region's positions into the talks, as documented in Russia's May 2016 draft for a new constitution for Syria.

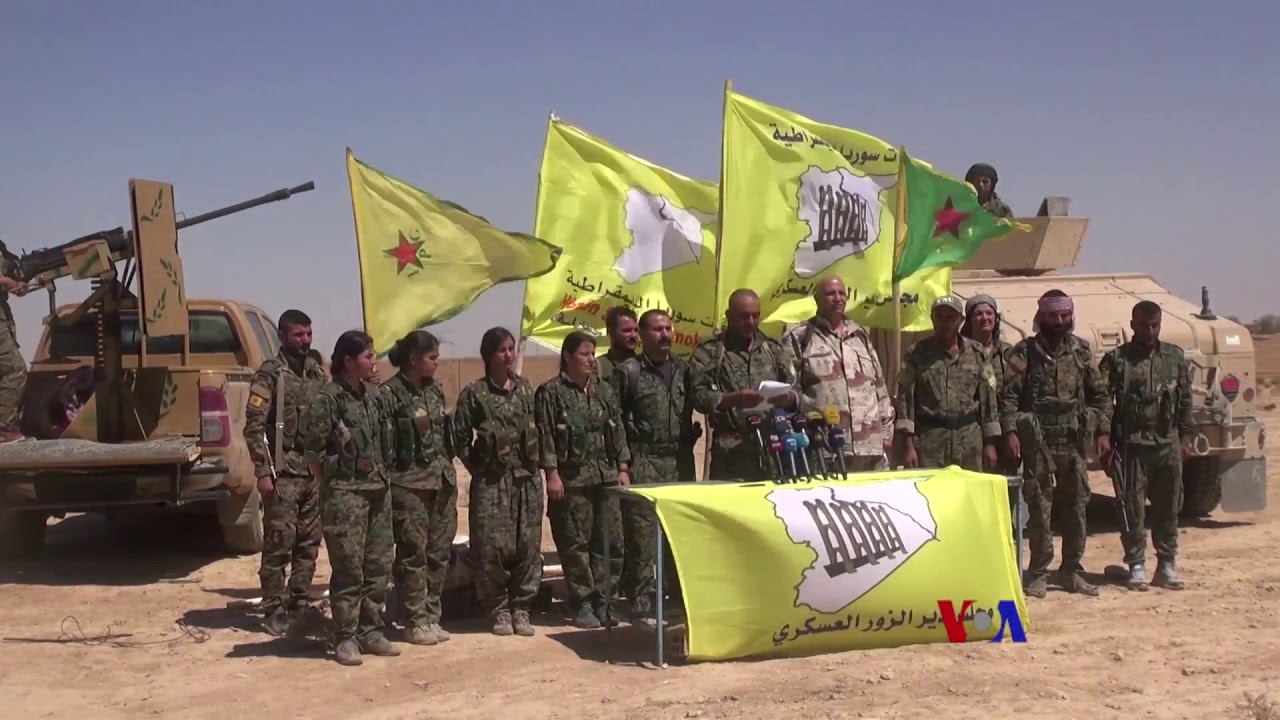
The Kurdish-led Syrian Democratic Forces announcing the Deir ez-Zor campaign in 2017

An analysis released in June 2017 described the region's "relationship with the government fraught but functional" and a "semi-cooperative dynamic". In late September 2017, Syria's foreign minister said that Damascus would consider granting Kurds more autonomy in the region once ISIL was defeated.

On 13 October 2019, the SDF announced that it had reached an agreement with the Syrian Army which allowed the latter to enter the SDF-held cities of Manbij and Kobani in order to dissuade a Turkish attack on those cities as part of the cross-border offensive by Turkish and Turkish-backed Syrian rebels. The Syrian Army also deployed in the north of Syria together with the SDF along the Syrian-Turkish border and entered into several SDF-held cities such as Ayn Issa and Tell Tamer. Following the creation of the Second Northern Syria Buffer Zone, the SDF stated that it was ready to work cooperatively with the Syrian Army if a political settlement between the Syrian government and the SDF was achieved.

As of 2022, the main military threat and conflict faced by Rojava's official defense force, the Syrian Democratic Forces (SDF), are firstly, an ongoing conflict with ISIS; and secondly, ongoing concerns of possible invasion of the northeast regions of Syria by Turkish forces, in order to strike Kurdish groups in general, and Rojava in particular. An official report by the Rojava government noted Turkey-backed militias as the main threat to the region of Rojava and its government.

On 5 June 2022, the leader of the SDF, Mazloum Abdi, said that forces of the Kurdish government in the AANES were willing to work with Syrian government forces to defend against Turkey, saying "Damascus should use its air defense systems against Turkish planes." Abdi said that Kurdish groups would be able to cooperate with the Syrian government, and still retain their autonomy. The joint discussions were a result of the negotiation processes that had begun in October 2019. In early 2023, reports indicated that the forces of Islamic State in Syria had mostly been defeated, with only a few cells remaining in various remote locations.

As of 2023, Turkey was continuing its support for various militias within Syria, consisting mostly of the Syrian National Army, which periodically attempted some operations against Kurdish groups. One stated goal was to create "safe zones" along Turkey's border with Syria, according to a statement by Turkish president Erdoğan. The operations were generally aimed at the Tal Rifaat and Manbij regions west of the Euphrates and other areas further east. President Erdoğan openly stated his support for the operations, in talks with Moscow in mid-2022.

== Humanitarian impact ==
Human toll of the Syrian civil war
- Pre-war population 22 ±.5; Internally displaced 6 ±.5, Refugees 5.5 ±.5, Fatalities 0.5 ±.1 (millions)

Syrian refugees
- By country: Turkey, Lebanon, Egypt, Jordan
- Settlements: Camps: Jordan

Internally displaced Syrians

Casualties of the war
- Crimes: War crimes, massacres, rape

=== Refugees ===
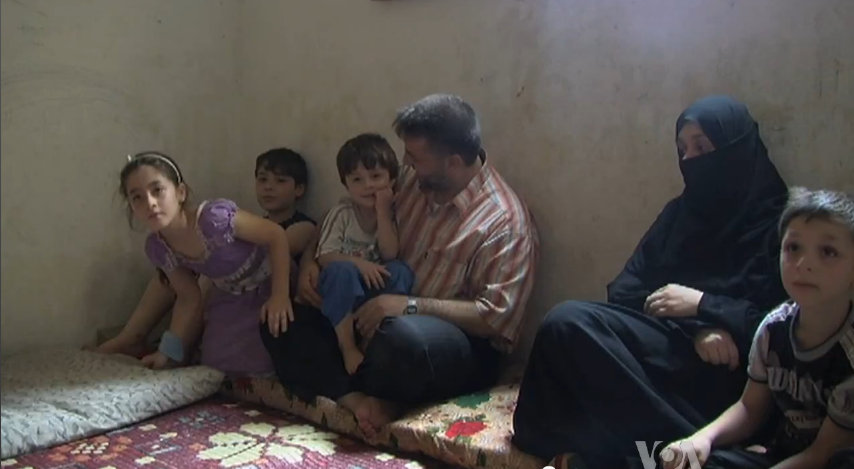
Syrian refugees in Lebanon living in cramped quarters (6 August 2012)

As of December 2022, an estimated 6.7 million refugees have been forced to flee Syria, with approximately 5.5 million Syrian refugees residing across the five nearby countries of Turkey, Lebanon, Jordan, Iraq and Egypt. Germany hosts the largest refugee population out of any non-neighboring nation with more than 850,000 Syrian refugees.

Over 3.7 million Syrian refugees are in Turkey. Many refugees are housed in a system of a dozen Syrian refugee camps placed under the direct authority of the Turkish Government. Satellite images confirmed that the first Syrian camps appeared in Turkey in July 2011, shortly after the towns of Deraa, Homs and Hama were besieged. The massive sustained presence of Syrian refugees has fueled resentment from Turkish citizens and figures across the country's political spectrum. They have been employed as scapegoats during periods of crisis within the country. Measures have been put in place to "drive them out" including raised fees on utilities such as water and services such as marriage licences. There has been an increase on attacks targeting Syrian refugees in the country.

In 2013, one in three of Syrian refugees (about 667,000 people) sought safety in Lebanon, which had a population of 5.2 million in 2012.

In September 2014, the UN stated that the number of Syrian refugees had exceeded three million. According to the Jerusalem Center for Public Affairs, Sunnis are leaving for Lebanon and undermining Hezbollah's status. The Syrian refugee crisis has caused the "Jordan is Palestine" threat to be diminished due to the onslaught of new refugees in Jordan. Greek Catholic Patriarch Gregorios III Laham claimed in 2014 that more than 450,000 Syrian Christians have been displaced by the conflict. As of September 2016, the European Union has reported that there are 13.5 million refugees in need of assistance in the country. As of 2024, it is estimated that around 1,000 European citizens are still in the Syrian internally displaced persons camps, located almost exclusively in Al-Hawl, of whom more than 600 are children.

A report from NGO ACT Alliance found that refugees in camps in north-eastern Syria have tripled in 2019. Numerous refugees remain in local refugee camps. Conditions there are reported to be severe, especially during the winter. In 2019, 4,000 people were housed at the Washokani Camp. The Kurdish Red Cross was the only organization known to have helped the camp's refugees. Numerous camp residents called for assistance from international groups.

=== Internally displaced refugees ===
The violence in Syria caused millions to flee their homes. As of March 2015, Al-Jazeera estimated 10.9 million Syrians, or almost half the population, have been displaced. Violence in the ongoing crisis in northwest Syria had forced 6,500 children to flee every day over the last week of January 2020. The recorded count of displaced children in the area has reached more than 300,000 since December 2019.

As of 2022, there are 6.2 million internally displaced persons in Syria according to the United Nations High Commissioner for Refugees. 2.5 million of those are children. 2017 alone saw the displacement of at least 1.8 million people, many of them being displaced for the second and third time.

=== Casualties ===
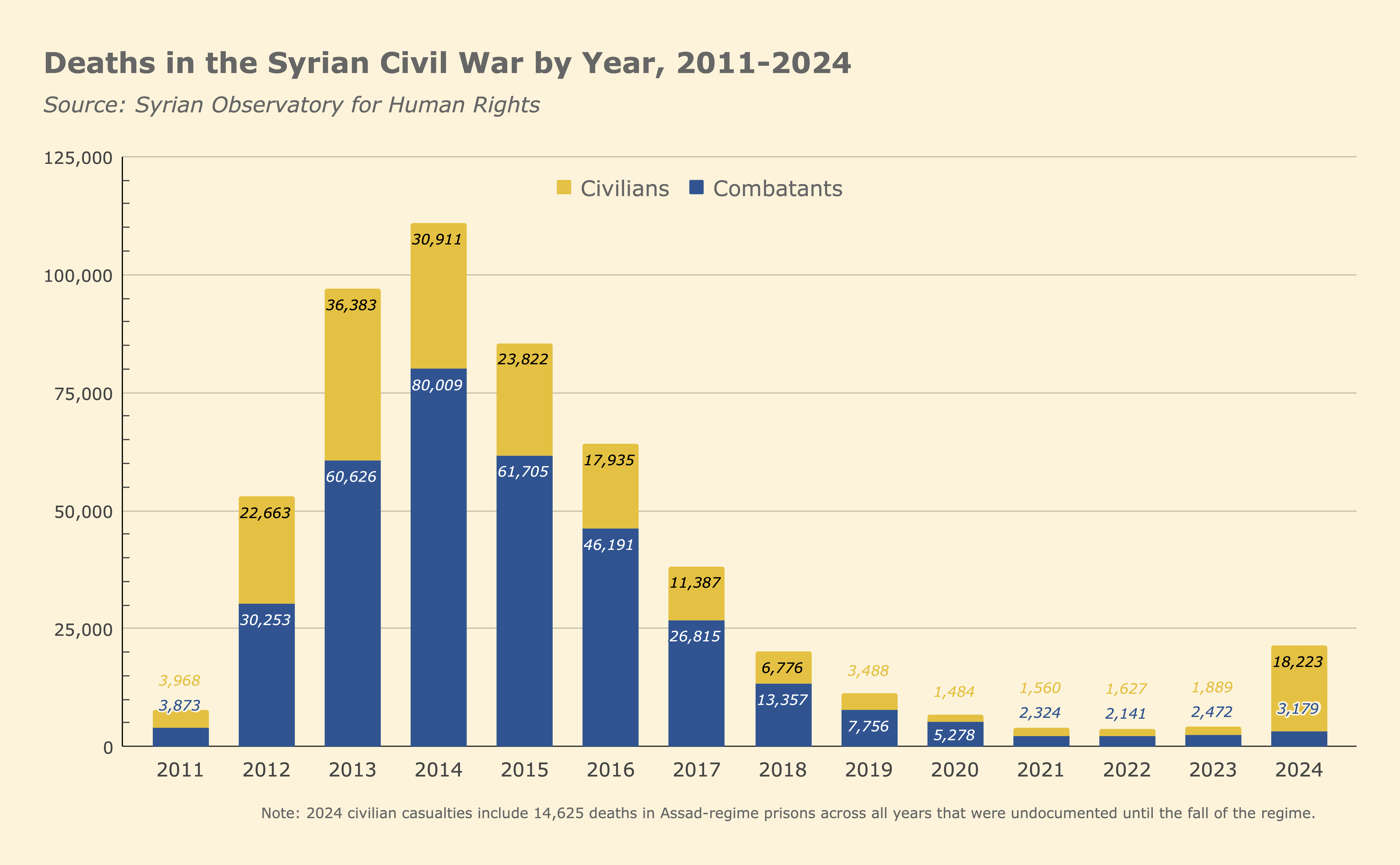
Annual deaths 2011 to 2024

Estimates of the total number of deaths in the Syrian Civil War were approximately 656,493 as of March 2025. In late September 2021, the United Nations stated it had documented the deaths of at least 350,209 "identified individuals" in the conflict between March 2011 and March 2021, but cautioned the figure was "certainly an under-count" that specified only a "minimum verifiable number".

The most violent year of the conflict was 2014, when around 110,000 people were killed. In April 2016, UN envoy to Syria Staffan de Mistura stated that more than 400,000 people were killed in the Syrian civil war. By mid-March 2025, opposition activist group the Syrian Observatory for Human Rights (SOHR) reported the number of children killed in the conflict had risen to 26,282, and that 16,181 women had also been killed.

On 28 June 2022, the United Nations Human Rights Office (OHCHR) stated that at least 306,887 civilians had been killed in Syria during the conflict between March 2011 and March 2021, representing about 1.5% of the country's pre-war population. This figure did not include indirect and non-civilian deaths. UN's Commission of Inquiry on the Syrian Arab Republic estimated that between 2011 and May 2021, more than 580,000 people were killed; with 13 million Syrians being displaced and 6.7 million refugees forced to flee Syria. Ba'athist government forces reportedly arrested and tortured numerous repatriated refugees, subjecting them to forced disappearances and extrajudicial executions.

In 2015, the UNHCR designated the conflict as the "world's worst humanitarian crisis", while the head of the UNHRC's Commission of Inquiry on Syria stated that the Ba'athist government was responsible for the majority of civilian casualties up to that point. The Syrian Network for Human Rights estimated that between 2011 and 2024, the Ba'athist government and its foreign allies were responsible for approximately 91% of the total civilian casualties.

=== Human rights violations and war crimes ===
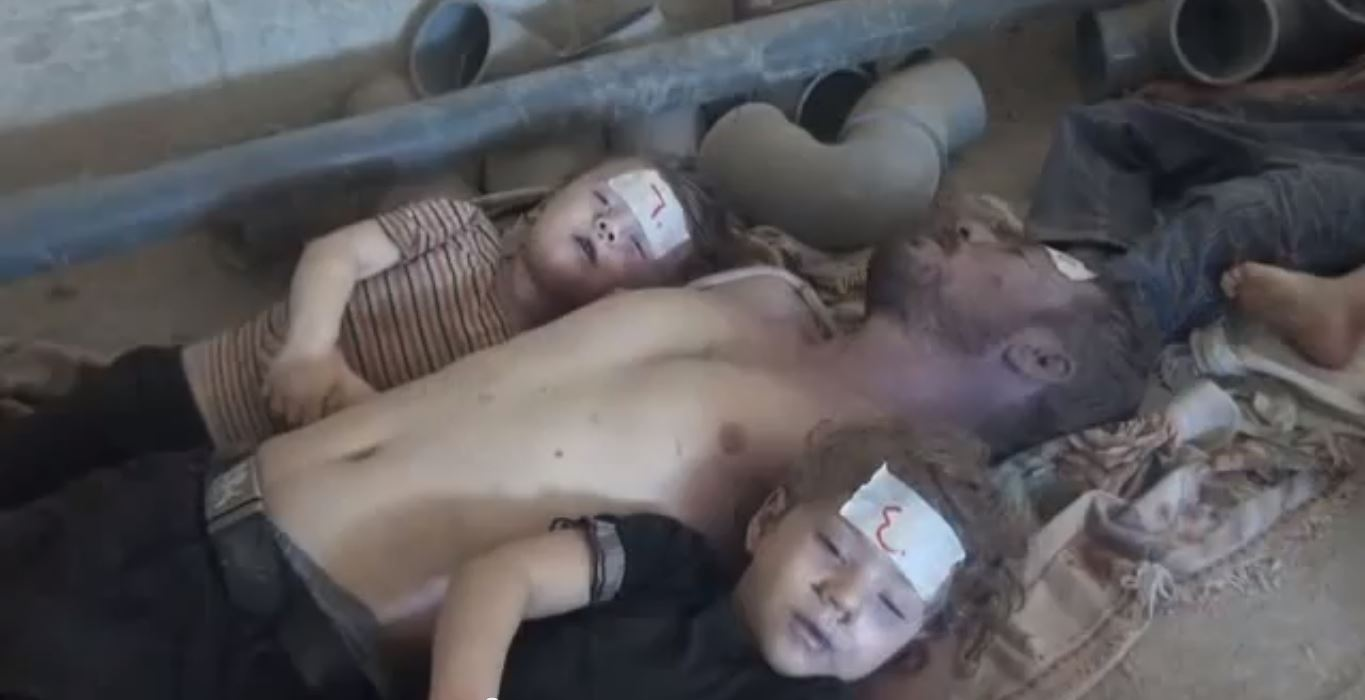
Victims of the Ghouta chemical attack perpetrated by Syrian regime forces in August 2013

United Nations and human rights organizations have documented that human rights violations have been committed by both the government and the rebel forces, with the "vast majority of the abuses having been committed by the Syrian government".

Numerous human rights abuses, political repression, war crimes and crimes against humanity perpetrated by the Assad government throughout the course of the conflict led to international condemnation and widespread calls to convict Bashar al-Assad in European courts and in the International Criminal Court (ICC). (Note: Sources:)

According to three international lawyers, Syrian government officials could face war crimes charges in the light of a huge cache of evidence smuggled out of the country showing the "systematic killing" of about 11,000 detainees. Most of the victims were young men and many corpses were emaciated, bloodstained and bore signs of torture. Some had no eyes; others showed signs of strangulation or electrocution. Experts said this evidence was more detailed and on a far larger scale than anything else that had emerged from the then 34-month crisis. Atrocities committed by the Assad regime have been described as the "greatest war crimes of the 21st century", with chilling revelations of torture, rapes, massacres and extermination being leaked through the 2014 Caesar Report, which contained photographic evidence gathered by a dissident army photographer who worked in Ba'athist military prisons. According to international lawyer Stephen Rapp:

We've got better evidence—against Assad and his clique—than we had against Milosevic in Yugoslavia, or we had in any of the war crimes tribunals in which I've involved in, some extent, even better than we had against the Nazis at Nuremberg, because the Nazis didn't actually take individual pictures of each of their victims with identifying information on them.

The UN reported in 2014 that "siege warfare is employed in a context of egregious human rights and international humanitarian law violations. The warring parties do not fear being held accountable for their acts". Armed forces of both sides of the conflict blocked access to humanitarian convoys, confiscated food, cut off water supplies and targeted farmers working their fields. The report pointed to four places besieged by the government forces: Muadamiyah, Daraya, Yarmouk camp and Old City of Homs, as well as two areas under siege of rebel groups: Aleppo and Hama. In Yarmouk Camp 20,000 residents faced death by starvation due to blockade by the Syrian government forces and fighting between the army and Jabhat al-Nusra, which prevents food distribution by UNRWA. In July 2015, the UN removed Yarmouk from its list of besieged areas in Syria, despite not having been able deliver aid there for four months, and declined to say why it had done so. After intense fighting in April/May 2018, Syrian government forces finally took the camp, its population now reduced to 100–200.

ISIS forces have also been criticized by the UN of using public executions and killing of captives, amputations and lashings in a campaign to instill fear. "Forces of the Islamic State of Iraq and al-Sham have committed torture, murder, acts tantamount to enforced disappearance and forced displacement as part of attacks on the civilian population in Aleppo and Raqqa governorates, amounting to crimes against humanity", said the report from 27 August 2014. ISIS also persecuted gay and bisexual men.

Enforced disappearances and arbitrary detentions have also been a feature since the Syrian uprising began. An Amnesty International report, published in November 2015, stated the Syrian government has forcibly disappeared more than 65,000 people since the beginning of the Syrian civil war. According to a report in May 2016 by the Syrian Observatory for Human Rights, at least 60,000 people have been killed since March 2011 through torture or from poor humanitarian conditions in Syrian government prisons.

In February 2017, Amnesty International published a report which stated the Syrian government murdered an estimated 13,000 persons, mostly civilians, at the Saydnaya military prison. They stated the killings began in 2011 and were still ongoing. Amnesty International described this as a "policy of deliberate extermination" and also stated that "These practices, which amount to war crimes and crimes against humanity, are authorised at the highest levels of the Syrian government". Three months later, the United States State Department stated a crematorium had been identified near the prison. According to the US, it was being used to burn thousands of bodies of those killed by the government's forces and to cover up evidence of atrocities and war crimes. Amnesty International expressed surprise at the reports about the crematorium, as the photographs used by the US are from 2013 and they did not see them as conclusive, and fugitive government officials have stated that the government buries those its executes in cemeteries on military grounds in Damascus. The Syrian government said the reports were not true.

By July 2012, the human rights group Women Under Siege had documented over 100 cases of rape and sexual assault during the conflict, with many of these crimes reported to have been perpetrated by the Shabiha and other pro-government militias. Victims included men, women and children, with about 80% of the known victims being women and girls.

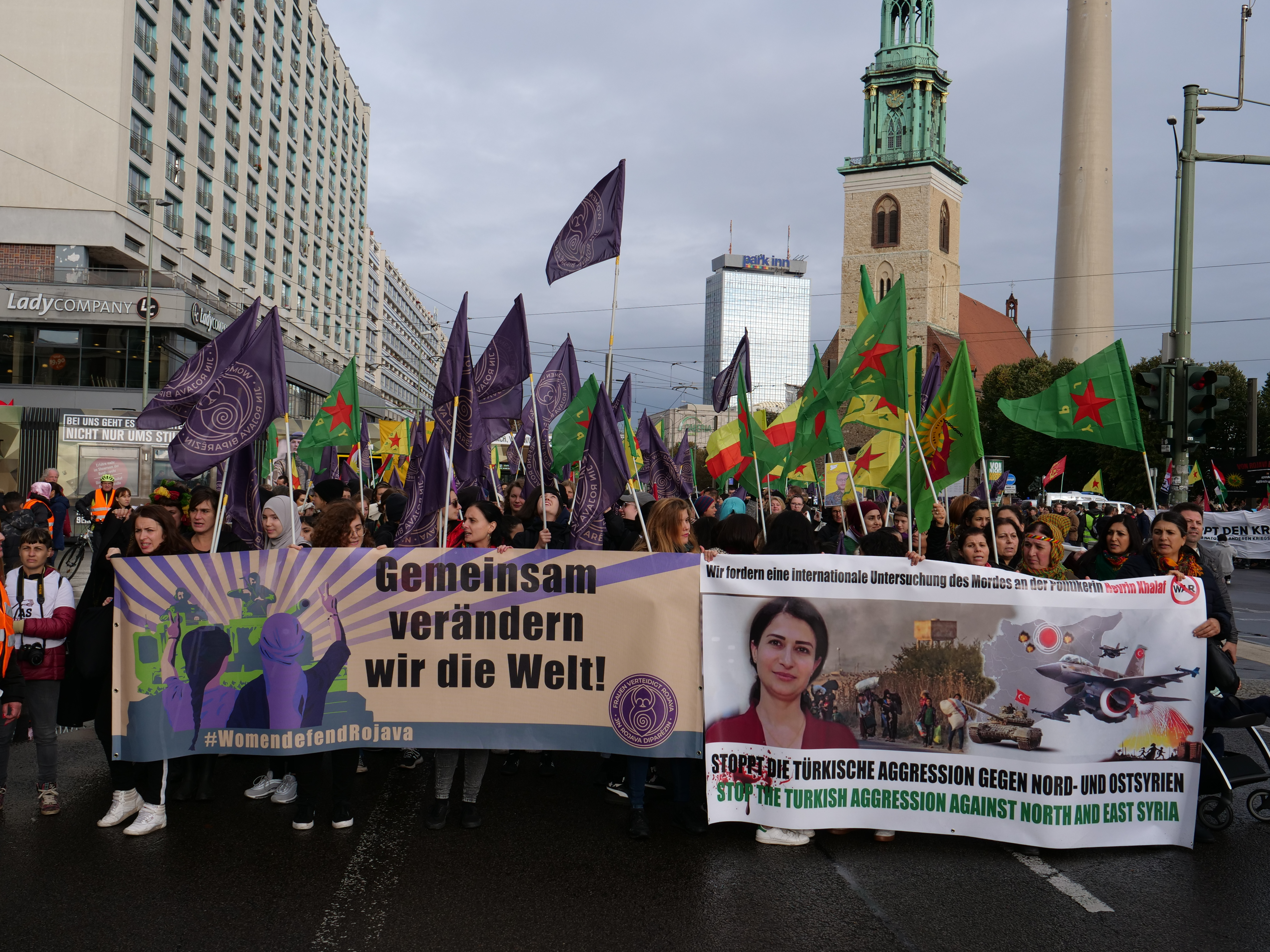
Protest in Berlin, showing image of murdered Syrian-Kurdish politician Hevrin Khalaf

In late 2019, as the violence intensified in northwest Syria, thousands of women and children were reportedly kept under "inhumane conditions" in a remote camp, said UN-appointed investigators. In October 2019, Amnesty International stated that it had gathered evidence of war crimes and other violations committed by Turkish and Turkey-backed Syrian forces who are said to "have displayed a shameful disregard for civilian life, carrying out serious violations and war crimes, including summary killings and unlawful attacks that have killed and injured civilians".

According to a 2020 report by UN-backed investigators into the Syrian civil war, young girls aged nine and above have been raped and inveigled into sexual slavery, while boys have been put through torture and forcefully trained to execute killings in public. Children have been attacked by sharpshooters and lured to be bargaining chips for ransoms.

On 6 April 2020, the United Nations published its investigation into the attacks on humanitarian sites in Syria. In its reports, the UN said it had examined six sites of attacks and concluded that the airstrikes had been carried out by the "Government of Syria and/or its allies." However, the report was criticized for being partial towards Russia and not naming it, despite proper evidence. "The refusal to explicitly name Russia as a responsible party working alongside the Syrian government ... is deeply disappointing", the HRW quoted.

=== Crime wave ===
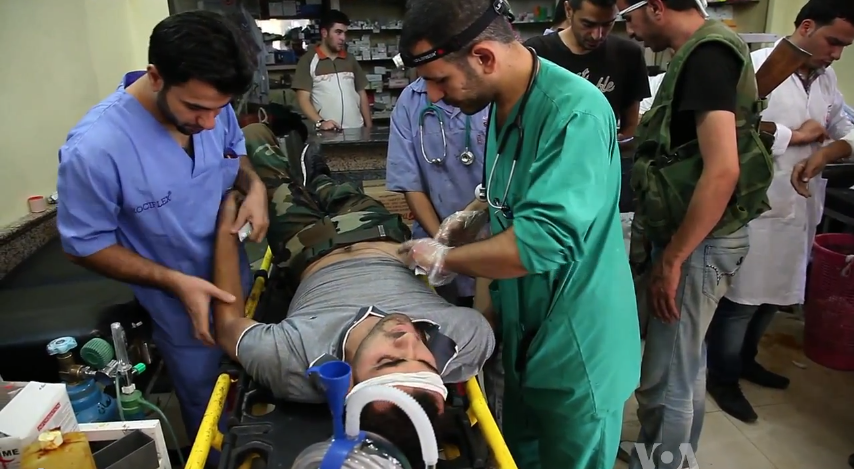
Doctors and medical staff treating injured rebel fighters and civilians in Aleppo

As the conflict expanded across Syria, cities were engulfed in a wave of crime as fighting caused the disintegration of much of the civilian state, and many police stations stopped functioning. Rates of theft increased, with criminals looting houses and stores. Rates of kidnappings increased as well. Rebel fighters were seen stealing cars and, in one instance, destroying a restaurant in Aleppo where Syrian soldiers had been seen eating.

Local National Defense Forces commanders often engaged "in war profiteering through protection rackets, looting and organized crime". NDF members were also implicated in "waves of murders, robberies, thefts, kidnappings and extortions throughout government-held parts of Syria since the formation of the organization in 2013", as reported by the Institute for the Study of War.

Criminal networks were used by both the government and the opposition during the conflict. Facing international sanctions, the Syrian government relied on criminal organizations to smuggle goods and money in and out of the country. The economic downturn caused by the conflict and sanctions also led to lower wages for Shabiha members. In response, some Shabiha members began stealing civilian properties and engaging in kidnappings. Rebel forces sometimes relied on criminal networks to obtain weapons and supplies. Black market weapon prices in Syria's neighboring countries significantly increased since the start of the conflict. To generate funds to purchase arms, some rebel groups turned towards extortion, theft and kidnapping. Syria became the chief location for manufacturing Captagon, an illegal amphetamine. Drugs manufactured in Syria found their way across the Gulf, Jordan and Europe but were at times intercepted.

=== Epidemics ===
The World Health Organization has reported that 35% of the country's hospitals are out of service. Fighting makes it impossible to undertake the normal vaccination programs. The displaced refugees may also pose a disease risk to countries to which they have fled. Four hundred thousand civilians were isolated by the Siege of Eastern Ghouta from April 2013 to April 2018, resulting in acutely malnourished children according to the United Nations Special Advisor, Jan Egeland, who urged the parties for medical evacuations. 55,000 civilians are also isolated in the Rukban refugee camp between Syria and Jordan, where humanitarian relief access is difficult due to the harsh desert conditions. Humanitarian aid reaches the camp only sporadically, sometimes taking three months between shipments.

Formerly rare infectious diseases have spread in rebel-held areas brought on by poor sanitation and deteriorating living conditions. The diseases have primarily affected children. These include measles, typhoid, hepatitis, dysentery, tuberculosis, diphtheria, whooping cough and the disfiguring skin disease leishmaniasis. Of particular concern is the contagious and crippling poliomyelitis. As of late 2013 doctors and international public health agencies have reported more than 90 cases. Critics of the government complain that, even before the uprising, it contributed to the spread of disease by purposefully restricting access to vaccination, sanitation and access to hygienic water in "areas considered politically unsympathetic".

In June 2020, the United Nations reported that after more than nine years of war, Syria was falling into an even deeper crisis and economic deterioration as a result of the COVID-19 pandemic. As of 26 June, a total of 248 people were infected by COVID-19, out of which nine people died. Restrictions on the importation of medical supplies, limited access to essential equipment, reduced outside support and ongoing attacks on medical facilities left Syria's health infrastructure in peril, and unable to meet the needs of its population. Syrian communities were additionally facing unprecedented levels of hunger crisis.

In September 2022, the UN representative in Syria reported that several regions in the country were witnessing a cholera outbreak. UN Resident and Humanitarian Coordinator Imran Riza called for an urgent response to contain the outbreak, saying that it posed "a serious threat to people in Syria". The outbreak was linked to the use of contaminated water for growing crops and the reliance of people on unsafe water sources.

=== Humanitarian aid ===
U.S. aid to Syrian opposition forces, May 2013

The conflict holds the record for the largest sum ever requested by UN agencies for a single humanitarian emergency, $6.5 billion worth of requests of December 2013. The international humanitarian response to the conflict in Syria is coordinated by the United Nations Office for the Coordination of Humanitarian Affairs (UNOCHA) in accordance with General Assembly Resolution 46/182. The primary framework for this coordination is the Syria Humanitarian Assistance Response Plan (SHARP) which appealed for US$1.41 billion to meet the humanitarian needs of Syrians affected by the conflict. Official United Nations data on the humanitarian situation and response is available at an official website managed by UNOCHA Syria (Amman). UNICEF is also working alongside these organizations to provide vaccinations and care packages to those in need. Financial information on the response to the SHARP and assistance to refugees and for cross-border operations can be found on UNOCHA's Financial Tracking Service. As of 19 September 2015, the top ten donors to Syria were United States, European Commission, United Kingdom, Kuwait, Germany, Saudi Arabia, Canada, Japan, UAE and Norway.

The difficulty of delivering humanitarian aid to people is indicated by the statistics for January 2015: of the estimated 212,000 people during that month who were besieged by government or opposition forces, 304 were reached with food. USAID and other government agencies in US delivered nearly $385 million of aid items to Syria in 2012 and 2013. The United States has provided food aid, medical supplies, emergency and basic health care, shelter materials, clean water, hygiene education and supplies, and other relief supplies. Islamic Relief has stocked 30 hospitals and sent hundreds of thousands of medical and food parcels.

Other countries in the region have also contributed various levels of aid. Iran has been exporting between 500 and 800 tonnes of flour daily to Syria. Israel supplied aid through Operation Good Neighbor, providing medical treatment to 750 Syrians in a field hospital located in Golan Heights where rebels say that 250 of their fighters were treated. Israel established two medical centers inside Syria. Israel also delivered heating fuel, diesel fuel, seven electric generators, water pipes, educational materials, flour for bakeries, baby food, diapers, shoes and clothing. Syrian refugees in Lebanon make up one quarter of Lebanon's population, mostly consisting of women and children. In addition, Russia has said it created six humanitarian aid centers within Syria to support 3000 refugees in 2016.

On 30 April 2020, Human Rights Watch condemned the Syrian authorities for their longstanding restriction on the entry of aid supplies. It also demanded the World Health Organization to keep pushing the UN to allow medical aid and other essentials to reach Syria via the Iraq border crossing, to prevent the spread of COVID-19 in the war-torn nation. The aid supplies, if allowed, will allow the Syrian population to protect themselves from contracting the COVID-19 virus.

== Cultural impact ==
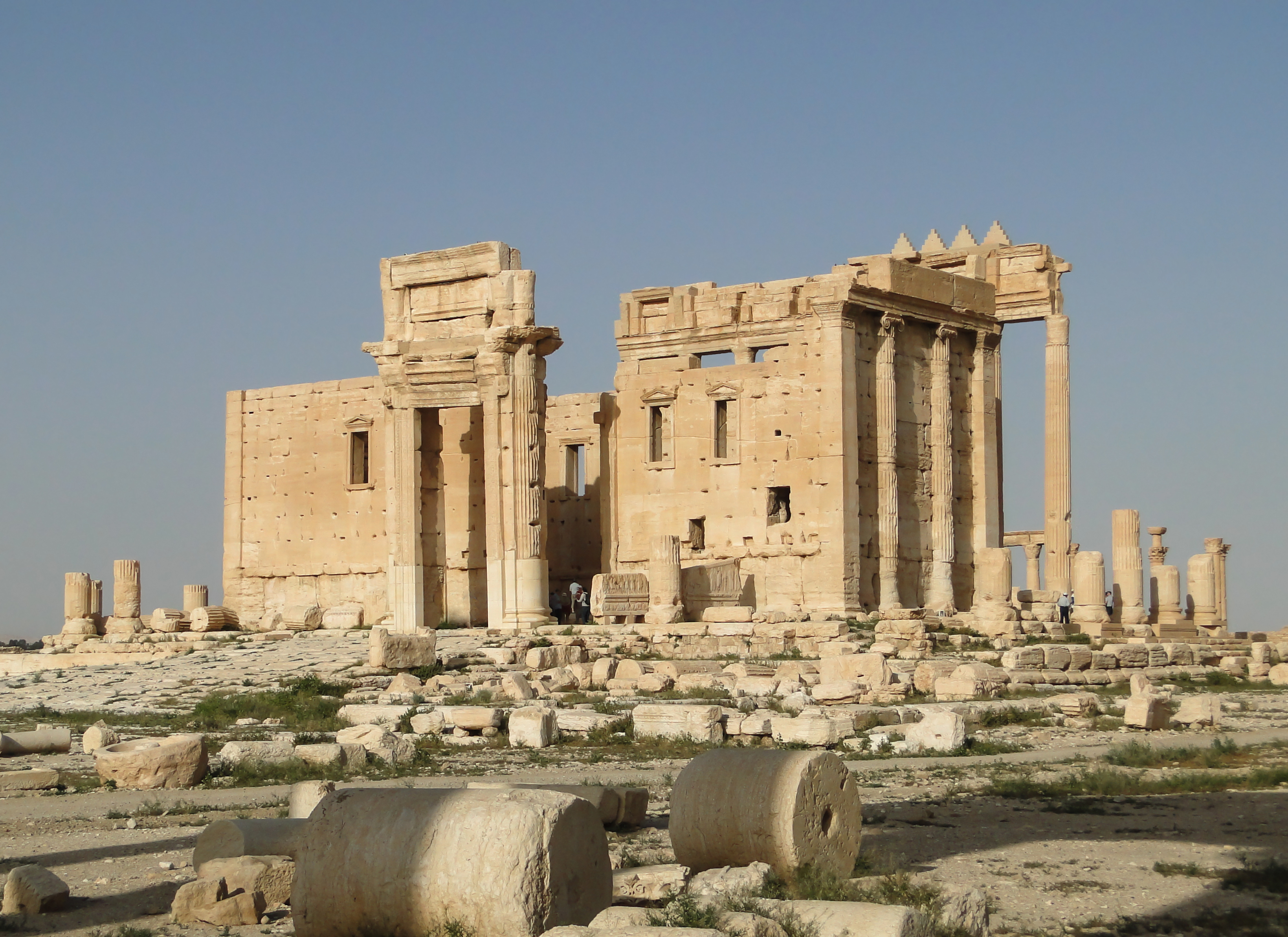
The Temple of Bel in Palmyra, which was destroyed by ISIL in August 2015

As of March 2015, the war has affected 290 heritage sites, severely damaged 104, and completely destroyed 24. Five of the six UNESCO World Heritage Sites in Syria have been damaged. Destruction of antiquities has been caused by shelling, army entrenchment, and looting at various tells, museums and monuments. A group called Syrian Archaeological Heritage Under Threat is monitoring and recording the destruction in an attempt to create a list of heritage sites damaged during the war and to gain global support for the protection and preservation of Syrian archaeology and architecture.

UNESCO listed all six Syria's World Heritage Sites as endangered but direct assessment of damage is not possible. It is known that the Old City of Aleppo was heavily damaged during battles being fought within the district, while Palmyra and Krak des Chevaliers suffered minor damage. Illegal digging is said to be a grave danger, and hundreds of Syrian antiquities, including some from Palmyra, appeared in Lebanon. Three archeological museums are known to have been looted; in Raqqa some artifacts seem to have been destroyed by foreign Islamists due to religious objections.

In 2014 and 2015, following the rise of the Islamic State, several sites in Syria were destroyed by the group as part of a deliberate destruction of cultural heritage sites. In Palmyra, the group destroyed many ancient statues, the Temples of Baalshamin and Bel, many tombs including the Tower of Elahbel and part of the Monumental Arch. The 13th-century Palmyra Castle was extensively damaged by retreating militants during the Palmyra offensive in March 2016. IS also destroyed ancient statues in Raqqa, and a number of churches, including the Armenian Genocide Memorial Church in Deir ez-Zor. In January 2018 Turkish airstrikes seriously damaged an ancient Neo-Hittite temple in Syria's Kurdish-held Afrin region. It was built by the Arameans in the first millennium BC. According to a September 2019 report published by the Syrian Network for Human Rights, more than 120 Christian churches have been destroyed or damaged in Syria since 2011.

The war has inspired its own particular artwork, done by Syrians. A late summer 2013 exhibition in London at the P21 Gallery showed some of this work, which had to be smuggled out of Syria. As a result of the war many children's books have been published surrounding themes and stories of Syrian children of war. Some examples of this would be Tomorrow by Nadine Kaadan, My Beautiful Birds by Suzanne del Rizzo and Nowhere Boy by Katherine Marsh.

== Media coverage ==
The Syrian civil war is one of the most heavily documented wars in history, despite the extreme dangers that journalists face while in Syria.

=== ISIL executions ===
On 19 August 2014, American journalist James Foley was executed by ISIL, who said it was in retaliation for the United States operations in Iraq. Foley was kidnapped in Syria in November 2012 by Shabiha militia. ISIL also threatened to execute Steven Sotloff, who was kidnapped at the Syrian–Turkish border in August 2013. There were reports ISIS captured a Japanese national, two Italian nationals, and a Danish national as well. Sotloff was later executed in September 2014. At least 70 journalists have been killed covering the Syrian war, and more than 80 kidnapped, according to the Committee to Protect Journalists. On 22 August 2014, the al-Nusra Front released a video of captured Lebanese soldiers and demanded Hezbollah withdraw from Syria under threat of their execution.

== International reactions and diplomacy ==
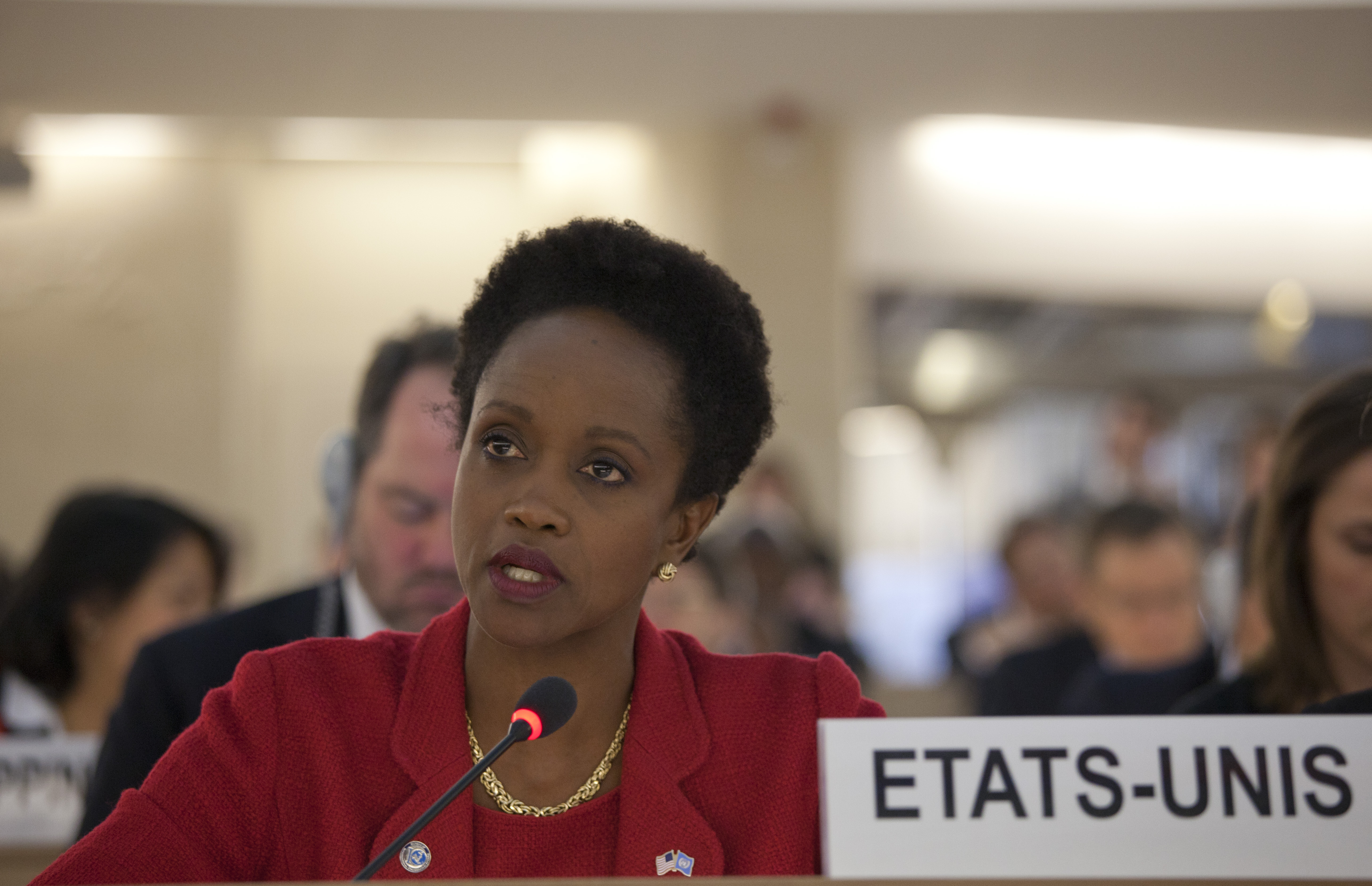
Esther Brimmer (U.S.) speaks at a United Nations Human Rights Council urgent debate on Syria, February 2012

During the early period of the civil war, the Arab League, European Union, the United Nations and many Western governments quickly condemned the Syrian government's violent response to the protests, and expressed support for the protesters' right to exercise free speech. Initially, many Middle Eastern governments expressed support for Assad, but as the death toll mounted, they switched to a more balanced approach by criticizing violence from both government and protesters. Both the Arab League and the Organisation of Islamic Cooperation suspended Syria's membership. Russia and China vetoed Western-drafted United Nations Security Council resolutions in 2011 and 2012, which would have threatened the Syrian government with targeted sanctions if it continued military actions against protestors.

=== Economic sanctions ===
The US Congress has enacted punitive sanctions on the Syrian government for its actions during the Civil War. These sanctions would penalize any entities lending support to the Syrian government, and any companies operating in Syria. US president Donald Trump tried to protect the Turkish president Erdogan from the effects of such sanctions.

Some activists welcomed this legislation. Some critics contend that these punitive sanctions are likely to backfire or have unintended consequences; they argue that ordinary Syrian people will have fewer economic resources due to these sanctions (and will thus need to rely more the Syrian government and its economic allies and projects), while the sanctions' impact on ruling political elites will be limited.

Mohammad al-Abdallah, executive director of Syria Justice and Accountability Center (SJAC), said that the sanctions will likely hurt ordinary Syrian people, saying, "it is an almost unsolvable unfeasible equation. If they are imposed, they will indirectly harm the Syrian people, and if they are lifted, they will indirectly revive the Syrian regime;" he attributed the sanctions to "political considerations, as the United States does not have weapons and tools in the Syrian file, and sanctions are its only means."

In June, US Secretary of State Mike Pompeo announced new economic sanctions on Syria targeting foreign business relations with the Syrian government. Under the Caesar Act, the latest sanctions were to be imposed on 39 individuals and entities, including Asma al-Assad, wife of Syrian president Bashar al-Assad.

On 17 June 2020, James F. Jeffrey, Special Representative for Syria Engagement, signalled that the UAE could be hit with sanctions under the Caesar Act if it pushed ahead with normalisation efforts with the Syrian regime.

=== 2019 negotiations ===
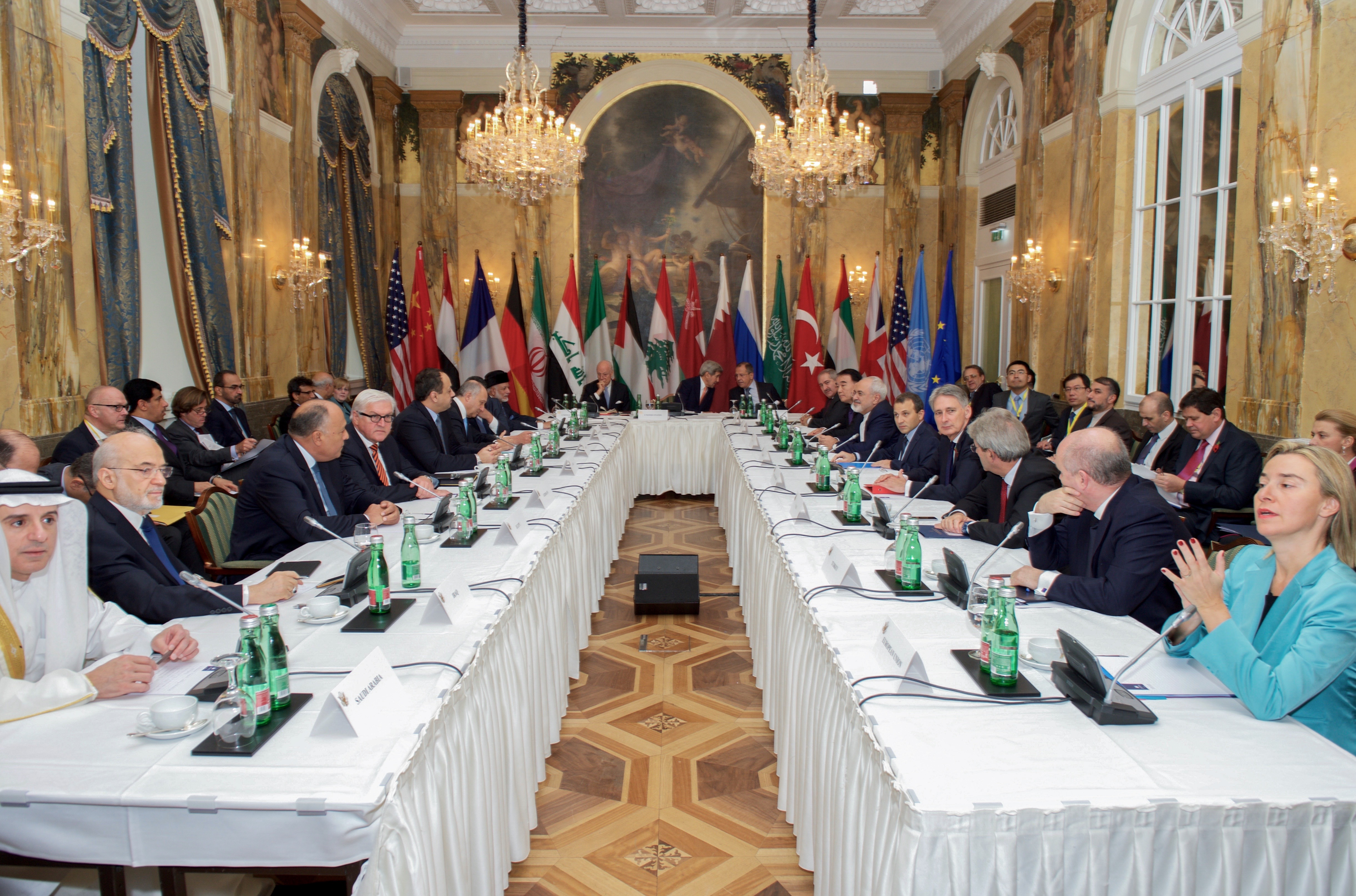
Syria peace talks in Vienna, 30 October 2015

During the course of the war, there have been several international peace initiatives, undertaken by the Arab League, the United Nations and other actors. The Syrian government has refused efforts to negotiate with what it describes as armed terrorist groups. On 1 February 2016, the UN announced the formal start of the UN-mediated Geneva Syria peace talks that had been agreed on by the International Syria Support Group (ISSG) in Vienna. On 3 February 2016, the UN Syria peace mediator suspended the talks. On 14 March 2016, Geneva peace talks resumed. The Syrian government stated that discussion of Bashar-al-Assad's presidency "is a red line", however Syria's president Bashar al-Assad said he hoped peace talks in Geneva would lead to concrete results, and stressed the need for a political process in Syria.

A new round of talks between the Syrian government and some groups of Syrian rebels concluded on 24 January 2017 in Astana, Kazakhstan, with Russia, Iran and Turkey supporting the ceasefire agreement brokered in late December 2016. The Astana Process talks was billed by a Russian official as a complement to, rather than replacement, of the United Nations-led Geneva Process talks. On 4 May 2017, at the fourth round of the Astana talks, representatives of Russia, Iran and Turkey signed a memorandum whereby four "de-escalation zones" in Syria would be established, effective of 6 May 2017.

=== Buffer zone with Turkey ===
In October 2019, in response to the Turkish offensive, Russia arranged for negotiations between the Syrian government and the Kurdish-led forces. Russia also negotiated a renewal of a cease-fire between Kurds and Turkey that was about to expire.

Russia and Turkey agreed via the Sochi Agreement of 2019 to set up a Second Northern Syria Buffer Zone. Syrian president Assad expressed full support for the deal, as various terms of the agreement also applied to the Syrian government. The SDF stated that they considered themselves as "Syrian and a part of Syria", adding that they would agree to work with the Syrian Government. The SDF officially announced their support for the deal on 27 October.

The agreement reportedly included the following terms:

- A buffer zone would be established in northern Syria. The zone would be around 30 kilometres (19 mi) deep, (Note: Starting from the Syria–Turkey border and going south into Syria) stretching from Euphrates River to Tall Abyad and from Ras al-Ayn to the Iraq-Syria border, but excluding the town of Qamishli, the Kurds' de facto capital.
- The buffer zone would be controlled jointly by the Syrian Army and Russian Military Police.
- All YPG forces, which constitute the majority of the SDF, must withdraw from the buffer zone entirely, along with their weapons, within 150 hours from the announcement of the deal. Their withdrawal would be overseen by Russian Military Police and the Syrian Border Guards, which would then enter the zone.

=== Syrian Constitutional Committee ===
In late 2019, a new Syrian Constitutional Committee began operating in order to discuss a new settlement and to draft a new constitution for Syria. This committee comprises about 150 members. It includes representatives of the Syrian government, opposition groups and countries serving as guarantors of the process, such as Russia. However, this committee has faced strong opposition from the Assad government. Fifty of the committee members represent the government, and 50 members represent the opposition.

In December 2019, the EU held an international conference which condemned any suppression of the Kurds, and called for the self-declared Autonomous Administration in Rojava to be preserved and to be reflected in any new Syrian Constitution. The Kurds are concerned that the independence of their declared Autonomous Administration of North and East Syria (AANES) in Rojava might be severely curtailed.

Rojava officials condemned the fact that they were excluded from the peace talks and stated that "having a couple of Kurds" in the committee did not mean that the Syrian Kurds were properly represented in it. The co-chair of the Syrian Democratic Council accused Turkey of vetoing the representation of Syrian Kurds within the committee. The Kurdish administration also organized demonstrations in front of the UN office in Qamishli to protest their exclusion from the committee.

=== Arab League ===
On 13 April 2023, Syrian foreign minister Faisal Mekdad arrived in Jeddah to meet Saudi foreign minister, Prince Faisal bin Farhan. After frayed relations during the Syrian civil war, both nations now seek "a political solution to the Syrian crisis that preserves the unity, security and stability of Syria", according to the Saudi foreign ministry. The high level talks are "facilitating the return of Syrian refugees to their homeland, and securing humanitarian access to the affected areas in Syria". Al-Assad previously visited the UAE, Oman as well as Saudi Arabia. The discussion also included the possible resumption of consular services between the two countries. This is the first visit to Saudi Arabia by a Syrian foreign minister since the onset of the civil war in 2011. The same week all foreign ministers of the Arab League would meet again to discuss the return of Syria to the regional organisation.

== Scale of destruction ==
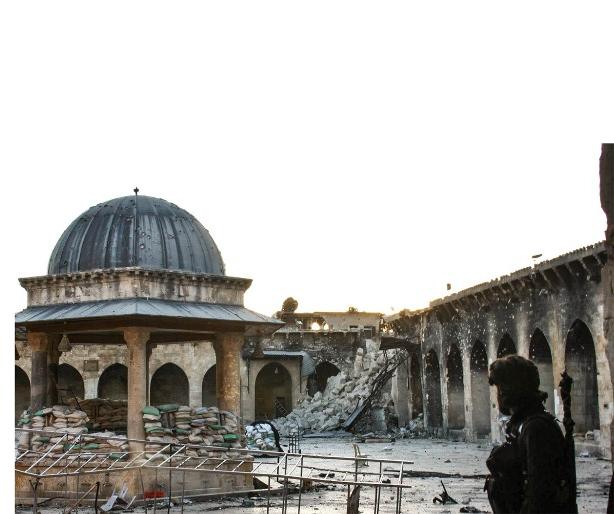
Great Mosque of Aleppo in 2013, after destruction of the minaret.

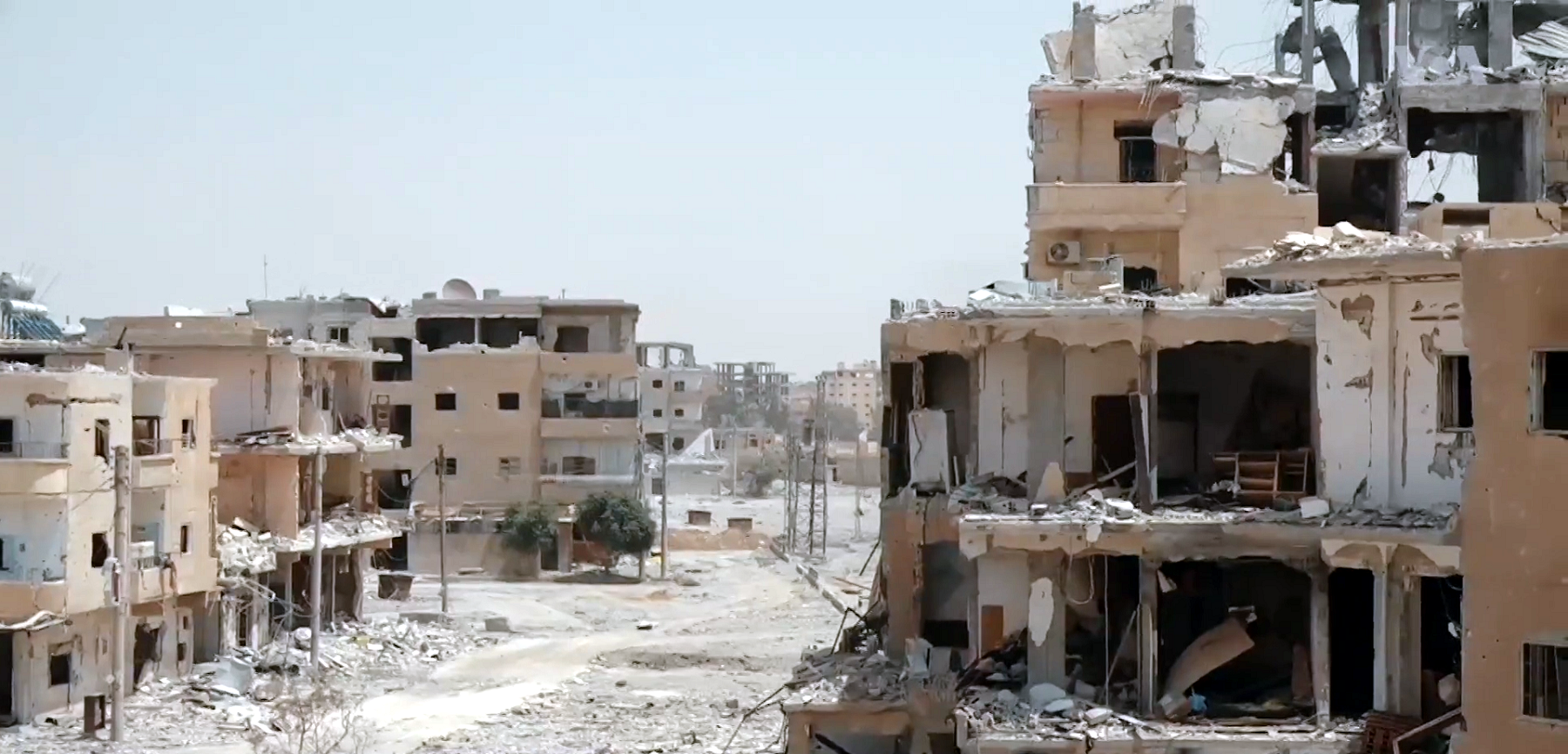
Most of Raqqa suffered extensive damage during the Second Battle of Raqqa

United Nations authorities have estimated that the war in Syria has caused destruction amounting to about $400 billion. The SNHR reported in 2017 that the war has rendered around 39% of Syrian mosques unserviceable for worship. More than 13,500 mosques were destroyed in Syria between 2011 and 2017. Around 1,400 were dismantled by 2013, while 13,000 mosques were demolished between 2013 and 2017. According to a Syrian war monitor, over 120 churches have been damaged or demolished by during the course of Syrian war since 2011, 60% of which attacks were perpetrated by pro-Assad forces. During the course of the war, Syrian President Bashar Al-Assad said that Syria would be able to rebuild the war-torn country on its own. As of July 2018, the reconstruction is estimated to cost a minimum of US$400 billion. Assad said he would be able to loan this money from friendly countries, Syrian diaspora and the state treasury. Iran has expressed interest in helping rebuild Syria. One year later this seemed to be materializing, Iran and the Syrian government signed a deal where Iran would help rebuild the Syrian energy grid, which has taken damage to 50% of the grid. International donors have been suggested as one financier of the reconstruction. As of November 2018, reports emerged that rebuilding efforts had already started. It was reported that the biggest issue facing the rebuilding process is the lack of building material and a need to make sure the resources that do exist are managed efficiently. The rebuilding effort have so far remained at a limited capacity and has often been focused on certain areas of a city, thus ignoring other areas inhabited by disadvantaged people.

Various efforts are proceeding to rebuild infrastructure in Syria. Russia says it will spend $500 million to modernize Syria's port of Tartus. Russia also said it will build a railway to link Syria with the Persian Gulf. Russia will also contribute to recovery efforts by the UN. Syria awarded oil exploration contracts to two Russian firms.

Syria announced it is in serious dialogue with China to join China's "Belt and Road Initiative" designed to foster investment in infrastructure in over one-hundred developing nations worldwide. On Wednesday 12 January 2022, China and Syria signed a memorandum of understanding in Damascus. The memorandum was signed by Fadi al-Khalil, the Head of Planning and International Cooperation Commission for the Syrian Side and Feng Biao, the Chinese ambassador in Damascus for the Chinese side. The memorandum sees Syria join the initiative whose aim is to help expand cooperation with China and other partner countries in areas such as trade, technology, capital, human movement and cultural exchange. Among other things, it aims to define the future of this cooperation with partner states.

== Aftermath ==
=== Syrian transitional government and peace process ===
On 8 December 2024, hours after the fall of Damascus, Mohammad Ghazi al-Jalali, the outgoing prime minister and last head of government of the Ba'athist regime, agreed to lead the transitional government in a caretaking capacity. He then transferred power to Mohammed al-Bashir, prime minister of the Syrian Salvation Government (SSG), two days later. On 10 December, the transitional administration announced that it would remain in place until 1 March 2025, with all ministers from the SSG taking up their same posts in the new provisional government.

A few days prior to the fall of the Assad regime, the Syrian American Council (SAC) successfully lobbied for the Caesar Act sanctions to be renewed via the US National Defense Authorization Act 2025 (NDAA 2025). However, after the fall of Assad on 8 December 2024 and establishment of the Syrian caretaker government, the SAC failed to have the sanctions clause removed from the bill in time. On 23 December, the Biden administration signed NDAA 2025 into law, renewing the sanctions for another five years, with Reason magazine labeling the sanctions "a serious obstacle to Syria's reconstruction" post-Assad.

On 29 January 2025, Syrian de facto leader Ahmed al-Sharaa was appointed President of Syria by the Syrian General Command for the transitional period and held the Syrian Revolution Victory Conference. In his first address as president, al-Sharaa said that he would hold a "national dialogue conference" and issue a "constitutional declaration" to serve as a "legal reference" during the political transition following the dissolution of the 2012 Constitution of Ba'athist Syria. Al-Sharaa promised to go after war criminals belonging to the former regime. Kurdish-led Syrian Democratic Forces (SDF) leader Mazloum Abdi congratulated al-Sharaa on assuming the Syrian presidency and invited him to visit northeast Syria. The SDF agreed to integrate into state institutions on 10 March 2025 and the Suwayda Military Council agreed to the same on 12 March 2025, marking the unification of all Syrian revolutionary factions into the transitional government.

On 29 March 2025, the Syrian transitional government was announced by al-Sharaa at a ceremony at the Presidential Palace in Damascus, in which the new ministers were sworn in and delivered speeches outlining their agendas. The government replaced the Syrian caretaker government which had been formed following the fall of the Assad regime.

=== Clashes and spillover ===
On the day that the Assad regime fell, Israel invaded southern Syria, subsuming the Golan Heights buffer zone and capturing Quneitra, Mount Hermon, and surrounding towns and villages, while also carrying out a bombing campaign against Syrian military bases. Israel has since maintained a military occupation of the buffer zone. The Turkish-backed SNA launched an offensive against the SDF, which ended with the capture of Manbij on 11 December.

Meanwhile, the SDF clashed against the government in northeast Syria over the control of Manbij as well as the minorities' rights.

Syria inadvertently became a part of the 2026 Iran war as well. Syria remained neutral, but suffered materiel damage as a result of regional attacks during the conflict.

== See also ==
- Belligerents in the Syrian civil war

=== Events within Syrian society ===
- 2010s in Syria political history
- Cities and towns during the Syrian civil war
- Eastern Syria insurgency
- Inter-rebel conflict during the Syrian civil war
- Rojava conflict
- Timeline of the Syrian civil war

=== Historical aspects ===
- Spillover of the Syrian civil war
- Syria chemical weapons program
- Syrian Captagon industry
- Syrian–Turkish border clashes during the Syrian civil war
- Terrorism in Syria
- Syrian civil war in popular culture
- Fall of the Assad regime

=== Lists and statistical records ===
- Casualty recording
- Human rights violations during the Syrian civil war
- Control of cities during the Syrian civil war
- List of Syrian defectors
- List of aviation shootdowns and accidents during the Syrian civil war
- List of terrorist incidents in Syria

=== Peace efforts and civil society groups ===
- Syrian civil war ceasefires
- Syrian Democratic Council
- Syrian diaspora
- Syrian peace process
- White Helmets (Syrian civil war)

=== History of other local conflicts ===
- Iraqi insurgency (2011–2013)
- Islamist uprising in Syria from 1976 until 1982
- List of wars involving Syria
- War in Iraq (2013–2017)
