= Syrians in Turkey =

Türkiye'deki Suriyeliler السوريون في تركيا Sûriyeyîyên li Tirkîyê
- Syrian refugee share of provincial population (as of 8 October 2026)

Total population
- c. 2.5 million Registered refugees in Temporary Protection Status: 2,195,308 (as of 12 November 2026) People with a residence permit: 88,711 (as of 8 October 2026) Turkish citizens of Syrian origin: 240,915 (as of November 2025)

Regions with significant populations
- Syrian population in descending order: Istanbul, Gaziantep, Şanlıurfa, Adana, Mersin, Hatay, Bursa, Konya, İzmir, Ankara

Languages
- Syrian Arabic, Kurdish, Turkish, Syriac

Religion
- Predominantly Sunni Islam, minorities of Shia Islam (Isma'ilism, Nusayris), Christians (Syriac Christianity, Eastern Catholic Churches).

Related ethnic groups
- Arabs, Kurds, Syrian Turkmen, Armenians, Assyrians

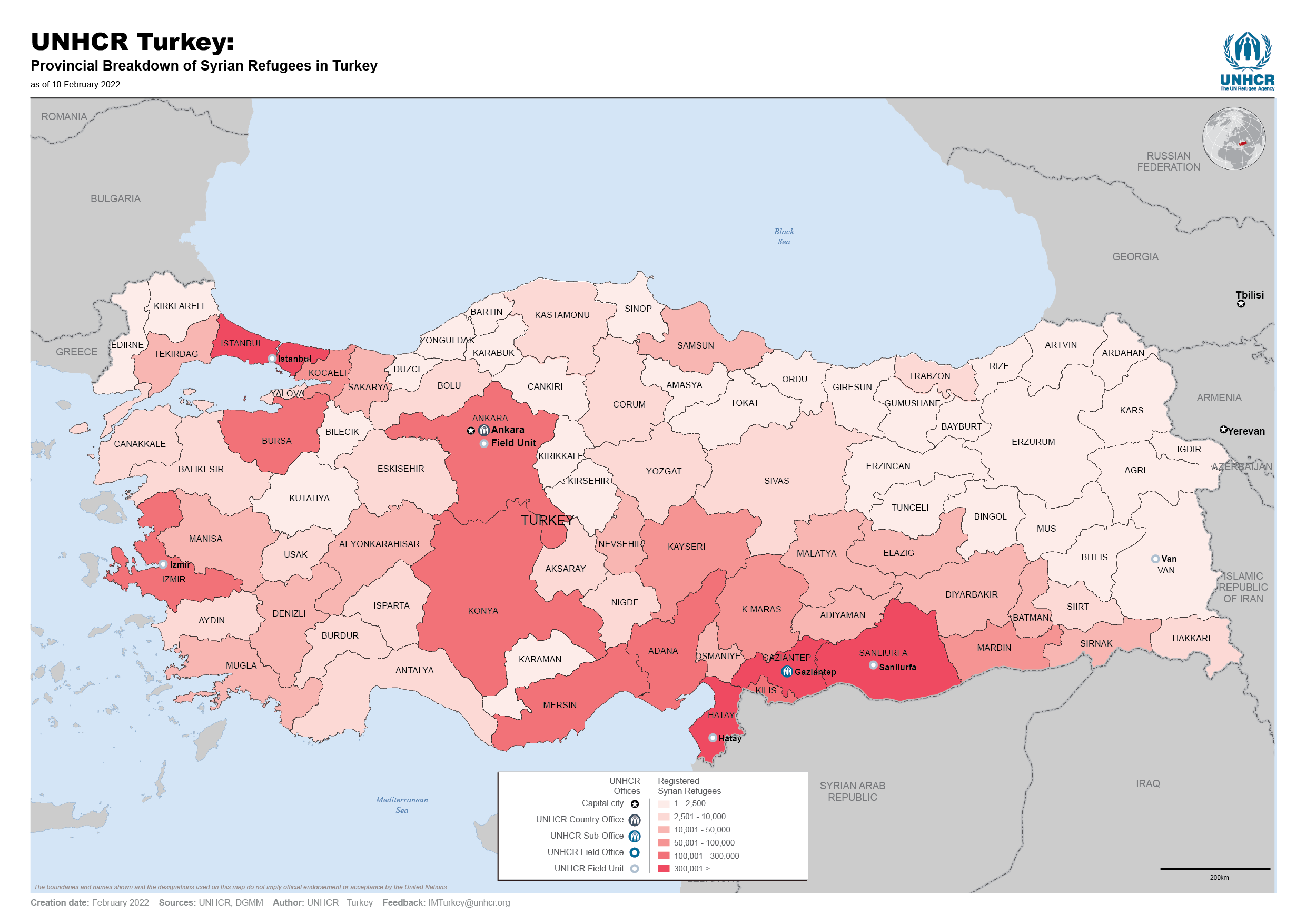
Number of registered Syrian refugees by province (as of February 10, 2022)

They include Turkish citizens of Syrian origin, Syrian refugees, and other Syrian citizens resident in Turkey. As of 2026, up to 2.1 million registered refugees of the Syrian civil war reside in Turkey, which hosts one of the biggest refugee populations in the world. In addition, more than 88,000 Syrian nationals reside in Turkey with a residence permit. Over 240 thousand Syrian nationals have acquired Turkish citizenship after 2011. Many children were born or grew up in Turkey and don't have strong ties to Syria.

Syrians are generally concentrated in the border provinces and major cities in Turkey, and only 1.3% of them live in refugee camps. Istanbul, the most populous city in Turkey, hosts the highest number of Syrian refugees, with almost 400,000 registered people.

== Disputed population size ==
Ümit Özdağ, chairman of Victory Party, alleged that number of Syrian population who gained Turkish citizenship is 1,476,368 as of July 2022. He also claimed that number of Syrians in Turkey is about 5.3 million including unregistered ones. In May 2023, during a visit to Victory Party headquarters, AKP deputy chairman Numan Kurtulmuş said that there are 4,994 million Syrians in Turkey.Reiterating his claims in October 2026, Özdağ stated that in 2021—the year he founded the Victory Party—there were a total of 13 million foreigners in Turkey, comprising 7 million Syrians (5 million registered and 2 million unregistered), 2 million Afghans, 2 million Africans, and 2 million individuals from other countries. Citing the figure of 6 million—which Nuh Yılmaz, the Ambassador to Damascus, had identified as the peak number of Syrians in Turkey—he argued that the figures announced by the Directorate of Migration Management did not reflect the reality.

== History ==
Before the Ottoman Empire was destroyed by World War I there was no definite boundary between the Syrian and Turkish parts of the Empire, but during that war Cemal Pasha exiled some Arabists from Syria to Anatolia. The current frontier was not finalised until 1939 with the transfer of Hatay from French controlled Syria. It is the longest land border of both countries and their north–south gateway.

After the start of Syrian civil war in 2011, Syrian refugees started to immigrate Turkey. The migration has accelerated in 2014 after the rise of Islamic State of Iraq and Levant. The number of Syrian refugees registered under temporary protection status peaked in 2021 with more than 3.7 million people and has been decreasing since then.

In 2017, Syrian citizens accounted for 24% of all work permits granted to foreign nationals, making Syrians the largest single group of foreign nationals with work permits.

Following the Turkish military intervention in the Afrin District in Northern Syria against the Kurdish YPG militia, some Turkish politicians have suggested that Syrian refugees in Turkey should be repatriated to Syria.

According to news releases in 2019; there are 405,521 Syrians born in Turkey since 2011, 79,820 Syrians who got Turkish citizenship, approximately 329,000 Syrians who returned to Syria, 31,185 Syrians who have working permits, and 15,159 companies which have at least one Syrian company member.

In December 2024 President Erdoğan announced he will open a third border crossing enabling more Syrian refugees to return to Syria, following the fall of the Assad regime.

More than 578,000 Syrian refugees have returned to Syria after the fall of the Assad Regime as of December 8, 2025. The Total number of refugees returned to Syria from Turkey since 2016 was over 1,318,000 as of the same date.

== Discrimination and violence ==
=== Refugee "safe zones" ===
In 2022 Turkey were criticized by Human Rights Watch for pressuring Syrians living in Turkey to move to Tell Abyad, a Turkish-occupied district of northern Syria.

=== 2024 violence ===
In 2024 there were multiple incidents to mob violence against Syrian refugees in Turkey.

== Ethnic groups ==
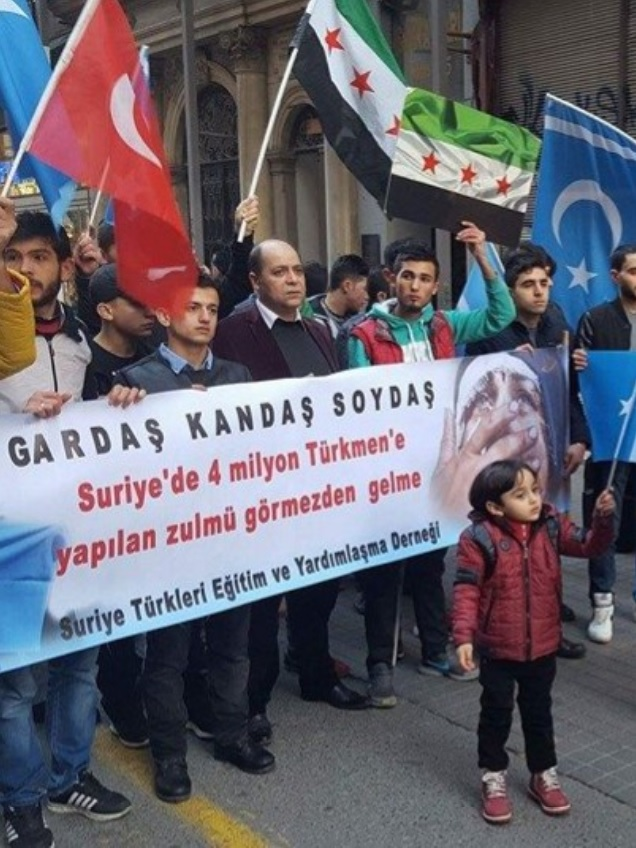
Syrian Turkmen protest in Istanbul.

Syrians living in Turkey are formed of various ethnic and religious groups. The majority are Arabs (including Palestinians) while Syrian Kurds and Syrian Turkmen make up the significant minorities. It is estimated by the UNHCR that more than 80% of the Syrian population in Turkey are ethnic Arabs, while 10-15% of them are ethnic Kurds and 10-15% of them are ethnic Turks (Syrian Turkmen). The same report indicates that 81%, 16.1% and 13.3% state their native languages as Arabic, Kurdish and Turkish, respectively. (More than one option was available.)

=== Arabs ===
Turkey has the world's third-largest population of Syrian Arabs, after Syria and Brazil.

=== Turkmen ===
By December 2016 the Turkish Foreign Ministry Undersecretary Ümit Yalçın stated that Turkey opened its borders to 500,000 Syrian Turkmen.

In 2020 the Voice of America reported that 1,000,000 Syrian Turkmen (including descendants) who are living in Turkey are requesting to become Turkish citizens.

=== Assyrians ===
Some Assyrians who have fled from ISIL have found temporary homes in the city of Midyat. A refugee center is located near Midyat, but due to there being a small Assyrian community in Midyat, many of the Assyrian refugees at the camp went to Midyat hoping for better conditions than what the refugee camp had. To their surprise, many refugees were in fact given help and accommodations by the local Assyrian community there, perhaps wishing that the refugees stay, as the community in Midyat is in need of more members.

== Social status ==
=== Education ===
As of 2021 there are 1.7 million Syrian refugee children in the country, and since 2017 the government has committed to integrating them into the national school system.

=== Economics ===
As of 2019 the trade minister said there were almost 14,000 Syrian owned businesses, which was almost 30% of the total number of foreign owned businesses, with a capital of 4 billion Turkish liras ($480 million). About 40% of businesses are estimated to be jointly owned with Turks or other nationals.

== Refugees of the Syrian civil war ==
Human toll of the Syrian civil war
- Pre-war population 22 ±.5; Internally displaced 6 ±.5, Refugees 5.5 ±.5, Fatalities 0.5 ±.1 (millions)

Syrian refugees
- By country: Turkey, Lebanon, Egypt, Jordan
- Settlements: Camps: Jordan

Internally displaced Syrians

Casualties of the war
- Crimes: War crimes, massacres, rape

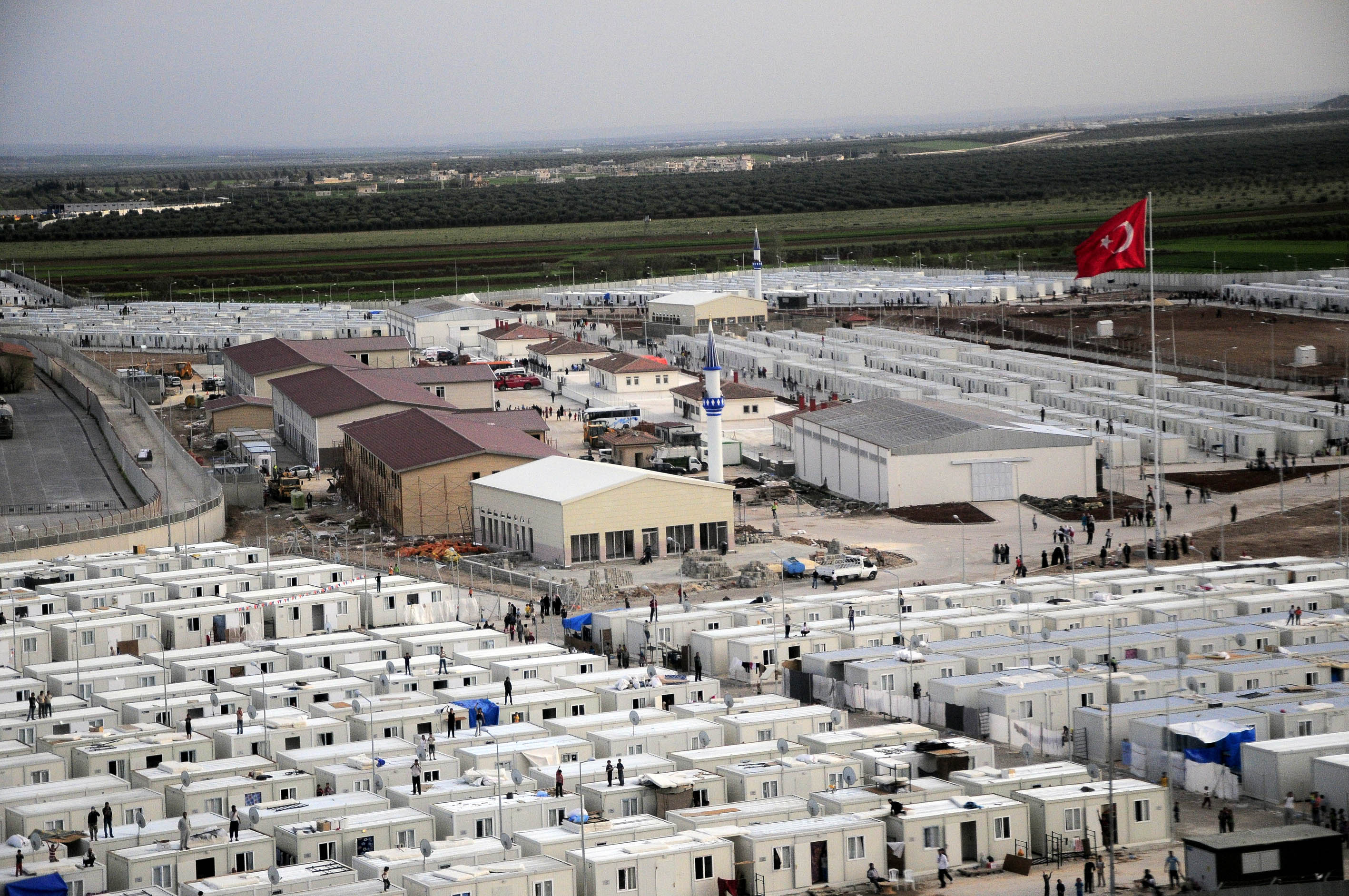
Kilis Oncupinar Accommodation Facility

Syrian refugees who fled the Syrian civil war make up the largest group of Syrians in Turkey. Turkey hosted nearly three million refugees when the Assad regime fell in December 2024.

As part of Turkey's migrant crisis, according to the United Nations High Commissioner for Refugees (UNHCR), in 2018 Turkey was hosting 63% of all of the Syrian refugees in the world. More than a third of the refugees are hosted in Southeastern Turkey, near the Syria-Turkey border.

=== Milestones ===
- June, 2011: Refugee flow into Turkey with the military siege of Jisr al-Shughour in the northwestern part of Syria.
- November, 2011: Turkey had spent up to $15 million to set up six camps for thousands of refugees and military defectors, however Turkish officials declare that Syrians are "guests" and not "refugees."
- April, 2012: Refugee flow ahead of UN ceasefire. Over 2,500 swell across Turkish-Syrian border in one day, the highest ever recorded.
- July, 2012: Refugee flow ahead of fighting in Aleppo.
- September, 2012: UNHCR reports that more than 11,000 Syrians flee into Turkey in a day's time.
- December, 2024: The Assad regime collapses and a new government is established.

=== Settlement (repatriation, transit) ===
In 2014, the capacity of the camps established in 2012 and 2013 became insufficient. In 2014, refugees according to their own preferences begin to migrate across provinces.

About 30% live in 22 government-run camps near the Syrian border.

The number of refugees in transit to Europe dramatically increased in 2015.

==== Citizenship ====
Up to 300,000 Syrian refugees living in Turkey could be given citizenship, allegedly, under a plan to keep wealthy and educated Syrians in the country. The current policy towards the Syrian refugees provides temporary protection and homage non-European refugees. According to the policy, Turkey has a legal responsibility towards European refugees only, but for the rest it is only through voluntary action. The temporary protection offered by Turkey to Syrians seeking refuge in the country means that they are limited in some ways. Under temporary protection, Syrians in Turkey are limited from working, especially in formal employment. The temporary protection policy does not guarantee the Syrian refugees permanent protection that would allow them to compete for jobs equally with the Turkish citizens. In some cases the large number of refugees in the country has contributed to the nation changing its citizenship laws to integrate some of the refugees from Syria. Skilled Syrians are provided with citizenship because they contribute positively to the growth of the economy. There is no automatic citizenship for those born in the country.

=== Conditions ===
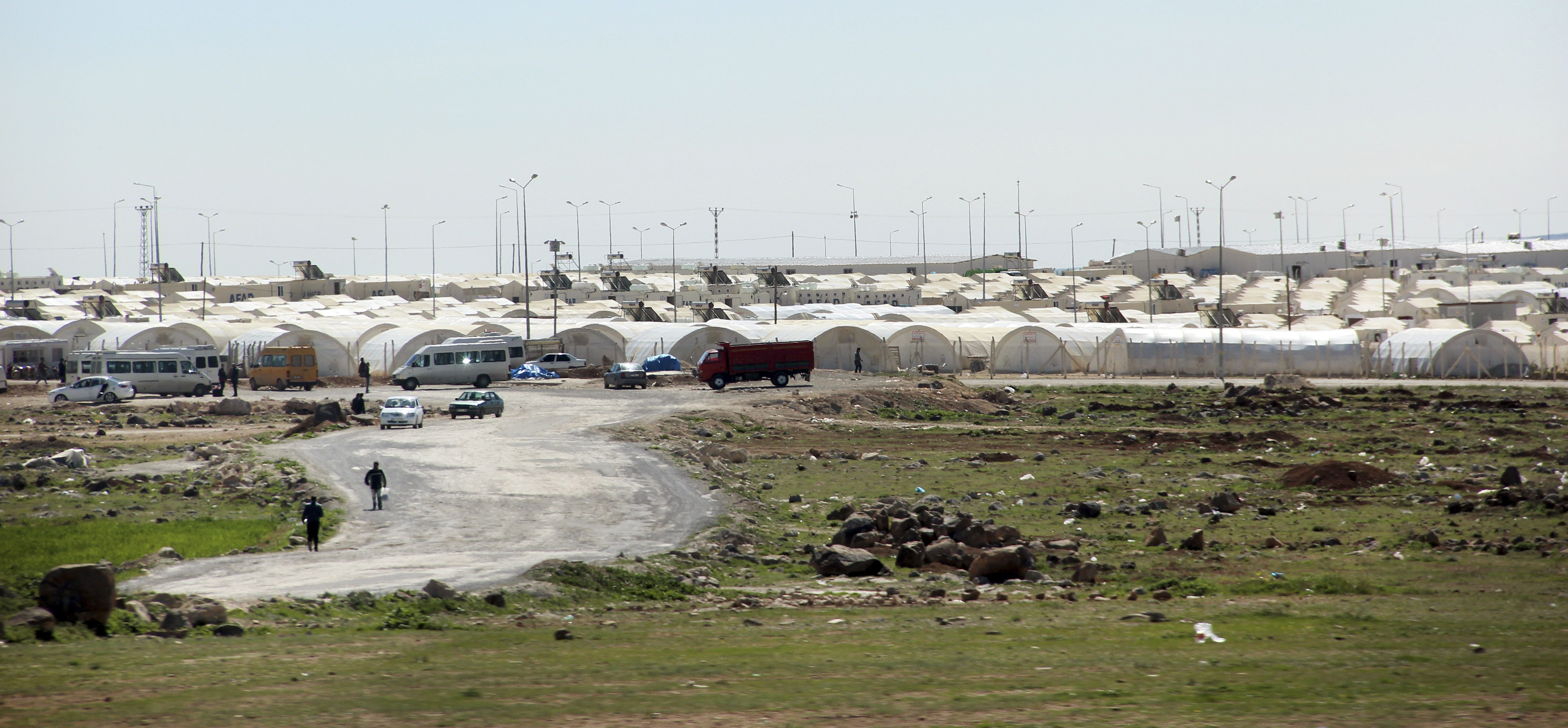
Suruç refugee center

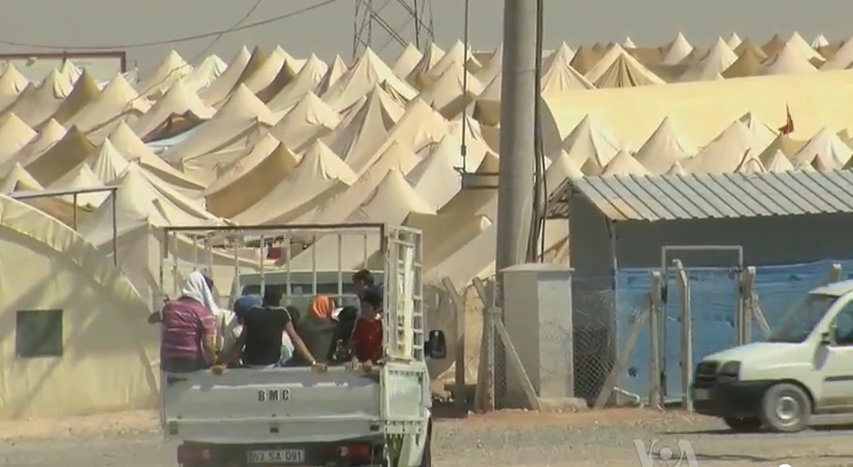
Syrian refugee center on the Turkish border 80 kilometres from Aleppo, Syria (3 August 2012).

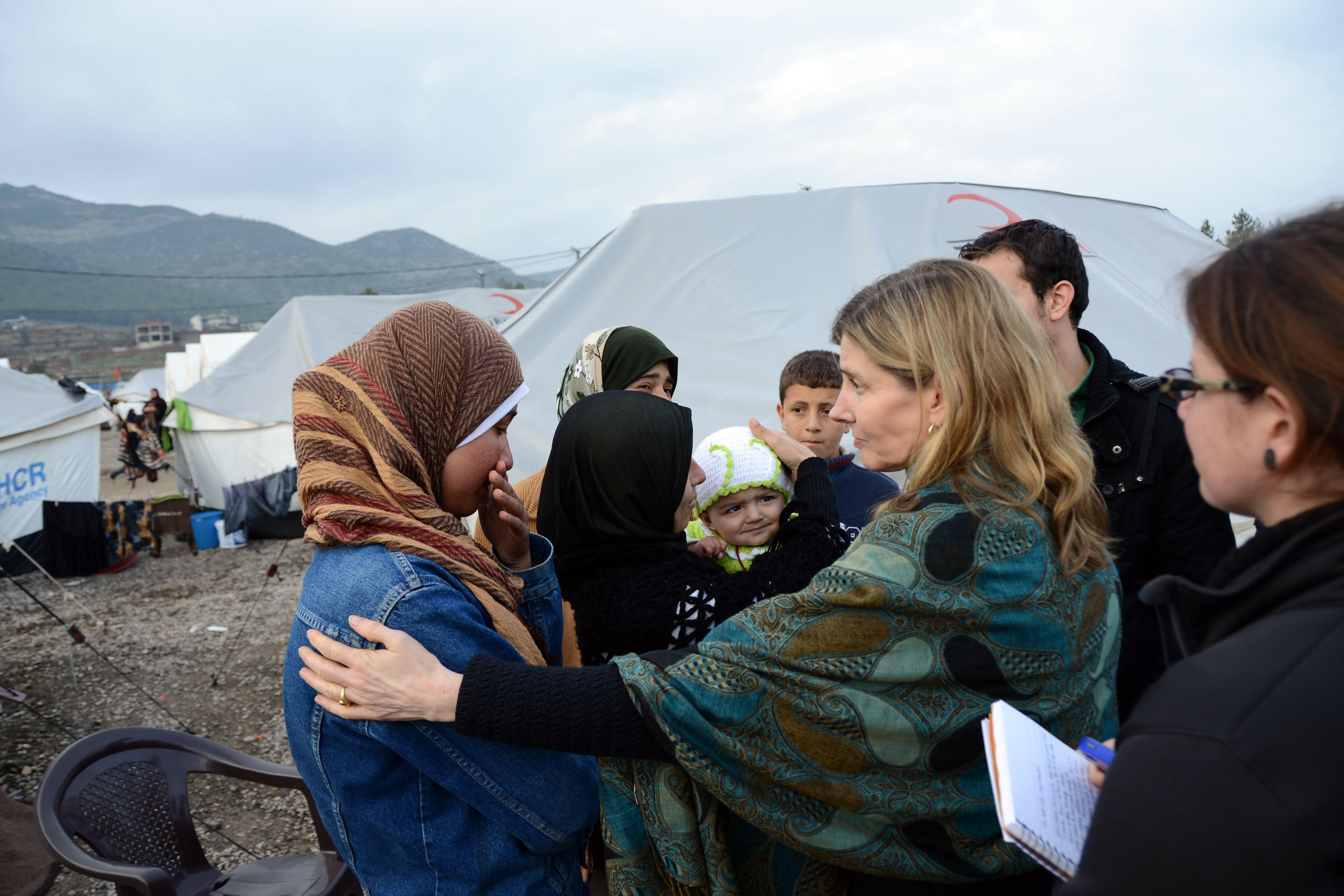
USAID Assistant Administrator Lindborg with refugees in Turkey

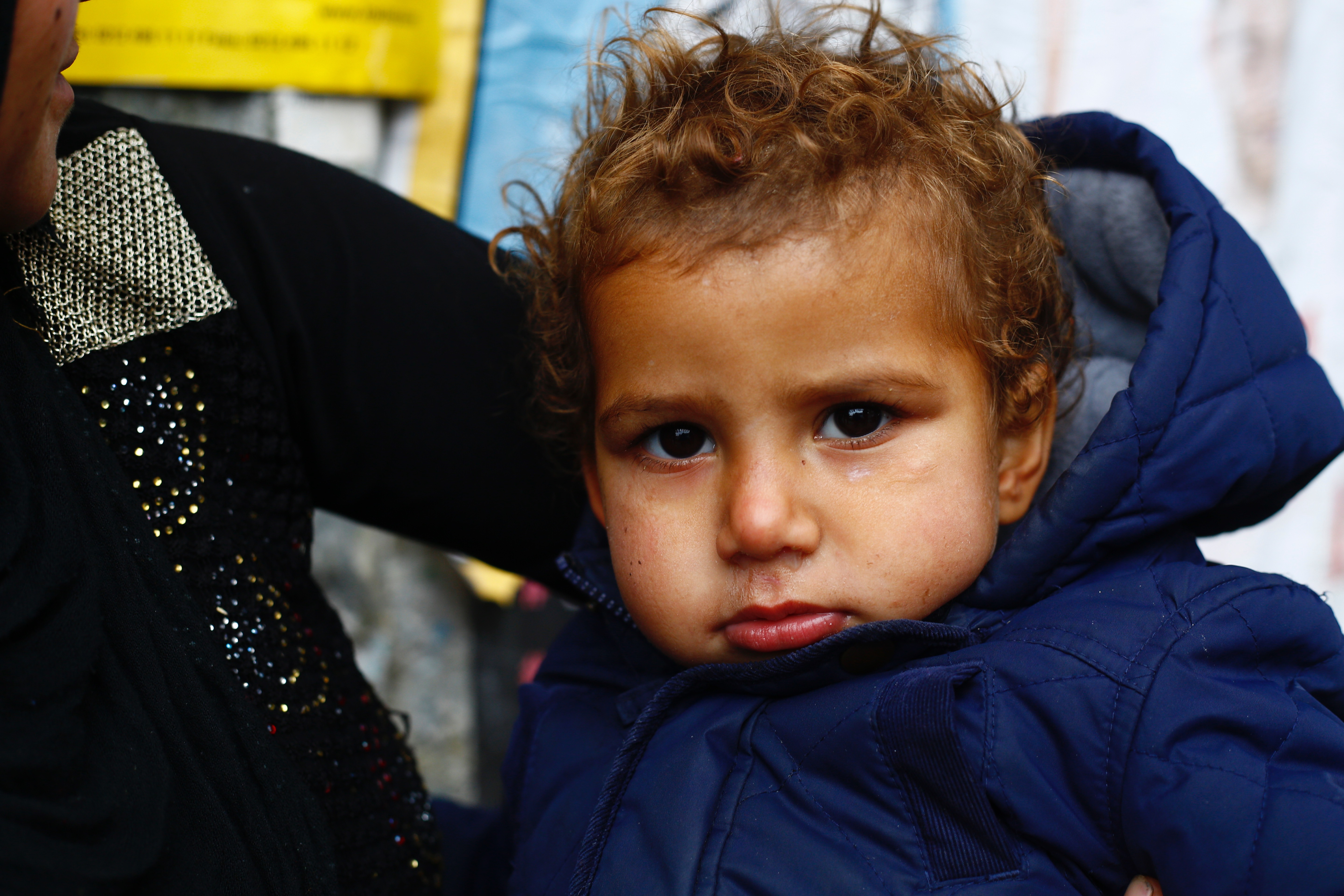
A Syrian refugee child in Istanbul

^{(This figure is unduly precise)}

As of April 2014 (2011–2014):

- 595,280 individuals reached through information campaigns, participatory assessments, activities to raise public awareness on rights, entitlements, services and assistance;
- 205,899 children with protection needs were identified and referred to services;
- 115,225 children participated in structured, sustained child protection or psycho-social support programme;
- 145,433 youth and adolescents have attended empowerment programme enhancing their participation, communication, peer-to-peer interaction and self-confidence;
- 18,793 Individuals, including children, have been reached through community-based initiatives for prevention and mitigation of gender-based violence;

As of April 2018 (2011–2018):

- 593,616 individuals have received hygiene kits, dignity kits or sanitary items;
- 87,198 individuals have benefited from assistance in accessing adequate shelter;
- 470,000 Syrians and host community members have benefited from improved municipal services, focusing among others on waste and waste water management.

==== Financial aid ====
Turkey allocated US$30 billion between 2011 and 2018 on refugee assistance.

Millions of Syrians received aid from the Turkish Aid Agency (AFAD). Turkey has spent more than any other country on Syrian refugee aid, and has also been subject to criticism for opening refugee camps on the Syrian side of the border.

Financial aid from other countries to Syrian Refugees has been limited, though €3,200,000,000 was promised by the EU in November 2015. In March 2016, the EU and Turkey agreed on the EU-Turkey Statement, which involved a number of political concessions as well as 'another €3 billion in aid, if Turkey agreed to a readmission of Syrians arriving in Greece and tighter border controls.'

In 2018, the Directorate General of Migration Management built a fingerprint identification system for a more efficient distribution of financial aid to Syrian Refugees.

On 2 December 2021, the EU announced it would be providing assistance of €325 million (around $368 million) for refugees in Turkey. The aid would be loaded on to the debit cards of refugees, helping more than 1.5 million to cover their most essential needs, such as food, rent, transport and medicine.

==== Employment ====
Under Turkish law, Syrian refugees cannot apply for resettlement but only temporary protection status. Registering for temporary protection status gives access to state services such as health and education, as well as the right to apply for a work permit in certain geographic areas and professions.

A study which was supported by the Istanbul University Scientific Research Projects unit and conducted by academics from a number of universities, revealed that the vast majority of Syrians in Turkey are employed in unregistered work for significantly lower wages compared to their Turkish counterparts.

However, compared to the increase in refugees, benefits for the increased number of people did not increase accordingly. In fact, only 712,218 were given residency permits only 56,024 work permits were given to the Syrians by 2017.

==== Housing ====
Turkey's response to the refugee crisis is different from most other countries. As a World Bank report noted: It is a non-camp and government financed approach, as opposed to directing refugees into camps that rely on humanitarian aid agencies for support.

==== Nativism, welfare chauvinism and militarism ====
Nativism emerged as a significant issue in Turkish politics concerning Syrian immigration and refugees. In recent years, the Turkish public discussions have witnessed an increase in patriotism during the cross-border military offensive against the Syrian regime, with nationalist keywords being used to target Syrian immigrants and refugees. The COVID-19 pandemic further exacerbated the situation, with welfare chauvinism dominating the social media discourse. Turkish citizens are increasingly viewed as deserving of priority in social benefits offered by the government, leading to negative attitudes towards immigrants. However, despite the anti-immigrant sentiments, symbolic nativism is barely present in discussions, and cultural markers are not strongly emphasized. Immigrants are seldom framed as a threat to the "Turkish way of life," and instead, the cowardice of immigrants is a frequently recurring concept in social media posts with patriotic content. This complex interplay between patriotism, welfare chauvinism, and anti-immigrant attitudes in Turkish politics is an area of ongoing research and analysis. Another academic analysis says that militarism (about both historical and current military conflicts in Syria) is important in how Turks think about their nationality.

==== Racism ====
Anti-Arab sentiments in the country have significantly increased since the influx of Syrian refugees into Turkey.

=== Education ===
As of March 2018, about 60% (600,000 primary and secondary education) of Syrian school-aged children under temporary protection remain in school. The EU has supported education, through a €300 million direct grant to the Ministry of National Education. Turkey's educational support:

- National Conditional Cash Transfers for Education of 2017 (CCTE): 300,000 Syrian children's family received. Cash Transfers to families encourages (1) enrolment, (2) improves school attendance (3) referral of children at risk to Child Protective Services
- Early childhood and pre-primary education: 45,580 enrolment.
- Formal education (Grades 1–12): 612,603 enrolment.
- Informal non-accredited education (Sunday school): 20,806 enrolment.
- State universities: 19,332 enrolment (Turkey waived tuition fees)
- Accelerated Learning Programme (ALP): targeting 10 to 18-year-old out-of-school adolescents.
- Teachers and education personnel: 128,843 education personnel acquired special training. 12,965 Syrian volunteer trainers and education personnel were provided with financial compensation.

=== Healthcare ===
As of October 2014 (2011–2014), Turkey provided with its own resources:

- 250,000 inpatient care;
- 200,000 operated on;
- 150,000 births;
- 6 million consultations

=== Statistics ===
As of 31 March 2022 there are 3,763,565 registered Syrian refugees in Turkey.

== See also ==
- Syria–Turkey relations
- Syrian civil war
- Refugees of the Syrian civil war
- Arabs in Turkey
- Syrian Turkmen
- Syrians in Jordan
- Syrians in Lebanon
- United Nations High Commissioner for Refugees
