= AFAD =

AFAD may refer to:

- Afet ve Acil Durum Yönetimi Başkanlığı, Disaster and Emergency Management Organization of Turkey
- Academie de Foot Amadou Diallo, Ivorian football club
- Automated Flagger Assistance Device, a traffic control safety technology
