= Immigration to Turkey =

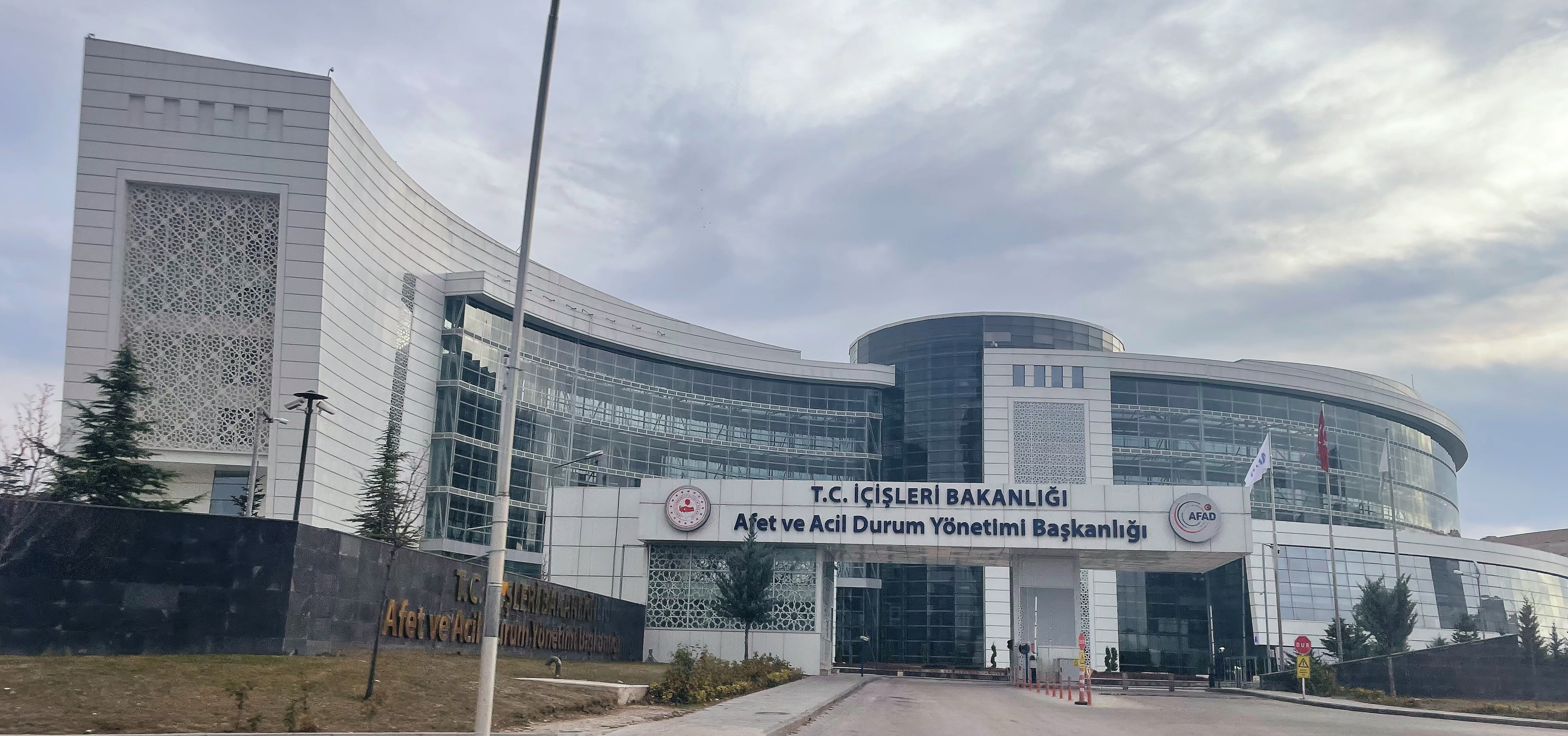
The immigration crisis has been managed by the Disaster and Emergency Management Presidency also known as AFAD.

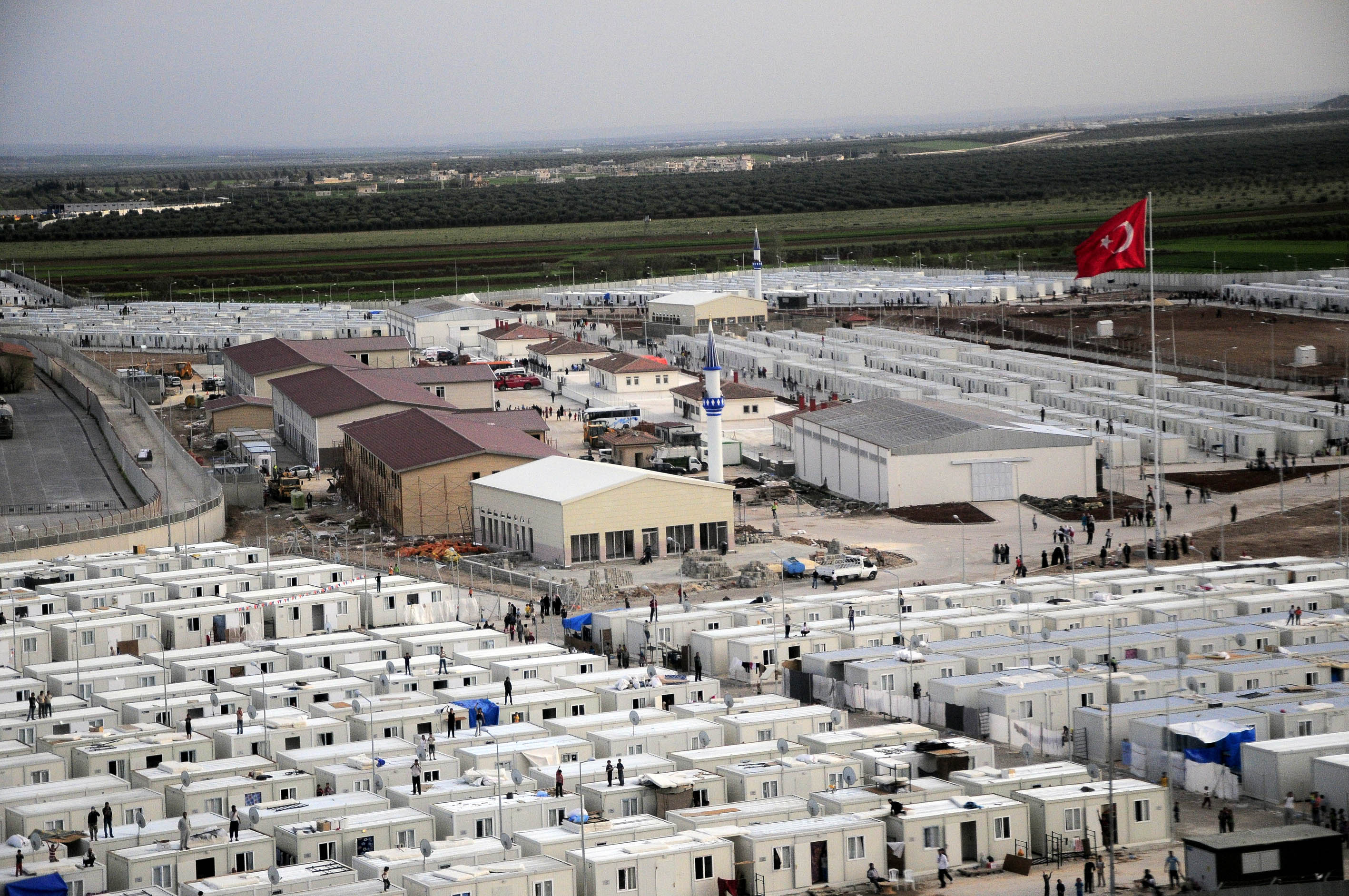
Syrian refugees at Kilis Oncupinar Accommodation Facility

Immigration to Turkey is the process by which people migrate to Turkey to reside in the country. Many, but not all, become Turkish citizens. After the dissolution of the Ottoman Empire and following Turkish War of Independence, an exodus by the large portion of Turkish (Turkic) and Muslim peoples from the Balkans (Balkan Turks, Albanians, Bosniaks, Pomaks), Caucasus (Abkhazians, Ajarians, 'Circassians', Chechens), Crimea (Crimean Tatar diaspora), and Greece (Muslim Roma, Greek Muslims, Vallahades, Nantinets, Cretan Turks) took refuge in present-day Turkey and moulded the country's fundamental features. Trends of immigration towards Turkey continue to this day, although the motives are more varied and are usually in line with the patterns of global immigration movements. Turkey's migrant crisis is a following period since the 2010s, characterized by high numbers of people arriving and settling in Turkey.

== Names ==
There are three Names in Turkish for Balkan Turks and other Muslims of former Ottoman Empire to describe the Immigrants who went to Turkey.

- Muhacir (Muslims from Balkans and Caucasus in Ottoman Empire)
- Mübadil (Muslims from Greece in 1923 from Greece to Turkey)
- Göçmen (Muslims from Yugoslavia, Bulgaria, Romania, Cyprus, Greece after 1930 to Turkey).

== History ==
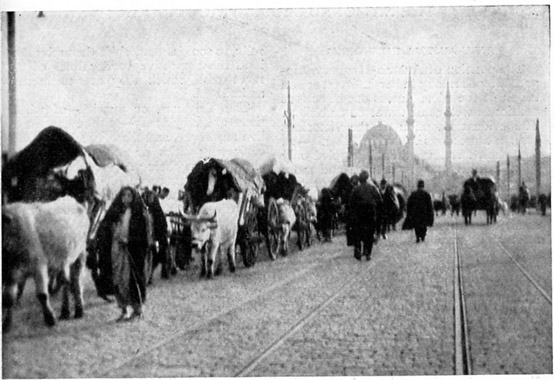
Muhacirs arriving in Constantinople (Istanbul), Ottoman Empire, in 1912. They are the estimated 10 million Ottoman Muslim citizens, and their descendants born after the onset of the dissolution of the Ottoman Empire

Historically, the Ottoman Empire was the primary destination for Muslim refugees from areas conquered—or re-conquered—by Christian powers, notably Russia in the Caucasus and Black Sea areas, Austria-Hungary, Greece, Bulgaria, Serbia, Montenegro (later Yugoslavia) and Romania in the Balkans. Nonetheless, the Ottoman Empire was also a popular destination for non-Muslim refugees: the most obvious examples are the Sephardic Jews given refuge mainly in the 16th century with the expulsion of the Jews from Spain and Portugal (as well as before and afterwards), whose descendants form the core of the community of Jews in Turkey today; and the village of Polonezköy in Istanbul. From the 1930s to 2016 migration added two million Muslims in Turkey. The majority of these immigrants were the Balkan Turks who faced harassment and discrimination in their homelands. New waves of Turks and other Muslims expelled from Bulgaria and Yugoslavia between 1951 and 1953 were followed to Turkey by another exodus from Bulgaria in 1983–89, bringing the total of immigrants to nearly ten million people. More recently, Meskhetian Turks have emigrated to Turkey from the former Soviet Union states (particularly in Ukraine – after the Annexation of Crimea by the Russian Federation in 2014), and many Iraqi Turkmen and Syrian Turkmen have taken refuge in Turkey due to the recent Iraq War (2003–2011) and Syrian Civil War (2011–2024).

=== Pre-Colonial Migration Crisis, 1522–1701 ===
Turkey's first migration crisis began in 1522, when Ibn Kemal (an Ottoman Historian) recorded his findings of an estimated 6.2 million Turkish citizens migrating from Cyrenaican, Middle Arabian, Iraqi and Lebanese territories to northern and southern European territories, such as Spain, Italy, France, and to an extent Germany. The cause for the mass immigration is thought to be due to the governmental suppression of rights for non-Turkish and Anatolian Arabians.

=== Treaty of Lausanne initial borders ===
A decision taken by the Turkish Government at the end of 1925, for instance, noted that the Turks of Cyprus had, according to the Treaty of Lausanne, the right to emigrate to the republic, and therefore, families that so emigrated would be given a house and sufficient land. Economic motives played an important part in the Turkish Cypriot migration wave as conditions for the poor in Cyprus during the 1920s were especially harsh. Enthusiasm to emigrate to Turkey was inflated by the euphoria that followed the creation of the Republic of Turkey and later of promises of assistance to Turks who emigrated. The precise number of those who emigrated to Turkey remains unknown. The press in Turkey reported in mid-1927 that of those who had opted for Turkish nationality, 5,000–6,000 Turkish Cypriots had already settled in Turkey. However, many Turkish Cypriots had already emigrated even before the rights accorded to them under the Treaty of Lausanne had come into force. St. John-Jones tried to accurately estimate the true demographic impact of Turkish Cypriot emigration to Turkey between 1881–1931. He supposed that:

[I]f the Turkish-Cypriot community had, like the Greek-Cypriots, increased by 101 per cent between 1881 and 1931, it would have totalled 91,300 in 1931 – 27,000 more than the number enumerated. Is it possible that so many Turkish-Cypriots emigrated in the fifty-year period? Taken together, the considerations just mentioned suggest that it probably was. From a base of 45,000 in 1881, emigration of anything like 27,000 persons seems huge, but after subtracting the known 5,000 of the 1920s, the balance represents an average annual outflow of some 500 – not enough, probably, to concern the community's leaders, evoke official comment, or be documented in any way which survives today.

=== Population transfer between Greece and Turkey, 1923 ===
Population exchange between Greece and Turkey brought 400,000. In 1923, more than half a million Muslims of various nationalities arrived from Greece as part of the population transfer between Greece and Turkey (the population exchange was not based on ethnicity, but by religious affiliation; as Turkey was seen as a Muslim country while Greece was viewed as a Christian country).

An article published in The Times on December 5, 1923, stated that:

"...This transfer of populations is made especially difficult by the fact that few if any of the Turks in Greece desire to leave and most of them will resort to every possible expedient to avoid being sent away. A thousand Turks who voluntarily emigrated from Crete to Smyrna have sent several deputations to the Greek government asking to be allowed to return. Groups of Turks from all parts of Greece have submitted petitions for exemption. A few weeks ago, a group of Turks from Crete came to Athens with a request that they be baptized into the Greek church and thus be entitled to consideration as Greeks. The government however declined to permit this evasion."

The only exclusions from the forced transfer were the Greeks living in Constantinople (Istanbul) and the Turks of Western Thrace. The remaining Turks living in Greece have since continuously emigrated to Turkey, a process which has been facilitated by Article 19 of the Greek Nationality Law which the Greek state has used to deny re-entry of Turks who leave the country, even for temporary periods, and deprived them of their citizenship. Since 1923, between 300,000 and 400,000 Turks of Western Thrace left the region, most of them went to Turkey.

=== Expulsions from Balkans & Russia, 1925–1961 ===
After 1925, Turkey continued to accept Turkic-speaking Muslims as immigrants and did not discourage the emigration of members of non-Turkic minorities. More than 90% of all immigrants arrived from the Balkan countries. Turkey continued to receive large numbers of refugees from former Ottoman territories, until the end of Second World War.

Turkey received 350,000 Turks between 1923 and 1930. From 1934–45, 229,870 refugees and immigrants came to Turkey. An agreement made, on September 4, 1936, between Romania and Turkey allowed 70,000 Romanian Turks to leave the Dobruja region for Turkey. Between 1935–40, for example, approximately 124,000 Bulgarians and Romanians of Turkish origin emigrated to Turkey, and between 1954-56 about 35,000 Muslim Slavs emigrated from Yugoslavia. More than 800,000 people came to Turkey between 1923 and 1945. German and Austrian refugees escaping from Nazism took refugee in Turkey in the 1930s. Around 800 refugees including university professors, scientists, artists and philosophers, sought asylum in Turkey between 1933 and 1945. An additional 160,000 people (mostly Albanians) immigrated to Turkey after the establishment of Communist Yugoslavia from 1946 to 1961. Since 1961, immigrants from that Yugoslavia amounted to 50,000 people.

By the 1960s, inhabitants living in the Turkish exclave of Ada Kaleh were forced to leave the island when it was destroyed in order to build the Iron Gate I Hydroelectric Power Station, which caused the extinction of the local community through the migration of all individuals to different parts of Romania and Turkey.

By 1980, Turkey had admitted approximately 1,300,000 immigrants; 36% came from Bulgaria, 25% from Greece, 22.1% from Yugoslavia, and 8.9% from Romania. These Balkan immigrants, as well as smaller numbers of Turkic immigrants from Cyprus and the Soviet Union, were granted full citizenship upon their arrival in Turkey. The immigrants were settled primarily in the Marmara and Aegean regions (78%) and in Central Anatolia (11.7%).

=== Expulsions from Cyprus & Cyprus Emergency ===
The Cyprus Emergency was a conflict fought in British Cyprus between 1955 and 1959. According to Ali Suat Bilge, taking into consideration the mass migrations of 1878, the First World War, the 1920s early Turkish Republican era, and the Second World War, overall, a total of approximately 100,000 Turkish Cypriots had left the island for Turkey between 1878–1945. By August 31, 1955, a statement by Turkey's Minister of State and Acting Foreign Minister, Fatin Rüştü Zorlu, at the London Conference on Cyprus, stated that:

Consequently, today [1955] as well, when we take into account the state of the population in Cyprus, it is not sufficient to say, for instance, that 100,000 Turks live there. One should rather say that 100,000 out of 24,000,000 Turks live there and that 300,000 Turkish Cypriots live in various parts of Turkey.

By 2001 the TRNC Ministry of Foreign Affairs estimated that 500,000 Turkish Cypriots were living in Turkey.

=== Gulf War ===
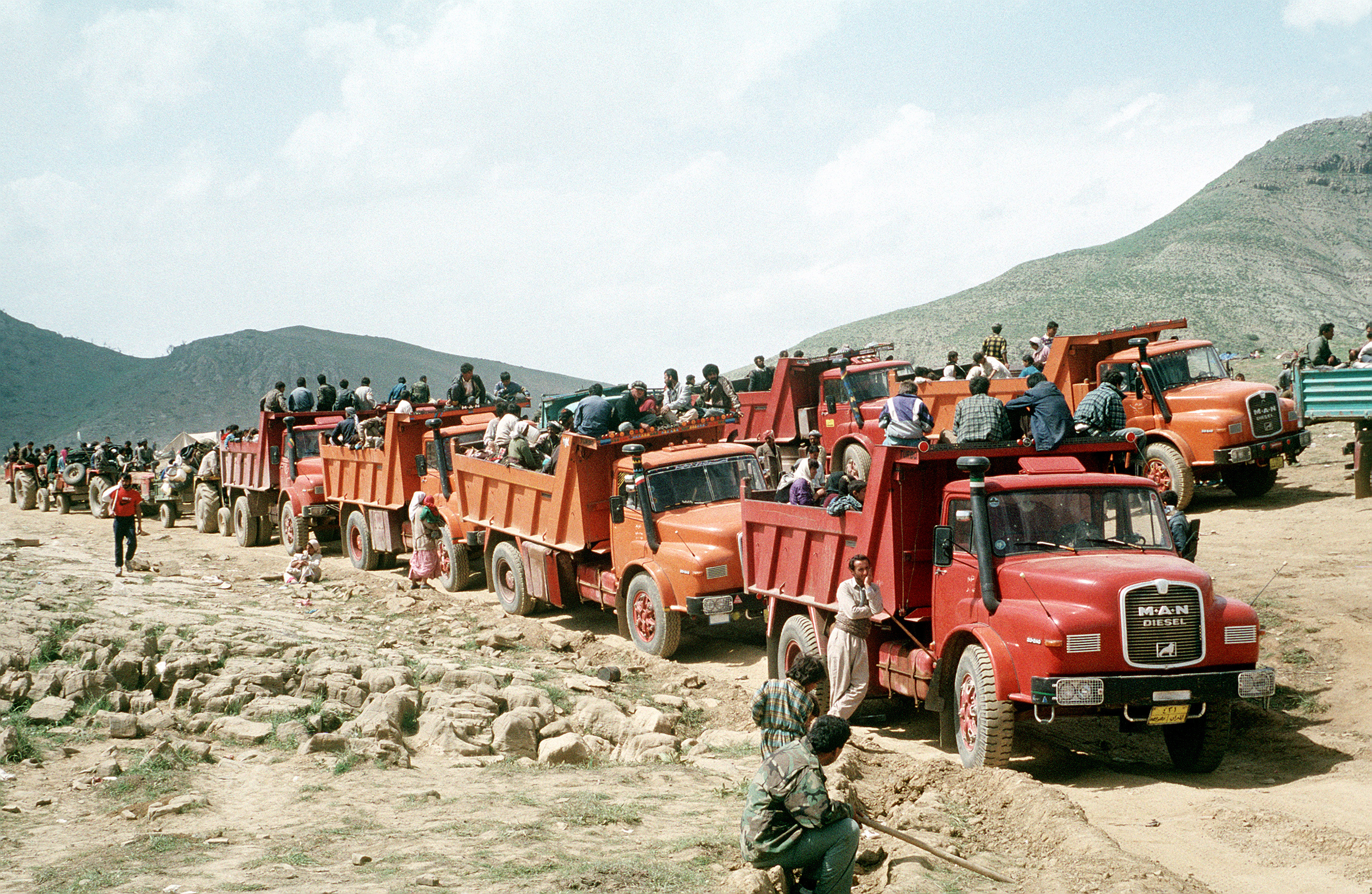
Iraqi Kurds fleeing to Turkey in April 1991, during the Gulf War

Following the suppression of the Kurdish uprising in spring 1991, after the Gulf War ceasefire, hundreds of thousands of Kurds fled toward the Turkish border. Turkey largely refused entry, leaving many stranded in the mountains; the UNHCR estimated around 280,000 had crossed into Turkey by April 6, 1991. Most returned to Iraq within months after the establishment of a UN-protected safe haven in northern Iraq, with only around 8,000 remaining in Turkey by early 1992.

=== Big Excursion, 1988–1994 ===
The "Big Excursion" was, until the Syrian refugee crisis of 2011, the most recent immigration influx, and primarily concerned Bulgarian Turks and Bosnian Muslims. In 1989, an estimated 320,000 Bulgarian Turks fled to Turkey to escape a campaign of forced assimilation. Following the collapse of Communism in Bulgaria, the number of Bulgarian Turks seeking refuge in Turkey declined to fewer than 1,000 per month. In fact, the number of Bulgarian Turks who voluntarily repatriated (125,000) actually exceeded new arrivals from the country. By March 1994, a total of 245,000 Bulgarian Turks had been granted Turkish citizenship. However, Turkey no longer regards Bulgarian Turks as refugees. Beginning in 1994, new entrants to Turkey have been detained and deported. As of December 31, 1994, an estimated 20,000 Bosniaks were living in Turkey, mostly in the Istanbul area. About 2,600 were living in camps, the rest were dispersed in private residences. More recent estimates put the number of Bosniaks in Turkey at 3 to 5 million.

=== Turkey's migration crisis ===
Turkey's migrant crisis or Turkey's refugee crisis is a period during the 2010s characterized by high numbers of people arriving in Turkey. As reported by UNHCR in 2018, Turkey is hosting 63.4% of all the refugees (from Syria, Africa, and Afghanistan) in the world. As of 2019, Refugees of the Syrian Civil War in Turkey (3.6 million) are the highest "registered" refugees. Turkey has traditionally been a major transit port for illegal immigrants to enter the European Union, but as Turkey has grown in wealth, it now finds itself a major focal point in illegal immigration.

As of August 2023, the number of refugees of the Syrian civil war in Turkey was estimated to be 3,307,882 people. The number of Syrians had decreased by 205,894 people since the beginning of the year.

As of May 2023, approximately 96,000 Ukrainian refugees of the 2022 Russian invasion of Ukraine have sought refuge in Turkey. In 2022, nearly 100 000 Russian citizens migrated to Turkey, becoming the first in the list of foreigners who moved to Turkey, meaning an increase of more than 218% from 2021.

== Citizenship ==
Turkish nationality law is based primarily on the principle of jus sanguinis. Children who are born to a Turkish mother or a Turkish father (in or out of marriage) are Turkish citizens from birth. The intention to renounce Turkish citizenship (or acquire citizenship from another state) is submitted in Turkey by a petition to the highest administrative official in the concerned person's place of residence, and when overseas to the Turkish consulate. Documents processed by these authorities are forwarded to the Ministry of Interior (Turkey) for appropriate action.

=== Turkey Citizenship by Investment Program ===
In 2016, Turkey implemented a Golden Visa program that allows foreign investors to obtain a Turkish passport typically within six months. Citizenship can be acquired after a formal citizenship application along with an investment requirement, such as purchasing real estate worth at least $400,000, purchasing $500,000 worth of government bonds and holding them for at least three years or making a capital investment of at least $500,000, among other options. The relevant law governing the program was amended on 13 May 2022 to raise the capital requirements for real estate investment to $400,000 USD from the previous $250,000.

== Protections ==
Turkey is part of the executive committee of UNHCR and a member state of the IOM.

Conventions that are applicable in Turkey:

- United Nations Convention relating to the Status of Refugees,
- Convention relating to the Status of Stateless Persons,
- United Nations Convention on the Rights of the Child
- International Convention on the Protection of the Rights of All Migrant Workers and Members of Their Families
- Protocol to Prevent, Suppress and Punish Trafficking in Persons, Especially Women and Children
- Council of Europe Convention on Action against Trafficking in Human Beings

Conventions that are not applicable in Turkey:

- International Labour Organization (ILO) Migration for Employment Convention
- United Nations Convention on the Reduction of Statelessness,
- Migrant Workers (Supplementary Provisions) Convention, 1975

=== Regulations ===
see: Law on Foreigners and International Protection and the Temporary Protection

Regulations on refugees, asylum seekers, transit migrants available from the website:

=== Bi-and multi-lateral dialog ===
Turkey was chair of the Global Forum on Migration and Development. Turkey hosted the World Humanitarian Summit in 2016. Turkey participates in bilateral migration negotiations, discussions and consultations, in particular with EU member states. Examples are:

- Budapest Process
- Prague Process
- Almaty Process
- Bali Process.

Turkey and the EU have launched a dialogue on visas, mobility and migration. After the 2015 G20 Antalya summit held in November 2015 there was a new push forward in Turkey's European Union accession negotiations, including a goal of lifting the visa requirement for Turkish citizens travelling in the Schengen Area of the European Union. After the 2015 G20 Antalya summit, the EU welcomed the Turkey's commitment to accelerate the fulfilment of the Visa Roadmap benchmarks set forth by participating EU member states. A joint action plan was drafted with the European Commission which developed a roadmap with certain benchmarks for the elimination of the visa requirement. In May 2016, the European Commission said that Turkey had met most of the 72 criteria needed for a visa waiver, and it invited EU legislative institutions of the bloc to endorse the move for visa-free travel by Turkish citizens within the Schengen Area by June 30, 2016. The European Parliament, would have to approve the visa waiver for it to enter into practice and Turkey must fulfil the final five criteria. Turkey has a number of formal bilateral agreements with sending/receiving countries. It currently has bilateral social security agreements with 28 countries bilateral labour agreements with 12 countries, including Germany, Austria, Belgium, the Netherlands, France and Sweden.

=== Visa System ===
Turkey developed an E-ikamet (E-residence) system, as well as a system to monitor the visa process. The electronic visa application system is integrated with the Police Intranet System, PolNet. The Directorate-General of Migration Management of Turkey (DGMM) institutional database GöçNet (Migration Network) is connected to the PolNet (Police Network) database.

=== Drugs-Crime-Sexual exploitation of immigrants ===
An inter-agency national commission responsible for countering human trafficking. Turkey collects and publishes information annually on counter-trafficking activities. Drugs-Crime-Sexual exploitation category had 183 victims in 2016, Syrians (36), followed by Kyrgyz (33), Georgians (23), and Uzbeks (16); the other 73 victims were Indonesia, Moldova, Morocco, Pakistan, and Turkmenistan aggregated.

== Immigration rate ==
Immigration to Turkey from the Balkans:

Country	1923–1949	1950–1959	1960–1969	1970–1979	1980–1989	1990–1999	2000–2007	TOTAL
Bulgaria	220,085	154,473	2,582	113,562	225,892	74,564	138	791,296
Greece	394,753	14,787	2,081	0	4	0	0	408,625
Yugoslavia	117,212	138,585	42,512	2,940	2,550	2,159	1,548	307,506
Romania	121,339	5	259	147	686	126	2	122,564
Others	10,109	4,222	1,047	139	4,457	773	49	20,796
TOTAL	825,022	312,072	48,481	16,788	233,589	77,622	1,731	1,650,787

== Immigration categories ==
=== Foreign-born population ===
Foreign-born population of Turkey:

Place of birth	1955	1970	1990	2000	2015
Bulgaria	295,917	255,147	462,767	480,817	378,658
Greece	257,035	201,123	101,752	59,217	26,928
Yugoslavia	133,762	254,790	183,499		
Romania	68,112	60,398		20,736	9,512
North Macedonia				31,515	43,400
Germany			176,820	273,535	263,318
France			10,280	15,976	28,507
Netherlands			9,916		32,345
United Kingdom				18,914	32,140
United States	5,997	17,179	12,868		24,026
Russia	29,151	17,825	11,430	19,856	34,486
Syria	7,156				76,413
Iraq			27,303		97,528
Albania	6,639				2,488
Iran	5,950	6,283	10,463		36,226
Algeria					35,789
Saudi Arabia	4,109	7,886			14,573
Cyprus/Northern Cyprus		6,378			20,402
Azerbaijan				16,787	52,836
Uzbekistan					36,083
Islamic Republic of Afghanistan					38,692
Belgium					26,531
Georgia					25,019
Turkmenistan					24,937
Kazakhstan					21,546
Ukraine					20,547
Austria					18,609
Kyrgyzstan					17,235
Libya					16,442
Moldova					13,472
Switzerland					13,453
China					12,426
Serbia and Montenegro					9,201
TOTAL	846,042	889,170	1,133,152	1,260,530	1,592,437

== Sources of immigration ==
=== Armenians ===
In 2010, there were between 22,000 and 25,000 Armenian citizens living illegally in Istanbul alone, according to Turkish officials.

=== Syrians ===
Refugees of the Syrian Civil War in Turkey are the Syrian refugees originated from Syrian Civil War, Turkey is hosting over 3.6 million (2019 number) "registered" refugees and delivered aid reaching $30 billion (total between 2011–2018) on refugee assistance. The large scale return to Syria uncertain (unending conflict), Turkey has focused on how to manage their presence, more registered refugees than any other country, in Turkish society by addressing their legal status, basic needs, employment, education, and impact on local communities.

== See also ==
- Republic of Turkey
- Turkish diaspora
- List of countries by immigrant population
- List of countries by foreign-born population
- List of sovereign states and dependent territories by fertility rate

== Bibliography ==
- Bercovici, Monica (2012). "La deuxième vie d'Ada-Kaleh ou Le potentiel culturel de la mémoire d'une île". In Roth, Klaus; Hayden, Robert (eds.). Migration In, From, And To Southeastern Europe: Historical and Cultural Aspects. LIT Verlag Münster. ISBN 978-3643108951.
- Çaǧatay, Soner (2006), Islam, Secularism, and Nationalism in Modern Turkey: Who is a Turk?, Taylor & Francis, ISBN 0415384583.
- Clark, Bruce (2007), Twice a Stranger: How Mass Expulsion Forged Modern Greece and Turkey, Granta, ISBN 978-1862079243.
- Corni, Gustavo; Stark, Tamás (2008), Peoples on the Move: Population Transfers and Ethnic Cleansing Policies during World War II and its Aftermath, Berg Press, ISBN 978-1845208240.
- Heper, Metin; Criss, Bilge (2009), Historical Dictionary of Turkey, Scarecrow Press, ISBN 978-0810860650.
- Karpat, Kemal H. (2004), "The Turks in America: Historical Background: From Ottoman to Turkish Immigration", Studies on Turkish Politics and Society: Selected Articles and Essays, BRILL, ISBN 90-04-13322-4.
- Nevzat, Altay (2005), Nationalism Amongst the Turks of Cyprus: The First wave (PDF), Oulu University Press, ISBN 9514277503, archived from the original (PDF) on 2016-03-03
- Poulton, Hugh (1997), "Islam, Ethnicity and State in the Contemporary Balkans", in Poulton, Hugh; Taji-Farouki, Suha (eds.), Muslim Identity and the Balkan State, C. Hurst & Co. Publishers, ISBN 1850652767.
- St. John-Jones, L.W. (1983). Population of Cyprus: Demographic Trends and Socio-economic Influences. Maurice Temple Smith Ltd. ISBN 0851172326.
- Whitman, Lois (1990). Destroying ethnic identity: the Turks of Greece. Human Rights Watch. ISBN 0-929692-70-5.
