= Presidency of Migration Management =

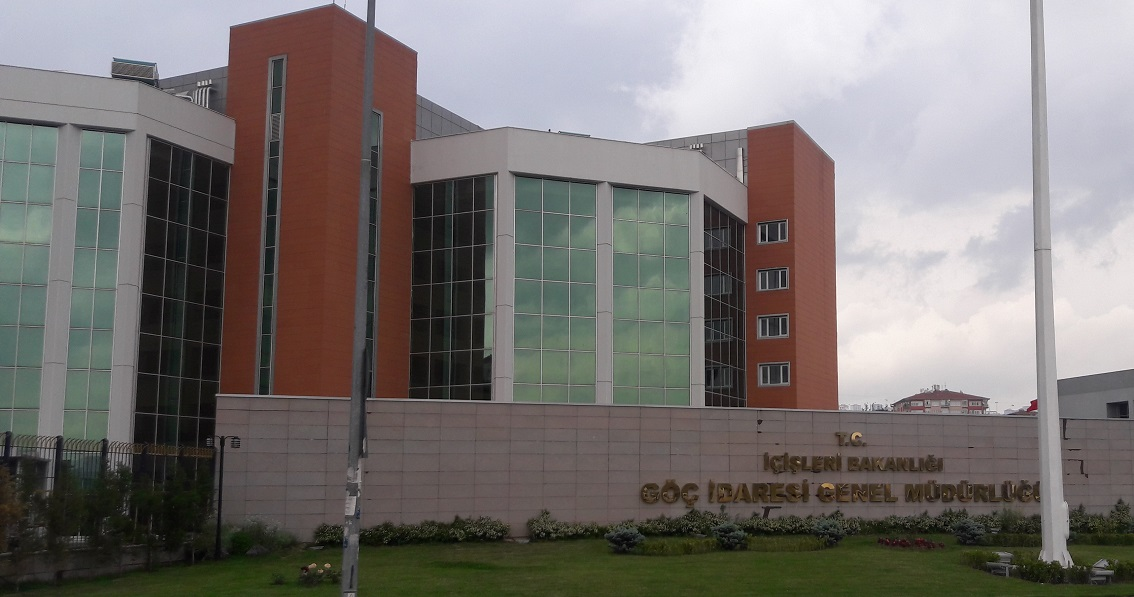
Directorate General of Migration Management building in Ankara.

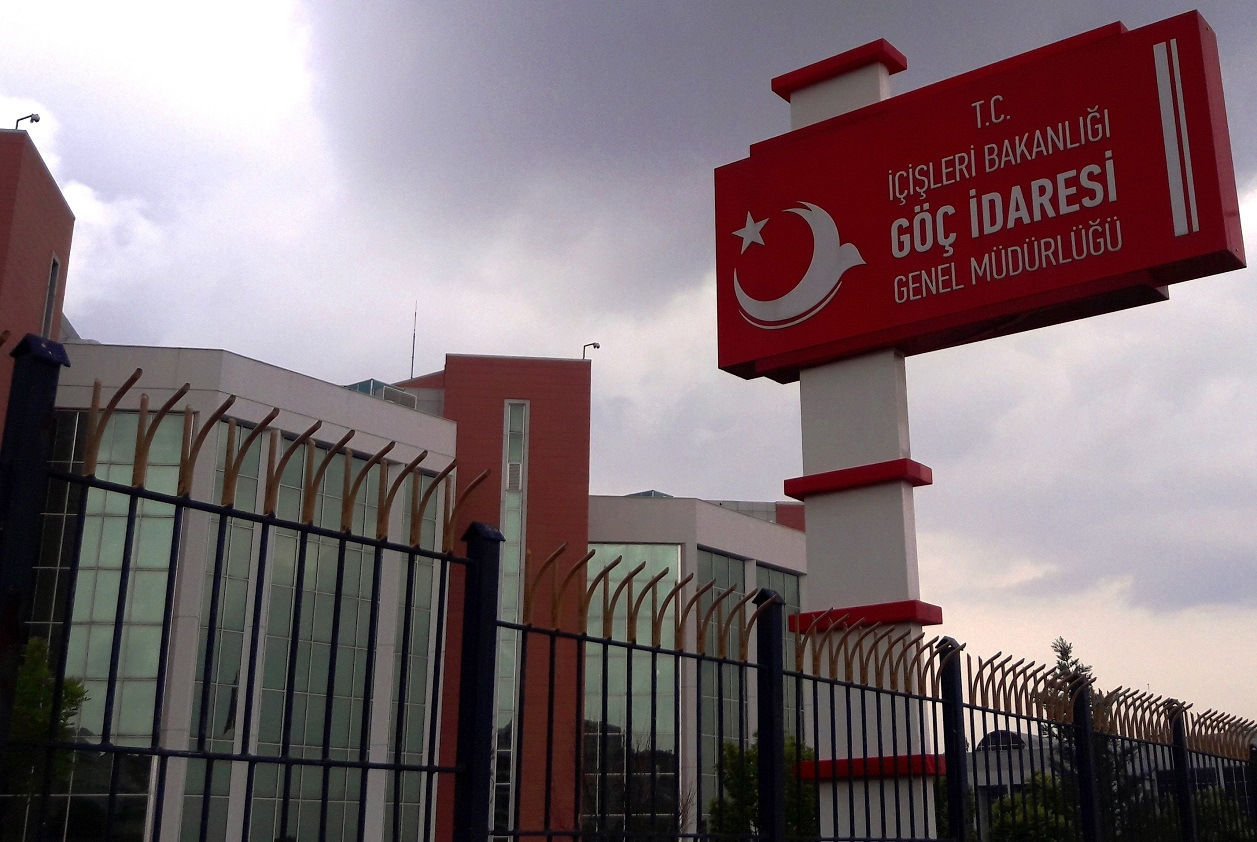
Entrance of the building.

Presidency of Migration Management (PMM) (Turkish: Göç İdaresi Başkanlığı) is the administrative, legislate and operational central-governmental authority responsible for overall migration and international protection affairs in Turkey. It is tasked with coordination of international labor, education, health, social policy and security. It cooperates very closely with relevant governmental institutions in diverse areas of migration.

The institution was established during Turkey's migrant crisis under the Ministry of the Interior. The preparations for the establishment began in 2008 as part of initiatives aimed at creating a civilian migration bureaucracy.

== Organization ==
=== Central Organization ===
- Combating Irregular Migration Department
- Department of the Protection of Victims of Human Trafficking
- Foreign Relations Department
- Foreigners Department
- Harmonization and Communication Department
- Information Technologies Department
- International Protection Department
- Migration Policies and Projects Department
- Office of Legal Counsellor
- Strategy Development Department
- Support Services Department
- The Head of Personnel Department
- Training Department

=== Local Organization ===
- 81 "Provincial Migration Management" directorates (in each province)

=== Overseas Organization ===
- Migration Counsellors
- Migration Attaches

== See also ==
- Immigration to Turkey
- Turkish migrant crisis
