= Ministry of Interior (Turkey) =

Government ministry of Turkey

Ministry of Interior of the Republic of Türkiye
- Türkiye Cumhuriyeti İçişleri Bakanlığı
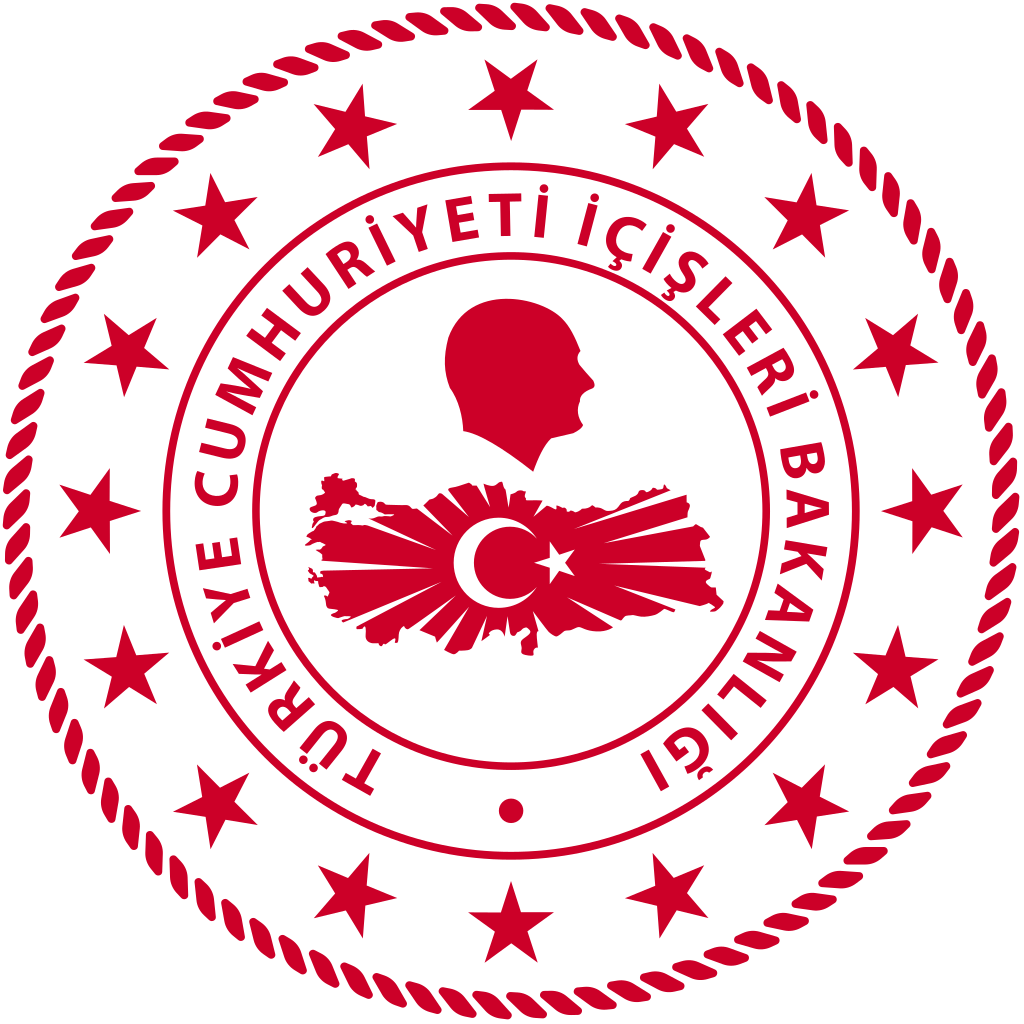

Agency overview
- Formed: 1920; 106 years ago
- Superseding agency: Ministry of the Interior (Ottoman Empire)
- Jurisdiction: Government of Turkey
- Headquarters: Ankara
- Annual budget: ₺88.800.089.000 (2024)
- Minister responsible: Mustafa Çiftçi
- Deputy Ministers responsible: Mehmet Aktaş; Bülent Turan; Mehmet Sağlam; Münir Karaloğlu
- Website: www.icisleri.gov.tr

The Ministry of Interior or Ministry of the Interior or Interior Ministry (Turkish: İçişleri Bakanlığı lit. Ministry of Internal Affairs) is a government ministry of the Republic of Turkey, responsible for interior security affairs in Turkey.

As of 10 February 2026, the current Minister of the Interior is Mustafa Çiftçi.

== Functions ==
The ministry is responsible for disaster and emergency management, immigration, inspection of local government, gendarmerie and coast guard (in peacetime), and police. The ministry helps to combat human trafficking, smuggling and bootleg alcohol.

== Organization ==
- Disaster and Emergency Management Presidency
- Coast Guard Command (in peacetime)
- Gendarmerie General Command (in peacetime)
- General Directorate of Security
- Presidency of Migration Management

== See also ==
- Ministry of the Interior (Ottoman Empire)
