= Temporary protection =

Temporary protection may refer to any of several legal statuses for refugees or displaced people:

- Temporary protected status in the United States
- Temporary Protection Directive in the European Union
- Temporary protection visa in Australia
- Law on Foreigners and International Protection and the Temporary Protection in Turkey
