= Automated Flagger Assistance Device =

Traffic control safety technology

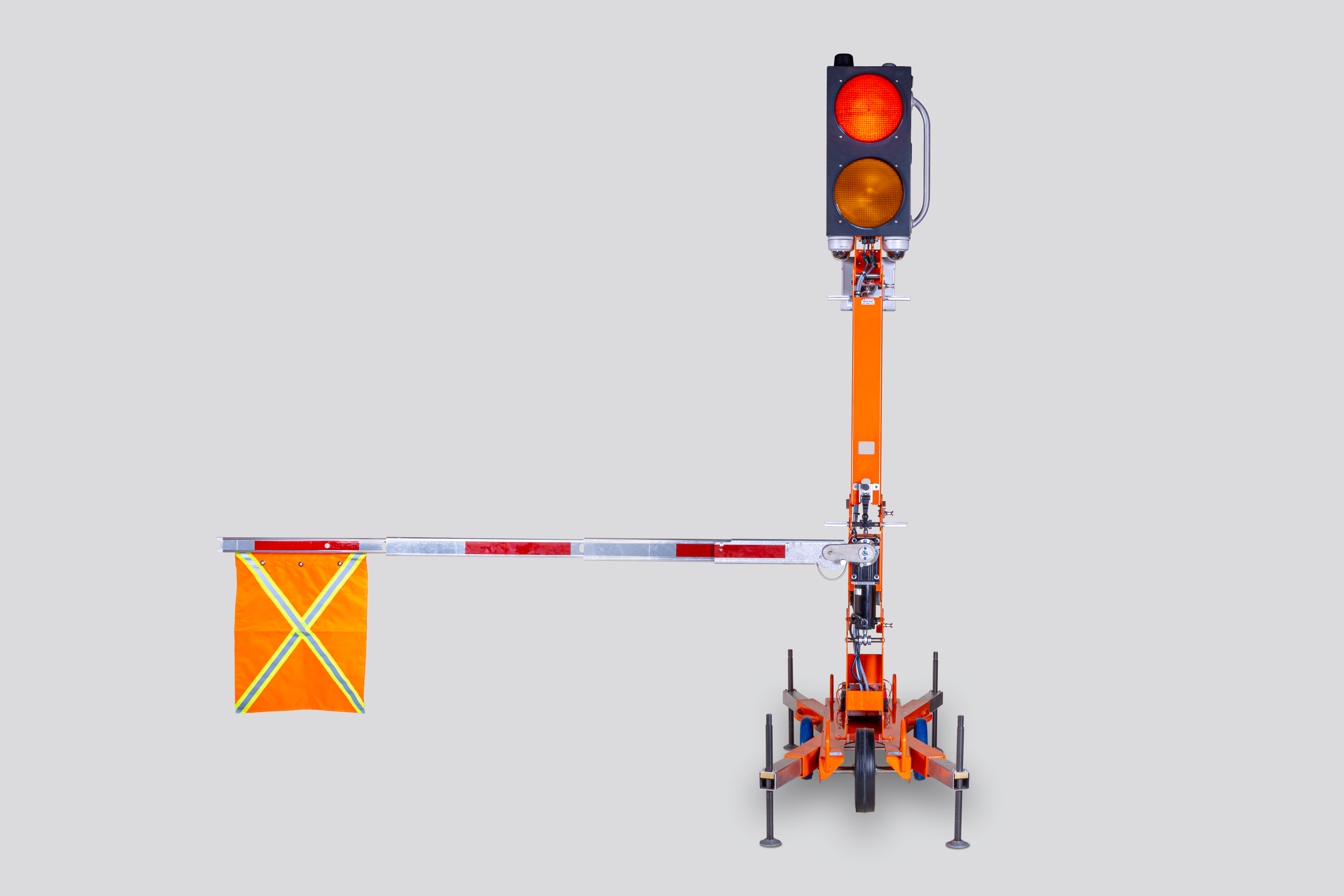
An Automated Flagger Assistance Device, The Guardian SmartFlagger.

Automated Flagger Assistance Device (AFAD) is a specialized piece of safety equipment used in the traffic control industry on roadway work zones. AFADs were designed as a solution to the dangers of traditional traffic control, aiming to increase the safety and efficiency of work zones. AFADs operate daily, short-term lane closure work zones and can work on a variety of job types including stationary jobs, intersections, mobile utility jobs, road construction jobs, among others. AFADs are intended to allow a single worker to control the job site off the road and out of direct traffic flow. However, AFADs are not a replacement for traditional traffic control flaggers; due to widespread regulations against fully automated traffic control, AFADs must be used in conjunction with human flaggers to ensure safe and effective traffic management. Improvements in AFAD technology has led to increased popularity in recent years.

== History ==
AFADs were first introduced in the early 1990s as a response to concerns about the safety of flaggers in roadwork zones. The initial models of AFADs were unreliable and prone to malfunctions, and were considered too bulky and difficult to maneuver, requiring multiple people and creating safety hazards on job sites. This led to criticism from some within the traffic control industry. However, the technology has improved over the years, and newer models are designed to be smaller, lighter, safer, and more efficient.

== Design ==
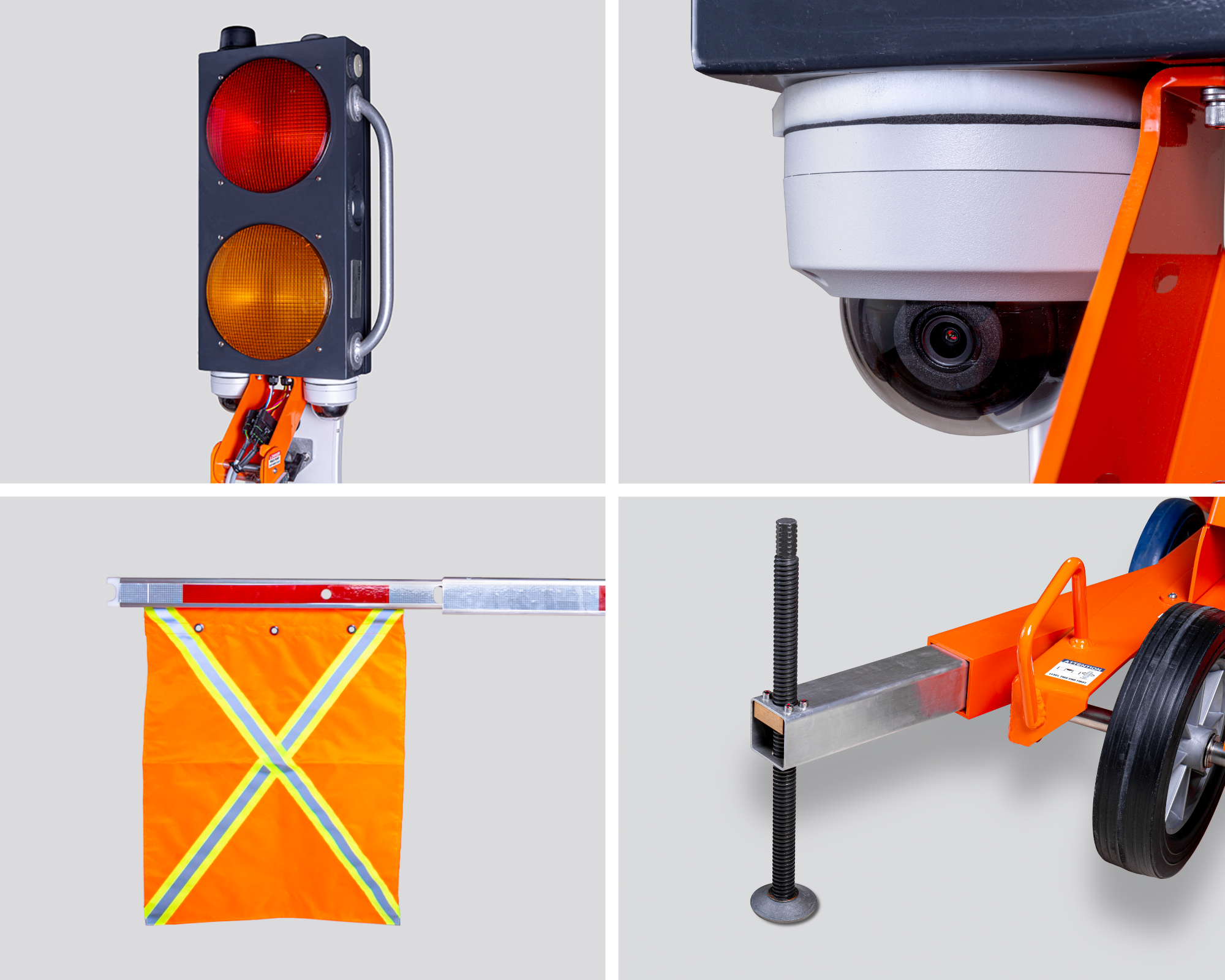
The components of an Automated Flagger Assistance Device (AFAD)

AFADs are compact and usually consist of high visibility signage, 12 inch red signal heads, automated flags, and a remote control; newer AFADs also come equipped with cameras and a tablet interface.

== Safety considerations ==
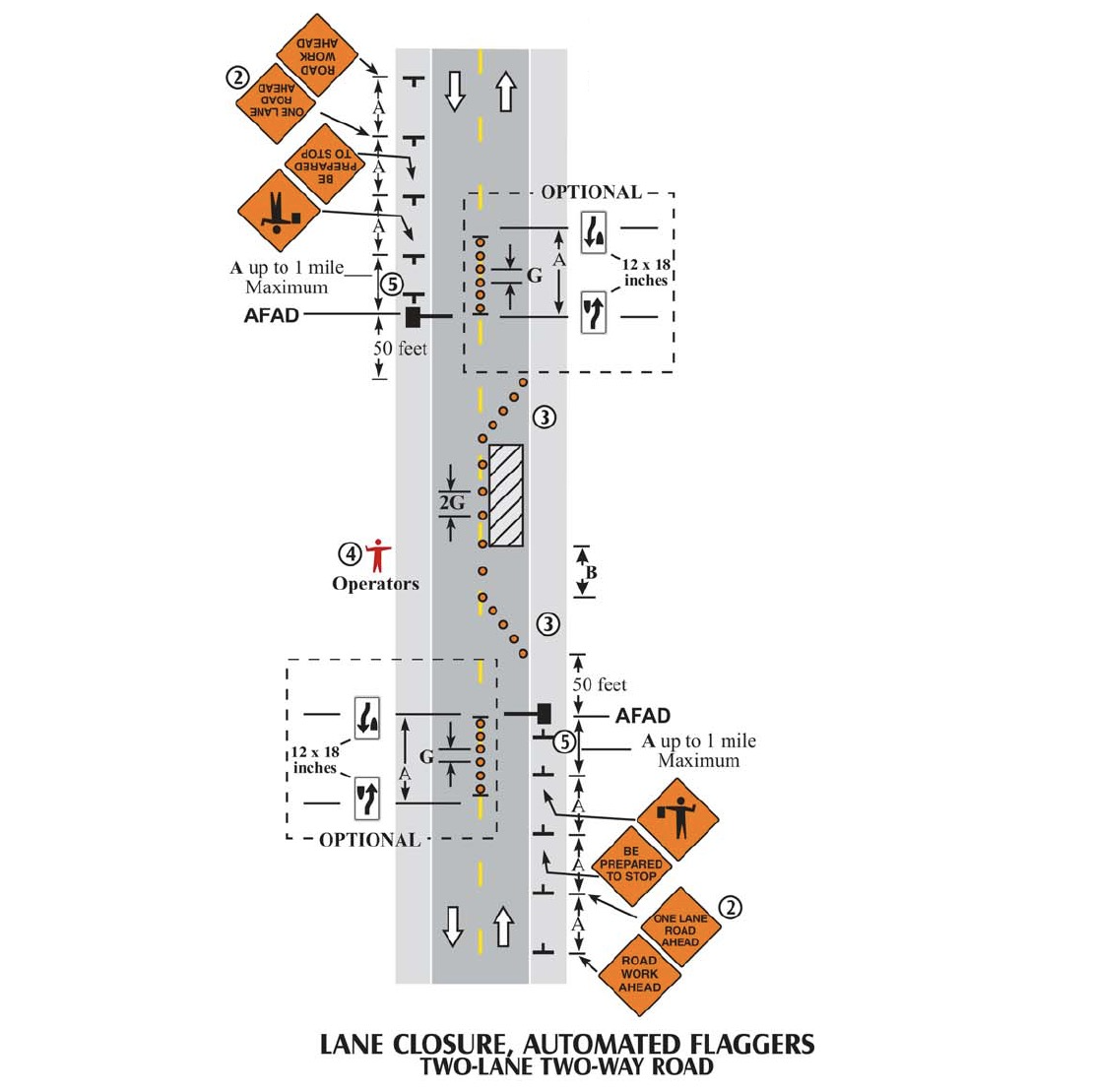
Standard AFAD setup—Two-lane, two-way road

In 2020, work zone fatalities hit a 16-year high in the United States, with an estimated 102,000 work zone crashes resulting in over 45,000 injuries and 857 fatalities, representing a 45% increase in work zone fatalities between 2013 and 2020. Economic costs of work zone crashes have been estimated at over $17.5 billion annually. The AFAD allows the flagger to work outside of the direct flow of traffic. This reduces the risk of accidents and injuries to both workers and drivers. An AFAD is visible from a distance, ensuring that drivers are aware of the work zone and can slow down accordingly. The automated gate arm provides additional safety by stopping traffic in one direction while allowing traffic in the other direction to proceed.

A 2018 study at the University of Missouri-Columbia concluded that the use of AFADs could significantly improve work zone safety. A study by the Minnesota Department of Transportation concluded that AFADs may enhance safety over the human flagger based on a reduced vehicle approach speed, farther full stop location, and lower intrusion rate. The same study concluded that the public had a favorable impression of the AFAD and generally preferred it over the human flagger.

== Development ==
Modern AFADs allow operators to use a tablet to monitor and control traffic. By analyzing traffic patterns, AFADs can intelligently redirect a portion of traffic, reducing congestion and enhancing safety within the construction zone.
