= Öncüpınar Accommodation Facility =

Refugee camp in Kilis Province

Coordinates: 36°38′49″N 37°04′59″E

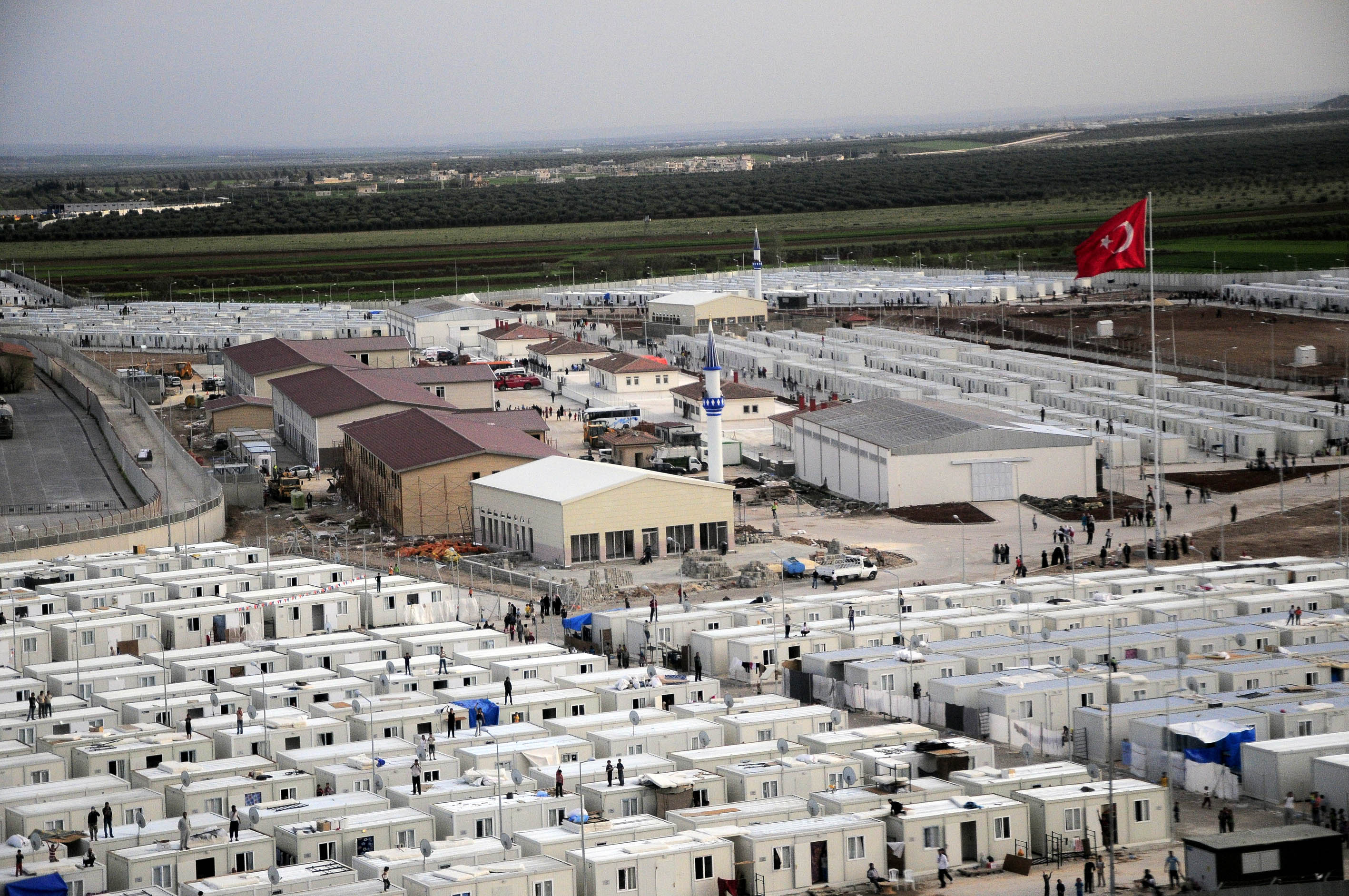
Kilis refugee camp

Öncüpınar Accommodation Facility was a refugee camp for refugees fleeing the Syrian Civil War located in Öncüpınar village in Kilis, Turkey, near the Syrian border. The camp opened in 2012 and closed in 2019. As of February 2014, it hosted 14,000 people.

The camp consisted of 2,053 containers, linked with brick paths. Several schools, kindergartens and playgrounds served the camp's 2,000 school children. The camp was fully operated by the Turkish Disaster and Emergency Management Presidency committee.

Kilis was one of the six "container camps" opened by Turkey, which sought to offer a higher life quality than traditional tent camps.

Each refugee family received a total of $43 per person monthly via a "food card" system, which could be spent in the various shops operating in the camp.

The camp closed in 2019 and the remaining refugees were to be sent to another camp in Elbeyli District.
