= Disaster and Emergency Management Presidency =

Governmental emergency agency in Turkey

- Afet ve Acil Durum Yönetimi Başkanlığı (AFAD)

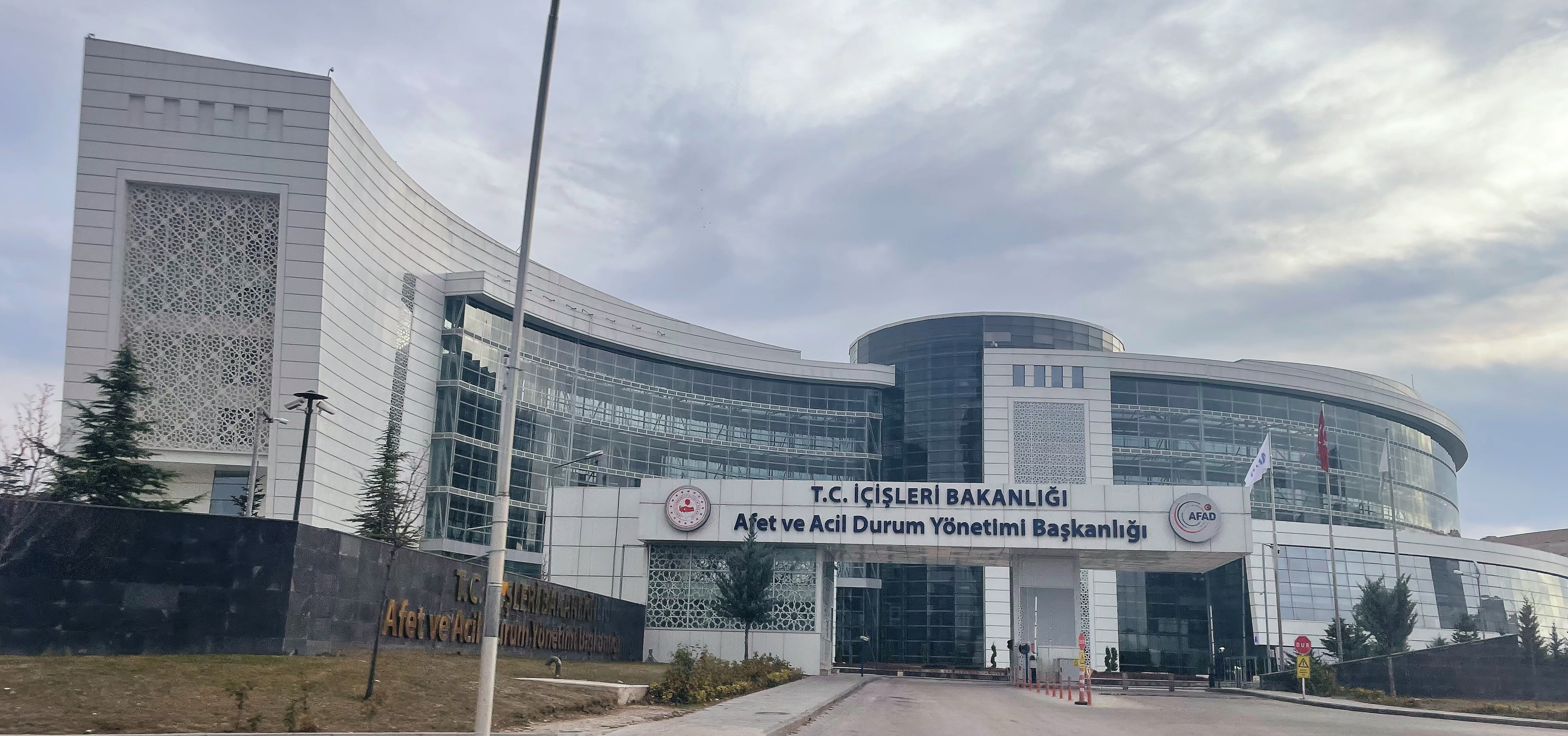

Agency overview
- Formed: 2009
- Preceding agency: General Directorate of Civil Defence
- Jurisdiction: Government of Turkey
- Headquarters: Dumlupinar Bulvari No. 159 / Çankaya / Ankara
- Annual budget: ₺993.414.000
- Agency executive: Okay Memiş, Director of AFAD
- Website: www.afad.gov.tr

The Disaster and Emergency Management Presidency (Turkish: Afet ve Acil Durum Yönetimi Başkanlığı, also abbreviated as AFAD), also known as the Disaster and Emergency Management Authority, is a governmental disaster management agency operating under the Turkish Ministry of Interior. The organisation was established in 2009 to take necessary measures for effective emergency management and civil protection nationwide in Turkey. The presidency conducts pre-incident work, such as preparedness, mitigation and risk management, during-incident work such as response, and post-incident work such as recovery and reconstruction. AFAD reports to the Turkish Ministry of Interior.

Amongst the governmental, NGO and private institutions, the presidency provides coordination, formulates policies and implements policies.

In a disaster and emergency, the AFAD is the sole responsible state-run organization.

== History ==
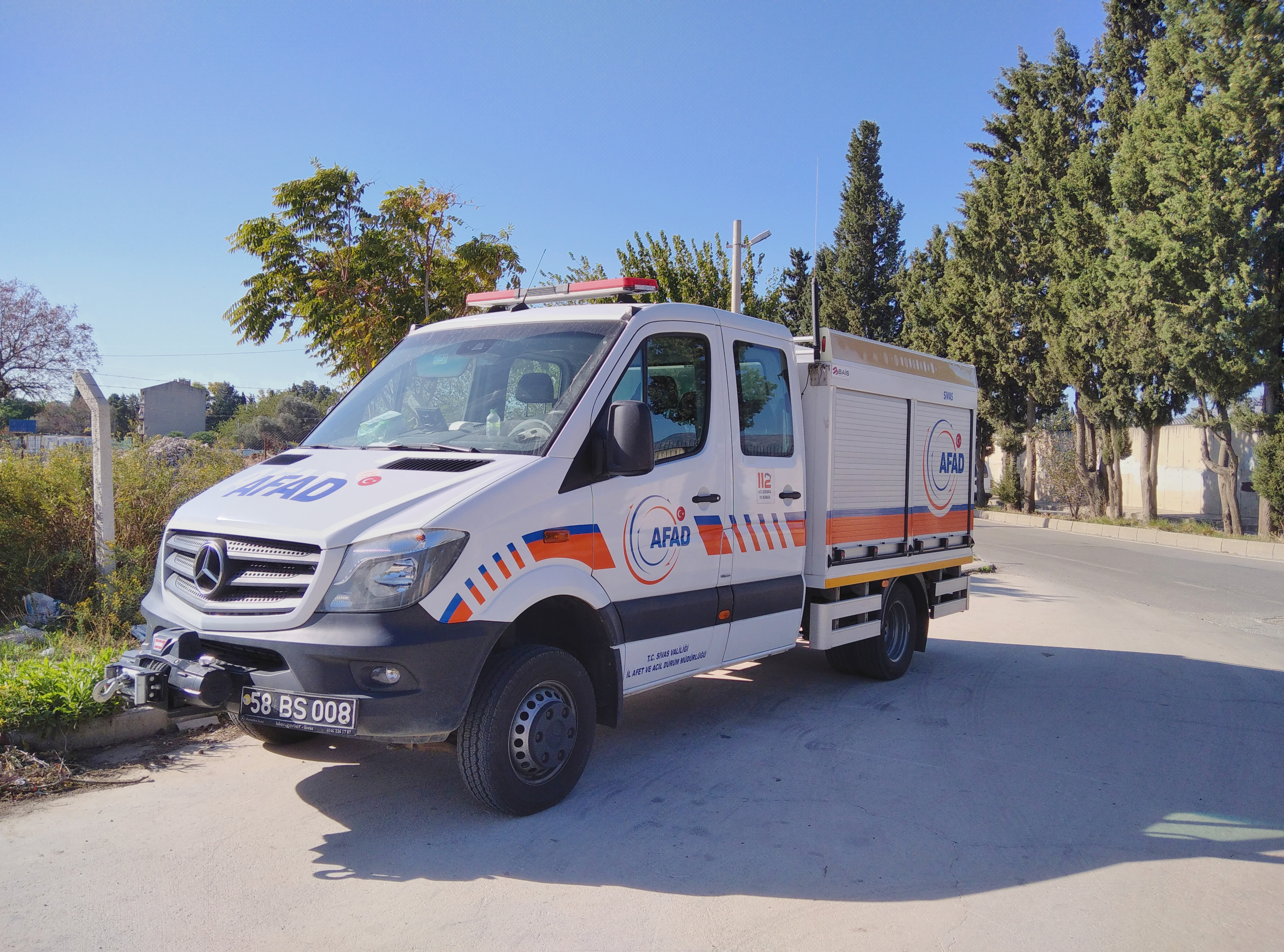
An AFAD rescue vehicle

Two consecutive major earthquakes in 1999, the 1999 İzmit earthquake and the 1999 Düzce earthquake, became a turning point in disaster management in Turkey. These earthquakes put pre-disaster planning and preparation on the agenda of the government and the general population of the country.

At that time, Turkey's Disaster Management System was mainly focused on the post-disaster period, and there were no incentives or legislation to encourage risk analysis or risk reduction approaches before earthquakes occur. Both the academic and the technical authorities agreed that the country had a pressing need to develop pre-disaster precautions, and that would require both updated legislation and administrative restructuring.

The AFAD was established in 2009 during the Government of Recep Tayyip Erdoğan. By the Act No. 5902 dated May 29, 2009 and Establishment of Disaster and Emergency Management Presidency; General Directorate of Turkey Emergency Management under Prime Ministry, General Directorate of Civil Defence under Ministry of Interior, General Directorate of Disaster Affairs under Ministry of Public Works and Settlement were closed. Three institutions unified under a single independent authority with the act adopted by the Parliament and entered into force in June, 2009. The new institution was named Afet ve Acil Durum Yönetimi Başkanlığı (Prime Ministry Disaster and Emergency Management Presidency) or AFAD.

After the 2017 constitutional referendum and the subsequent 2018 presidential election AFAD started to operate under the Turkish Ministry of Interior. In 2018, the institution was involved in the established of nine schools in the Syrian territory occupied by Turkey. Following the 2023 Turkey–Syria earthquake, the AFAD was involved in rescuing the affected population.

== Administration ==
AFAD is made of four councils: Disaster and Emergency Supreme Council Disaster and Emergency Coordination Committee Earthquake Advisory Council Chemical, biological, radiological and nuclear defense Council.

=== Service units ===
- Planning and Harm Reduction Department
- Intervention Department
- Improvement Department
- Civil Defense Department
- Earthquake Department Directorate
- Personnel and Support Services Department
- Information Systems and Communication Department
- Strategy Development Department
- Volunteer and Donor Relations Department
- Foreign Affairs and International Humanitarian Aid Department
- Education Department
- CBRN defense Department

№	Director	Beginning of Duty	Completion of Task
1	Hasan IPEK	16 July 2009	2 January 2010
2	Mehmet Ersoy	2 January 2010	9 March 2011
3	İbrahim Ejder Kaya (vekil)	10 March 2011	2 January 2012
4	Fuat Oktay	2 January 2012	18 June 2016
5	Mehmet Halis Bilden	29 June 2016	5 August 2017
6	Mehmet Güllüoğlu	5 August 2017	11 September 2021
7	Yunus Sezer	11 September 2021	16 August 2023
8	Okay Memiş	16 August 2023	4 February 2025
9	Ali Hamza Pehlivan	10 February 2025	Incumbent

== Operations ==
=== Kilis refugee camp ===
The Killis refugee camp, run by the Disaster and Emergency Management Presidency, featured in a 13 February 2014 article in The New York Times titled "How to Build a Perfect Refugee Camp". The camp is staffed by Turkish government employees, rather than by NGOs. It is hoped that the 14,000 refugees of the Syrian Civil War benefiting from the clean, well organized facility will eventually "go home and become grand ambassadors of Turkey."

=== Mohamed Morsi orphanage ===
In October 2020, more than a year after the death of deposed Egyptian president Mohamed Morsi, Turkish aid agencies established the "Mohamed Morsi Orphanage" in Idlib, Syria. The Disaster and Emergency Management Presidency opened the orphanage in Idlib's Mashhad Rouhin district, in collaboration with Ozgur-Deir and Fetihder Associations. It was to house orphaned children and their families in the city.

== Criticism ==
=== 2023 earthquake ===
AFAD has been criticized on the grounds of claimed slowness to react and inadequate help during the first days of the 2023 Turkey–Syria earthquake. Emergency management academic Kubilay Kaptan stated that the delayed reaction of AFAD was mainly caused by the increasing centralization of Turkish emergency response agencies under the current government. According to Kaptan numerous relief agencies had been merged into AFAD in the past years and since the implementation of the referandum AFAD had become part of the Ministry of Interior, losing its autonomy and self-governance. According to Kaptan the Ministry of Interior making the decisions hindered a fast relief response since the organisation need to get an approval for its actions, contrasting more independent agencies like FEMA.

=== Unqualified staff and nepotism claims ===
AFAD has been criticized on the claims of inappropriate board of management, since some members of the board do not have any disaster management background. İsmail Palakoğlu, the general manager of disaster response subdivision of AFAD being a theologian who previously worked at the Directorate of Religious Affairs was criticized by several politicians and media outlets. Some of the provincial presidents of AFAD such as Necati Oruk (Ağrı), Bayram Şahin (Balıkesir), Adil Arslan (Bayburt), Resul Karadeniz (Hakkari), Mehmet Emin Koçan (Kocaeli) and Recep Erol (Tekirdağ) being graduates of imam hatip religious Islamic schools were also criticised.

AFAD has been criticised for claimed nepotism in its managing positions. A significant part of the AFAD's key positions on the provincial level were given to relatives of several AKP politicians, such as Süleyman Soylu, Murat Kurum, Ahmet Minder and Ahmet Aydın.

== See also ==
- Directorate-General for European Civil Protection and Humanitarian Aid Operations
- AKUT Search and Rescue Association
