= Almondbury Community School bullying incident =

2018 incident in England

- Date: 25 October 2018
- Location: Huddersfield, West Yorkshire, England

A sixteen-year-old youth was shown on video assaulting a fifteen-year-old Syrian refugee boy in a playground attack in Almondbury, Huddersfield, West Yorkshire, England. The attack took place at Almondbury Community School on 25 October 2018; the headmaster condemned the attack once it had received nationwide media attention.

On 22 July 2021 Tommy Robinson, activist and founder of English Defence League, was found to have libelled the Syrian boy and was ordered to pay £100,000 plus legal costs, which were understood to amount to a further £500,000. An injunction was also granted to stop Robinson from repeating the libel. After breaching that injunction, Robinson was sentenced to 18 months in prison in October 2024.

== Assaults on Syrian refugees ==
The clip shows the victim, with his arm in a cast, being dragged to the floor by his neck as his attacker says "I'll drown you" and "what are you saying now" on a school playing field, while forcing water from a bottle into the victim's mouth. The video was filmed in a lunch break. The clip shows the victim walking away, without reacting, as the attacker and others can be heard continuing to verbally abuse him.

The victim, a Syrian refugee, had previously suffered a broken wrist; this had also been investigated by the police, who had interviewed three youths but took no further action. No further action was taken "as the evidential test required to prosecute was not met". Subsequently, a separate video emerged of a girl, reportedly the younger sister of the Syrian refugee, also being assaulted in the school playground. Previously a girl forcibly removed the girl's hijab; the attacker was excluded from the school over the incident.

Director of Advocacy at the Refugee Council, Lisa Doyle said: "The idea that someone escapes war and brutality, only to be met with violence here, is truly awful." The headmaster condemned the attack once it had received nationwide media attention.

=== Victim ===
The victim, originally from Homs, had spent nearly half his life as a refugee in Lebanon before being resettled by the British government in Huddersfield. Jamal said bullying at Almondbury Community School had only increased since footage of the October attack went viral and had escalated into threats at his home.

==== Previous pleas for assistance ====
Huddersfield MP, Barry Sheerman, said that the 15-year-old victim came to his office in late October asking for help: "The young man himself turned up at my office and told me he was being bullied and appealed for my help". Sheerman reported the allegations to Jacqui Gedman, the leader of Kirklees Council and to Steve Walker, the Head of Children's Services.

Almondbury's Conservative councillor, Bernard McGuin, revealed Jamal wrote to authorities in a desperate plea for help three weeks before the filmed attack. In the email entitled "complaint: please help me", the youngster said he had been subjected to bullying since he joined the school two years ago in year 9 and listed "incidents and allegations" at the school. McGuin contacted safeguarding officers at the local authority and said: "The school only took action when authority figures got involved" – this has been denied by the Headmaster, Trevor Bowen.

=== Suspect ===
A 16-year-old boy was interviewed by West Yorkshire Police, and reported for summons for an offence of assault.

The suspect had shared numerous posts from far-right social media accounts. The suspect's mother had previously been prosecuted over racist behaviour. The mother's case reached court in November 2017, where she admitted racially aggravated threatening behaviour and was fined. The mother had been quizzed over a second suspected racist attack after calling a chip shop owner a 'terrorist' in July 2018. The suspect's brother was jailed after a far-right Britain First rally erupted in violence and served a 32-month sentence for a public order offence. The suspect's brother, a Huddersfield Town fan, was subsequently jailed for 20 weeks and banned from all football for 8 years for an unprovoked attack on a FC Halifax Town supporter.

Tommy Robinson, activist and founder of English Defence League, interviewed the 16-year-old suspect following the incident. Robinson, may have breached court orders preventing the naming of the alleged perpetrator in several videos on Facebook and Instagram, including one that has been viewed more than 150,000 times. The former Chief Prosecutor for the north-west, Nazir Afzal contacted the police and said that posting material naming the boy was unlawful.

=== Aftermath ===
On 27 November 2018, protesters took part in a peaceful demonstration outside the school, organised by the Huddersfield Pakistani Community Alliance. The victim, identified as Jamal, told The Guardian that he and his sister did not wish to return to school, and a solicitor representing the family indicated they were considering moving away from the area.

Jamal said: "I cannot go to my school anymore and there are people who hang around outside my house and video me on their phones. They call me 'little rat' if I go outside. One of my neighbours threatened me outside my house just yesterday."

Jamal asked people not to attack his alleged bully, and said that he was alarmed by the violent threats being made online towards the alleged attacker.

In February 2019, it was reported that owing to continued xenophobic threats against Jamal's family and against other Syrian families in Huddersfield, and a failure to protect the families against these threats, Jamal's family decided to leave the area for their own safety.

A fundraising page for the victim's family had received more than £150,000. More than 100,000 people signed a petition calling on the Prime Minister to launch an inquiry into rising hate crime and racist bullying in British schools following the incident.

Home Secretary, Sajid Javid, said he had initially written a personal note to Jamal, and later met with him and his family. Javid said he was victim of racist bullying at school and that seeing the video brought back memories. MP Tobias Ellwood was among those to share the footage, writing online: "Absolute disgrace – Please retweet. This bully, his parents, the school where this occurs and the onlookers who fail to step in, all have big questions to answer".

==== Ofsted inspection ====
The school faced an emergency inspection by Ofsted when Government inspectors made an unannounced visit on 6 December 2018. Amanda Spielman, Chief Inspector of Schools, said she was "appalled" by the video and had received complaints over it. Cathy Kirby, Ofsted North East and Yorkshire and Humber Director, said: "We take the safety of pupils very seriously. Where there are concerns about a school’s ability to safeguard pupils, we will not hesitate to inspect".

The school had an Ofsted monitoring visit in September 2018, and a previous inspection of the school in June 2017 had found that it required improvement.

=== False claims ===
Tommy Robinson used photos taken from a 2017 article about a teenage cancer patient from Surrey to claim incorrectly that the Syrian refugee had previously attacked two schoolgirls. Hours after spreading the claims during two Facebook live broadcasts, Robinson admitted to his followers that he had helped spread fake news. Saying that he had been duped, he said: "I have been completely had, how embarrassing man". The mother of a girl who had been alleged to have been attacked, posted to Robinson's Facebook page that Jamal was not the attacker.

==== Legal action against Tommy Robinson ====
The Syrian refugee family's lawyers, Farooq Bajwa & Co, issued a letter to Robinson stating "We wish to place you on notice that our client intends to pursue legal action against you in respect of these contents of these publications and you will shortly be receiving formal pre-action correspondence in this respect". CNN International reported Robinson had deleted the videos and admitted to posting a fake photograph falsely purporting to show violence by a Muslim gang.

Robinson's supporters said that the letter warning about legal action "blocked" free speech. The lawyer responded by stating that Robinson "is being held to account for lying about a child" and "thinks it is a good idea to defame this 15-year-old boy and accuse him of being the author of his own bullying. It is actually sickening."

==== Legal action against Facebook ====
Facebook protects prominent figures such as Robinson from normal rules of moderation that would usually see a page removed after posting content that violates its rules. Solicitors have suggested that Facebook was therefore responsible for Robinson's posts and had given him "special treatment [that] seems to be financially driven."

=== Libel trial ===
On 21 April 2021, the libel trial Hijazi v Yaxley-Lennon started at Royal Courts of Justice in London. Robinson (real name Yaxley-Lennon) chose to represent himself. Catrin Evans QC, representing Jamal Hijazi, told the court that Robinson's comments "turned Jamal into the aggressor, and the bully into a righteous white knight". The trial heard evidence from former pupils, all five of whom supported the defendant Lennon; the judge disbelieved them.

On 22 July 2021, Robinson was found to have libelled the boy and was ordered to pay £100,000 plus legal costs, which are understood to amount to a further £500,000. An injunction was also granted to stop Robinson from repeating the libel. Robinson, who represented himself during the four-day trial, said he was "gobsmacked" by the costs the boy's lawyers were claiming, which he said included £70,000 for taking witness statements. He added: "I’ve not got any money. I’m bankrupt. I’ve struggled hugely with my own issues these last 12 months … I ain’t got it."

In May 2023, Robinson's film Silenced was released. In the film, he repeats his defamatory claims about the boy. He depicts the incident and the resulting fallout as a "story about how the law is being manipulated and exploited by the far left and Islamists to destroy the lives of anyone who speaks out against the so-called progressive, so-called liberal narrative." Sam Doak of Logically Facts wrote that the film's release "invites potential legal jeopardy". Robinson was due to appear at a High Court hearing on 29 July 2024 after being accused of contempt of court for making the film, but instead fled the country. An arrest warrant was issued after he left the country, to be enacted in October should he fail to appear at a follow-up hearing. Ahead of that hearing on 28 October 2024 at Woolwich Crown Court, Robinson was held in custody after handing himself in to Folkestone police station on 25 October. In court, Robinson admitted contempt of court by repeating false allegations about a Syrian refugee. He was sentenced to 18 months in prison.

In April 2025, Robinson lost an appeal against his 18-month prison sentence for contempt of court. He was expected to be released on licence in July 2025. However, in May 2025, the High Court reduced his sentence by four months on the basis that he had given an assurance that he would comply with the injunction in future. As a result, he was released from HM Prison Woodhill in Milton Keynes on 27 May 2025.

== Other incidents ==
In November 2018, a third video emerged which showed an assault of a young girl that was filmed by pupils in what appears to be a pre-arranged fight. It shows youngsters at the school gathered round on the driveway beside the playing fields, encouraging two girls to fight.
