= Nazir Afzal =

British solicitor (born 1962)

Nazir Afzal OBE
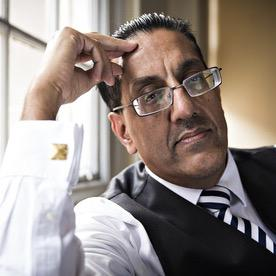
- Afzal in 2016
- Born: 1 October 1962 (age 64); Birmingham, England
- Education: University of Birmingham; University of Law
- Occupation: Solicitor
- Employer(s): University of Manchester; Hopwood Hall College; Crown Prosecution Service
- Children: 4
- Website: www.nazirafzal.co.uk

Nazir Afzal OBE (born 1 October 1962) is a British solicitor and former prosecutor within the Crown Prosecution Service (CPS).

Afzal spent most of his career in the CPS, rising to be Chief Crown Prosecutor for North West England in 2011, a role he held until leaving the CPS in 2015. In April 2016, he was appointed chief executive of the Association of Police and Crime Commissioners; he resigned immediately after the May 2017 Manchester Arena bombing so that he could comment freely on the attack. He was appointed chancellor of the University of Manchester in 2022, succeeding Lemn Sissay on August 1.

In October 2017, he became a member of the Independent Press Standards Organisation (IPSO) Complaints Committee. In 2018, he became the Chair of the Corporation Board at Hopwood Hall College in Rochdale, Greater Manchester.

== Early life and education ==
Afzal was born in Birmingham, his parents having emigrated from Pakistan. His father and his father's family worked for generations in catering for the British Army and one of his relatives was murdered by the Provisional Irish Republican Army (IRA) in Northern Ireland during the Troubles. One of seven children, his family is of Pashtun ethnicity.

He grew up as one of seven siblings in a two-up two-down in Small Heath. He was bullied and racially abused throughout his childhood; those around him saw no point in reporting the incidents to the police. Following a racially motivated attack, aged 13, his father told him "The Police are not interested in you [...] there is no justice". Afzal states that with this incident came the realisation that racism "wasn't something I had to put up with. And I certainly wasn't going to spend the rest of my life running from abusers".

Afzal obtained his law degree from the University of Birmingham before attending The College of Law in Guildford, where he developed his interest in criminal law.

== Career ==
=== Early career ===
Afzal worked as a solicitor in Birmingham from 1988 until moving to London in 1991, where he became a Crown Prosecutor.

The first time one of Afzal's cases reached the national news was in August 1992, when the culprits were two supermarket employees who, following a works trip to the seaside, had sex in a crowded train back to London, and then lit up cigarettes in a no-smoking carriage. Afzal successfully prosecuted them for committing an indecent act and for smoking where not permitted to do so. This case was cited by an American academic in attempting to understand the British culture of tact.

Another notable prosecution in his early career was that of serial killer Colin Ireland.

In 2001, he became the youngest person, and first Muslim, to be appointed as assistant Chief Crown Prosecutor.

=== Chief Crown Prosecutor ===
In 2011, he was appointed North West Chief Crown Prosecutor covering Greater Manchester, Cumbria and Lancashire. At that point in his career, he made it clear that prosecutors are public figures and should be out there engaging with the people, explaining themselves via the media." As one of the 13 chief crown prosecutors that cover England and Wales, he was responsible for over 100,000 prosecutions a year and managed 800 lawyers and paralegals.

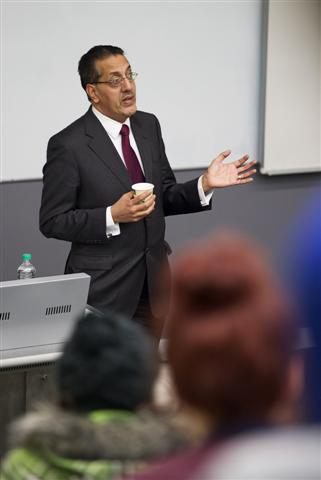
Afzal addressing law students at Salford University in 2012

When he was promoted and moved to Manchester in 2011 he faced several high-profile cases, one involving a man killed while committing an aggravated burglary in which Afzal decided that the householder acted in reasonable self-defence. Afzal's team were responsible for the swift prosecution of that summer's looters, a judicial response described by an academic as "shock and awe". The Stepping Hill Hospital poisoning incident occurred that autumn, and 2011 closed with the unprovoked murder of a student from India. In 2012 he successfully prosecuted Dale Cregan, who was convicted of four murders (including that of two police officers) and three attempted murders, for which he was sentenced to a whole life order.

==== Violence, control, and gender ====
Afzal is best known for tackling cases involving violence against women and the sexual exploitation of children; the New York Times called him "Britain’s go-to prosecutor" for these areas. Until 2004, he had not been aware of forced marriages and honour crimes happening in the UK, but he was approached by a group of women with compelling testimony. They asked him to use his position to investigate, so he held a conference on the issues and set up a national database, cataloguing dozens of instances of potential crimes. 2005 saw the "honour" killing of Samaira Nazir by her brother and cousin; as area director for the CPS, Afzal was responsible for the prosecution of her relatives, and described the beliefs that led to her murder as "tragic and outdated". He thought that such traditional attitudes would die out with the older immigrant generation, but by 2008, by which time he was the CPS's lead on honour-based violence, he realised that young men held the same controlling beliefs about "family honour" and "purity", and that education needed to start with primary school children to challenge this. "I have talked to loads of Muslim women and I can tell you that the greatest fear they have is not Islamophobia or being attacked by racists or being arrested on suspicion of terrorism. It is from within their own family."

One of his first decisions on becoming a chief crown prosecutor was to initiate prosecutions in the case of the Rochdale child sex abuse ring, overturning an earlier decision by the CPS. He suggested that "white professionals' over-sensitivity to political correctness and fear of appearing racist may well have contributed to justice being stalled". He said "I do feel that there's a deficit of leadership in some parts of the Muslim community. They could be much more challenging of certain behaviours". He attributed the attacks to "evil men", saying that the key driver was "male power". A New York Times profile said:

Being a man, a practising Muslim and the son of immigrants from the conservative tribal area in northwestern Pakistan might make Mr. Afzal an unlikely feminist in the eyes of some. But that is how he describes himself — and his gender, he said, is by far his biggest asset. "Women have been talking about these issues for a long time," he said. "I'm not the first person to take up this fight in this country, I’m just the first man, and that makes it a lot easier. I come from these communities. I understand their patriarchal nature. I can challenge them," he continued. "And because I am a man, the men in the community are more likely to listen to me."

Afzal's work against grooming gangs led to criticism from "members of the Asian community" and a campaign by the far right to have him sacked and deported. Despite his actions being the catalyst for the successful prosecution of the Rochdale child sex abuse ring, he was targeted by the English Defence League and door-stepped by Nick Griffin, causing him to need police protection. Regarding far-right campaigns to deport Afzal, he reiterated "I was born in Birmingham. They can deport me to Birmingham if they want to", and said "I think if you are getting it from both sides, you are probably getting something right."

He used his position to stress that abusers were found in all communities, and that the vast majority of paedophiles in Britain are white. In May 2013, he was responsible for the prosecution of former BBC presenter Stuart Hall, who was convicted of multiple sexual offences against girls and women. He promised to turn the attention of the CPS to forced marriage in the Traveller community, which he claimed was rife. Afzal put forward the theory, also proposed by Rochdale's then-MP Simon Danczuk, that one explanation for the profile of the town's abusers was the prevalence of Pakistani-origin men in the night-time economy, i.e. as taxi drivers and workers in take-away shops.

=== After the CPS ===
In March 2015, it was reported that Afzal was leaving the CPS. A CPS spokesman said "Nazir Afzal is leaving the service as part of [an] on-going drive for efficiency" and that "there has been no impropriety on the part of Mr Afzal".

Once he left the CPS, Afzal began to speak even more widely, and found a large audience for his messages, that violence against women infects all communities, that authorities are still unwilling to believe the victims, and that there is a deficit of leadership in the British Muslim community. "Having prosecuted perpetrators from more than 60 countries and [dealt with] victims from more than 50 countries, I know there isn't any community where women and girls are safe. It's a power thing and power sadly infects every community and therefore our responsibility has to begin with listening to victims and survivors." He draws parallels between the way gangs groom children for sexual exploitation and the way Islamists lure young people into radicalisation. Both prey on young people who feel unwanted, unloved and are more likely to be open to manipulation, Afzal argued. He explained that strategies to target radicalisation had to appeal more to young people and called for more community-led efforts to combat the forces of radicalisation.

Afzal became chief executive of the Association of Police and Crime Commissioners in 2016. He resigned from this post, which restricted his political expression, immediately after the Manchester Arena bombing in May 2017 in order to express his views on the topical BBC television programme Question Time.

In 2017 he joined the Complaints Committee of the Independent Press Standards Organisation as its first BAME member. In January 2018 he was appointed, alongside Yasmin Khan of the Halo Project, as an advisor to the Welsh government on issues around violence against women, promising "to make Wales one of the safest places in Europe to be a woman." He often speaks and writes about how much depends on the undervalued leadership of women in small charities, working to combat gender-based problems and extremism in their own communities.

In September 2018, he became Chair of the Corporation Board of Hopwood Hall College. Previous education positions included a Pro-Vice Chancellorship of the University of West London. He is Honorary Lecturer in law at University of Manchester and Pro-Chancellor at Brunel University, London. In August 2022 he took up the role of Chancellor of the University of Manchester, succeeding Lemn Sissay.

In December 2018, Afzal contacted the police in relation to English Defence League founder Tommy Robinson's interview with the 16-year-old alleged perpetrator of assaults on Syrian refugees at Almondbury Community School. Afzal stated that posting material naming the boy after he had been charged was an unlawful breach of reporting restrictions.

Since May 2021, he has been chair of the Catholic Safeguarding Standards Agency (CSSA), the professional body for safeguarding in the Catholic Church in England and Wales.

==== LGBT education in schools ====
In 2019, Parkfield Community School in Birmingham asked Afzal to mediate the issue on LGBT inclusive education. Some parents began protesting over the inclusion, fearing that adding lessons that include gay people were "promoting LGBT ways of life." The school argued that such education prevented homophobia. After analyzing the issue in depth, Afzal concluded that removing LGBT inclusion from education did “no service at all and no good at all." He also stated that school environments should be used “as somewhere they can learn things that they wouldn’t learn anywhere else”. He also warned that failing to teach children properly about sex and relationships could possibly lead to them being exploited by grooming gangs. Afzal stated that he feared some parents were being manipulated by outsiders with a different agenda. He said, "I have examined the curriculum myself and there is no specific LGBT content, no reference to gay sex, none at all - there is reference, as there should be, to equality."

==== Criticism of government cuts to the justice system ====
Afzal has been an outspoken critic of government cuts to the Crown Prosecution Service and Ministry of Justice. He stated that a tipping point had been reached in 2015: cuts would lead to a reduction in the number of senior staff, which would force the junior staff members to do more and more with less resources while being under increasing scrutiny. He claimed the cuts were one of the reasons that he decided to leave the CPS. In 2019, he said the cuts and other lack of resources were responsible for a drastic fall in rape prosecutions and convictions, leading to him to conclude that rape has "effectively been decriminalised."

In 2019 Afzal revealed that he had met with Boris Johnson in 2016, before he was prime minister. Afzal warned Johnson that government cutbacks meant that incarcerated terrorists were being released early; however, these individuals remained radicalised and thus were likely to commit acts of terror again. Afzal urged Johnson to increased funding for efforts to de-radicalise these prisoners, but he was told that such funding would not be available. Afzal revealed the conversation after Johnson, then as Prime Minister, criticized the policy of early release for terrorists in August 2019.

== Honours and awards ==
Afzal was appointed an Officer of the Order of the British Empire in the 2005 New Year Honours. The Manchester Evening News reported that Afzal had received the CPS Public Servant of the Year award, the UK Government's Justice Award and the Daily Mirror newspaper People's Award, the Law Society/Bar Council Mentoring award and was selected for the Asian Power 100, along with the Muslim Power 100 list.

Afzal was appointed a Fellow of the University of Central Lancashire in 2013 for "raising public awareness of domestic violence, forced marriage and 'honour' based crimes".

In January 2013, Afzal was awarded the Services to Law award at the British Muslim Awards. He was named Legal Personality of the Year by the Society of Asian Lawyers.

He received honorary doctorates in Law from the University of Birmingham in 2014, from the University of Manchester in 2017 and the University of Leicester in 2019.

=== Representations in popular culture ===
When he was director of the Crown Prosecution Service for London West, the TV police procedural Law & Order: UK used him "for guidance on plot lines and realism" and designed the set to mimic his office.

The BBC three-part drama Three Girls, based on the Rochdale scandal, was broadcast on consecutive nights 16–18 May 2017 and featured the actor Ace Bhatti playing Afzal. He also served as a consultant on the series.

== Personal life ==
Afzal has been married three times. In his own words; "First to an Irish Catholic, then to an Indian Hindu and then to a British Sikh." He has one daughter and three sons and is a practising Muslim.

In May 2020, Afzal's brother died due to COVID-19, and UK rules meant Afzal was unable to go to the funeral.

Afzal's memoir The Prosecutor, published in April 2020, was described by Richard Scorer in the New Law Journal as "an inspiring account of the career of an outstanding public servant". Writing in The Sunday Times, Rosamund Urwin called it a "fast-paced memoir" which "explores what led him to become a champion of the ignored".

== See also ==
- List of British Pakistanis
- Pakistan–United Kingdom relations
