= Refugees of the Syrian civil war =

Human toll of the Syrian civil war
- Pre-war population 22 ±.5; Internally displaced 6 ±.5, Refugees 5.5 ±.5, Fatalities 0.5 ±.1 (millions)

Syrian refugees
- By country: Turkey, Lebanon, Egypt, Jordan
- Settlements: Camps: Jordan

Internally displaced Syrians

Casualties of the war
- Crimes: War crimes, massacres, rape

Refugees of the Syrian civil war are citizens and permanent residents of Syria who fled the country in the course of the Syrian civil war. The pre-war population of Syria was estimated at 22 million (2017), including permanent residents. Of that number, the United Nations (UN) identified 13.5 million (2016) as displaced persons in need of humanitarian assistance. Since the start of the Syrian civil war in 2011 more than six million (2016) were internally displaced, and around five million (2016) crossed into other countries, seeking asylum or placement in Syrian refugee camps. It is believed to be one of the world's largest refugee crises.

Armed revolts started across Syria in 2011 when security forces launched a violent campaign to halt nation-wide protests. This led to the establishment of resistance militias and the outbreak of a civil war. Assaults on civilian areas by the Syrian Armed Forces resulted in the forced displacement of millions of Syrians and a full-blown refugee crisis. The Regional Refugee and Resilience Plan (3RP) was established in 2015 as a coordination platform including neighboring countries except Israel. By 2016, various nations had made pledges to the United Nations High Commissioner for Refugees (UNHCR) to permanently resettle 170,000 registered refugees. Syrian refugees have contributed to the European migrant crisis, with the UNHCR receiving almost one million asylum applicants in Europe by August 2017. Turkey was the largest host country of registered refugees, with 3.6 million Syrian refugees in 2019, 3.3 million in 2023, and almost 3 million at the time of the fall of the Assad regime in December 2024.

As of December 2022, a minimum of 580,000 people were estimated to be dead; with 13 million Syrians being displaced and 6.7 million refugees forced to flee Syria. The Ba'athist government and its security apparatus have arrested and tortured numerous repatriated refugees, subjecting them to forced disappearances and extrajudicial executions. Around 12 million Syrians live under conditions of severe food insecurity. More than two-thirds of the displaced are women and children.

The Law No. 10 issued by Bashar al-Assad in 2018 enabled the state to confiscate properties from displaced Syrians and refugees, and has made the return of refugees harder for fear of being targeted by the regime. Humanitarian aid to internally displaced persons within Syria and Syrian refugees in neighboring countries is planned largely through the UNHCR office. UNHCR Filippo Grandi has described the Syrian refugee crisis as "the biggest humanitarian and refugee crisis of our time and a continuing cause for suffering."

== Statistics ==
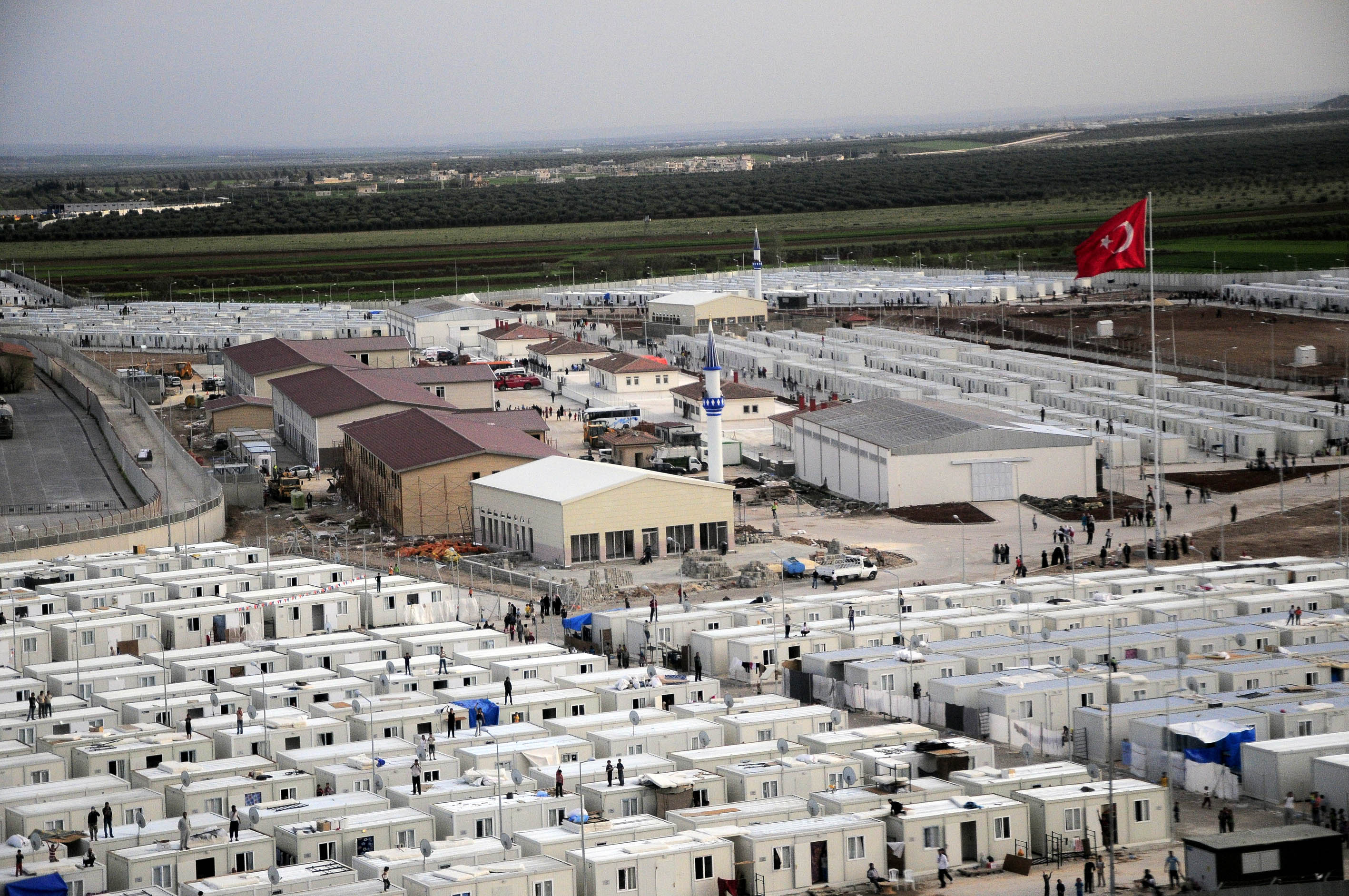
Syrian refugee camp in Turkey

Over 13.4 million Syrians had been forcibly displaced by October 2025. At least 6.7 million of them have left the country (more than half of them to Turkey), with the rest moving within Syria.

The Eurostat/UN Expert Group on Refugee and Internally Displaced Persons Statistics (EGRIS) considers three distinct main categories of people of concern:

1. persons in need of international protection (e.g. asylum seekers, refugees, etc.);
2. persons with a refugee background (e.g. naturalized former refugees, children born of refugee parents, reunited family members, etc.);
3. persons returned from abroad after seeking international protections.

The United Nations High Commissioner for Refugees (UNHCR) curates a database of estimated number of Syrian refugees and asylum seekers per country. These numbers are gathered from local governments, but do not include former refugees that have been resettled. The total number of refugees that a country has received may therefore be higher, if a country has accepted or rejected refugees. The data below is gathered from the UNHCR Refugee Data Finder, and supplemented with several additional sources.

=== Persons in need of international protection, over time, per receiving country ===
The graph below shows how many Syrian refugees and asylum seekers have been present outside Syria over time, as registered by the UNHCR. Note that this does not include people from the moment they are resettled, unregistered refugees, and illegal immigrants.

View source data.

Includes refugees and people in refugee-like situations. Last updated mid-2025. Countries below 100,000 Syrians have been grouped in 'Other countries'.

=== Total displacement of Syrians per country ===
An approach to include not just current refugees but also the former refugees that have resettled, is to consider the immigration per country. Depending on local census frequency and inclusion criteria, these numbers may be more or less approximate. The net immigration is the difference in citizens from Syria between 2011 and the time of data collection. As such it does not include people who returned to Syria. Neither UNHCR nor immigration data include illegal immigrants.

Syrian displacement per country Countries under 1000 persons are grouped under 'other countries'
| Country | UNHCR Refugee Data | | Immigration Data (Note: From various government sources. Inclusion criteria vary by source and by country.) | | notes / other sources |
| Country | Refugees and Others of Concern (Note: Includes prospective asylum seekers, persons with determined protection status, and people in refugee-like situations.) | Asylum Seekers | Net Immigration From Syria Since 2011 | Source | notes / other sources |
|---|---|---|---|---|---|
| Algeria | 6,435 | 0 | [?] | | 50,000 estimated migrants until 2019 |
| Argentina | 851 | 78 | [?] | | 318 resettlers until Nov 2017 |
| Armenia | 14,734 | 10 | [?] | | |
| Australia | 629 | 66 | 15,105 | | |
| Austria | 53,015 | 1,601 | 45,474 | (Note: No immigration data available for 2013.) | |
| Belgium | 16,555 | 2,190 | 31,450 | | |
| Brazil | 3,814 | 4,264 | [?] | | 9,000 approved in Feb 2016 |
| Bulgaria | 17,832 | 164 | 15,003 | (Note: No immigration data available for 2011.) | |
| Canada | 70,000 | 257 | 70,000 | | |
| Croatia | 554 | 19 | 679 | | |
| Cyprus | 11,859 | 4,158 | [?] | | 7,820 positive asylum decisions 2011–2020 |
| Czechia | 423 | 11 | 1,074 | | |
| Denmark | 19,964 | 227 | 35,366 | | |
| Egypt | 131,235 (Note: Last update 31 March 2021.) | 0 | [?] | | 170,000 approximate unregistered refugees in 2015 |
| Ethiopia | 0 | 416 | [?] | | 9,000 |
| Finland | 2,604 | 51 | 6,415 | | |
| France | 19,265 | 3,101 | [?] | | |
| Gaza Strip | [?] | [?] | [?] | | 1,000 as of December 2013 |
| Germany | 562,168 | 38,124 | 788,327 | | |
| Greece | 36,013 | 7,520 | [?] | | 54,574 estimated in May 2016 |
| Hungary | 933 | 9 | 2,117 | | |
| Iraq | 244,760 | 0 | [?] | | |
| Ireland | 2,899 | 55 | [?] | | |
| Italy | 4,815 | 1,060 | 6,577 | | |
| Jordan | 665,404 | 0 | [?] | | 98,353 estimated unregistered refugees in 2015 |
| Lebanon | 855,172 refugees + 1,824 others of concern | 0 | [?] | | UNHCR registration suspended by the government since 2015; 1.5 million Syrians estimated by UNHCR in December 2020 |
| Libya | 649 | 18,160 | [?] | | 26,672 registered as of December 2015 |
| Luxembourg | 951 | 225 | 2,165 | | |
| Malaysia | 412 | 2,854 | [?] | | |
| Malta | 1,791 | 410 | [?] | | |
| Morocco | 4,096 | 0 | [?] | | |
| Netherlands | 32,598 | 3,266 | 87,381 | | |
| Norway | 14,554 | 232 | 31,335 | | |
| Qatar | 34 | 0 | [?] | | 54,000 2017 |
| South Korea | 1,209 | 61 | [?] | | |
| Romania | 1,976 | 124 | 2,659 | (Note: No immigration data available for 2019.) | |
| Russia | 415 | 41 | [?] | | 7,096 overstays in residence to April 2016 |
| Saudi Arabia | 163 | 2,460 | [?] | | 673,669 Syrian visitors on 31 Dec 2018; 262,573 Syrian visitors on 8 June 2019 |
| Serbia and Kosovo (Note: Serbia and Kosovo are grouped in the UNHCR statistics.) | 913 | 41 | [?] | | 11,831 applicants to February 2016 |
| Somalia | 257 | 5 | [?] | | 1,312 as of January 2016 |
| Spain | 14,491 | 1,805 | [?] | | |
| Sudan | 93,498 | 0 | [?] | | no government migration data available |
| Sweden | 114,054 | 1,819 | 172,600 | | |
| Switzerland | 20,077 | 263 | 5,192 | | |
| Syria | 6,734,787 | —N/a | —N/a | | |
| Tunisia | 1,707 | 0 | [?] | | 4,000 September 2015 |
| Turkey | 3,763,565 (Note: Last update 21 April 2021.) | 0 | [?] | | |
| United Arab Emirates | 368 | 6,551 | [?] | | 242,000 Syrian nationals living in UAE in 2015 |
| United Kingdom | 11,422 | 1,459 | approx. 23,000 | | |
| United States | 8,559 | 2,504 | [?] | | 16,218 resettled by November 2016 |
| Yemen | 3,589 | 409 | [?] | | 100,000 refugees in 2015 |
| (United Nations) Other Countries (Note: Combination of the remaining (non-exhaustive) data from UNHCR and Eurostat, for countries with less than 1000 Syrian refugees/migrants each.) | 7,478 | 1,551 | 1,478 | | |

== History ==
=== Background ===
Human rights in Syria under the rule of the Ba'ath Party (1963–2024) are considered to be in exceptionally poor conditions by international observers and have been deteriorating further since 2008. The 2010–11 Arab Spring uprisings in Tunisia, Egypt, Libya, Bahrain and Yemen inspired major protests in Syria. The Syrian Army intervened in March 2011, and the Syrian government crackdown gradually increased in violence, escalating to major military operations to suppress resistance. In April, hundreds died in clashes between the Syrian Army and opposition forces, which included armed protestors and defected soldiers. As Syria descended into civil war, it quickly became divided into a complex patchwork of shifting alliances and territories between the Assad government, rebel groups, the SDF, and Salafi jihadist groups (including ISIL). Over half a million people died in the war, including around two hundred thousand civilians.

By May 2011, thousands of people had fled from the war to neighbouring countries, with even larger numbers displaced within Syria itself. As armies assaulted various locations and battled, entire villages were trying to escape, with thousands of refugees a day crossing borders. Other reasons for displacement in the region, often adding to the Syrian Civil War, target the refugees of the Iraqi civil war, Kurdish refugees, and Palestinian refugees.

"The Syria crisis has become the biggest humanitarian emergency of our era, yet the world is failing to meet the needs of refugees and the countries hosting them", the UN High Commissioner for Refugees António Guterres said in 2014. The UNHCR reported that the total number of refugees worldwide exceeds 50 million for the first time since World War II, largely due to the Syrian civil war.

=== Development ===
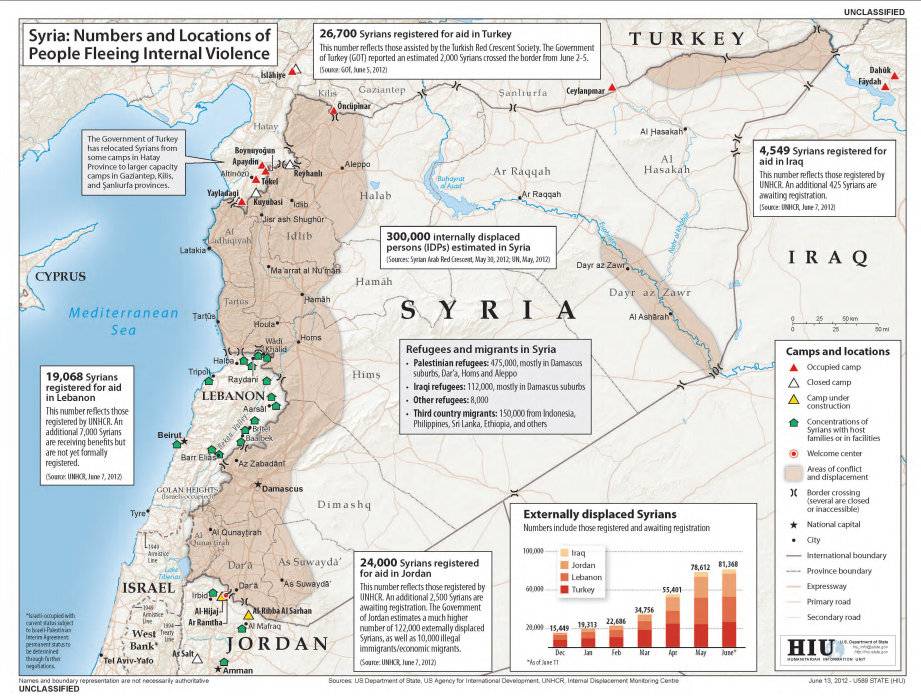
Number and location of people fleeing the violence in Syria, 13 June 2012.

The number of refugees that crossed the Turkish border reached 10,000–15,000 by mid 2011. More than 5,000 returned to Syria between July and August, while most were moved to newly built camps that hosted 7,600 refugees by November. By the end of 2011, the number of refugees were estimated to be 5,500–8,500 in Lebanon, with around 2,500 registered, around 1,500 registered in Jordan (with possibly thousands more unregistered), and thousands had found shelter in Libya.

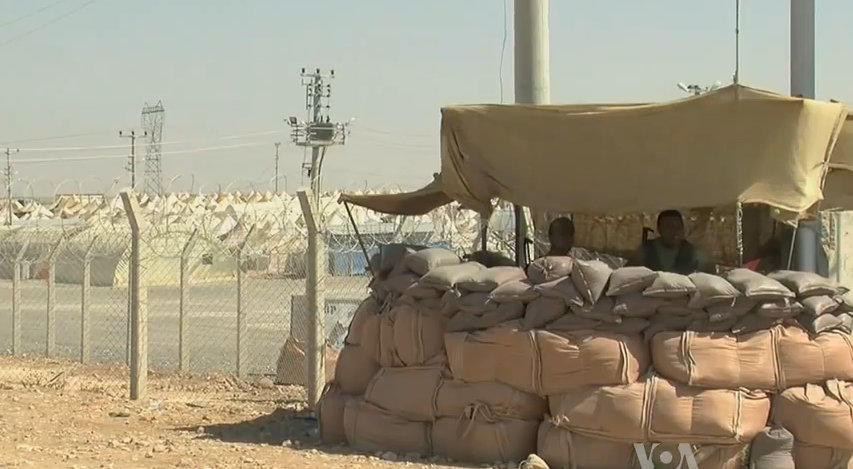
Syrian refugee center on the Turkish border 80 kilometers from Aleppo, Syria (3 August 2012).

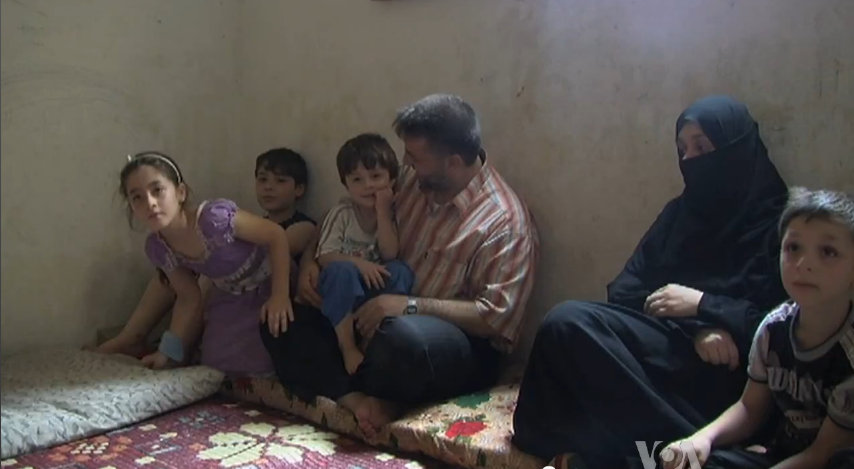
Syrian refugees in Lebanon living in cramped quarters (6 August 2012).

By April 2012, in the early insurgency phase of the Syrian civil war preceding 10 April ceasefire under the Kofi Annan peace plan, UN reported 200,000 or more Syrians internally displaced, 55,000 registered refugees and an estimated 20,000 not yet registered. 25,000 were registered in Turkey, 10,000 in Lebanon (mostly fleeing fighting in Homs, around 10,000 more were unregistered), 7,000 in Jordan (with 2,000 more unregistered estimated by the UNHCR, 20,000 according to JOHUD and 80,000 arrivals according to Jordanian officials), 800 in Iraq (400 more unregistered). Within Syria, there were 100,000 refugees from Iraq, 70,000 more already returned to Iraq.

In mid 2012, when the peace plan failed and the UN for the first time officially proclaimed Syria to be in a state of civil war, the number of registered refugees increased to more than 110,000. Over 2 days in July, 19,000 Syrians fled from Damascus into Lebanon, as violence inside the city escalated. The first Syrian refugees migrated by sea to the European Union, small numbers found asylum in various countries such as Colombia. Some refugees were turned away from Jordan. By the end of 2012, the UNHCR reported that the number of refugees jumped to well over 750,000 with 135,519 in Turkey; 54,000 in Iraqi Kurdistan and about 9,000 in the rest of Iraq; 150,000 in Lebanon 142,000 in Jordan and over 150,000 in Egypt

An estimated 1.5 million Syrians are refugees by the end of 2013. In 2014, the deteriorating humanitarian situation in neighboring Iraq prompted an influx of Iraqi refugees into north-eastern Syria. By the end of August, the UN estimated 6.5 million people had been displaced within Syria, while more than 3 million had fled to countries such as Lebanon (1.1 million), Jordan (600,000) and Turkey (800,000).

With the beginning of 2015, the European Union struggled to cope with the migrant crisis, its countries entering negotiations and heated political debate over closing or reinforcing borders and quota systems for resettlement of refugees and migrants from different parts of the world. The image of a drowned Syrian toddler's body washed up on a Turkish beach became a seminal moment in the refugee crises and global response. National debates and media coverage about the Syrian refugee crises increase markedly, bringing considerable attention to the human costs of the Syrian Civil War, the responsibilities of host countries, pressures forcing refugees to migrate from their host countries, people smuggling, and the responsibilities of third countries to resettle refugees.

In the same year in Turkey, Lebanon, Jordan, Iraq and Egypt, the Regional Refugee and Resilience Plan (3RP) was launched to better coordinate humanitarian help between UNHCR, governments and NGOs. In 2016, Jordan, Lebanon, and Turkey negotiated multi-year agreements with international donors that provided material support, namely the Jordan Compact, the Lebanon Compact, and the EU-Turkey Statement, respectively. The countries hosting the largest numbers of refugees also introduced a number of restrictions on new arrivals. Lebanon stopped new registrations and allows refugees to enter the country only in extreme circumstances. Jordan sealed its border with Syria during most of 2016, because of security concerns over ISIL control, according to government officials. Human Rights Watch and Amnesty International criticized Jordanian authorities for not allowing refugees in and suspending aid to the informal encampents reported on the border. Reports from the Syrian Observatory for Human Rights, the National Coalition of Syrian Revolution and Opposition Forces, Human Rights Watch and Amnesty International emerged in 2016 that Turkish border guards routinely shoot at Syrian refugees trying to reach Turkey, also, Turkey has forcibly returned thousands of Syrian refugees to war zone since mid-January 2016. The Turkish Foreign Ministry and President Erdoğan denied it.

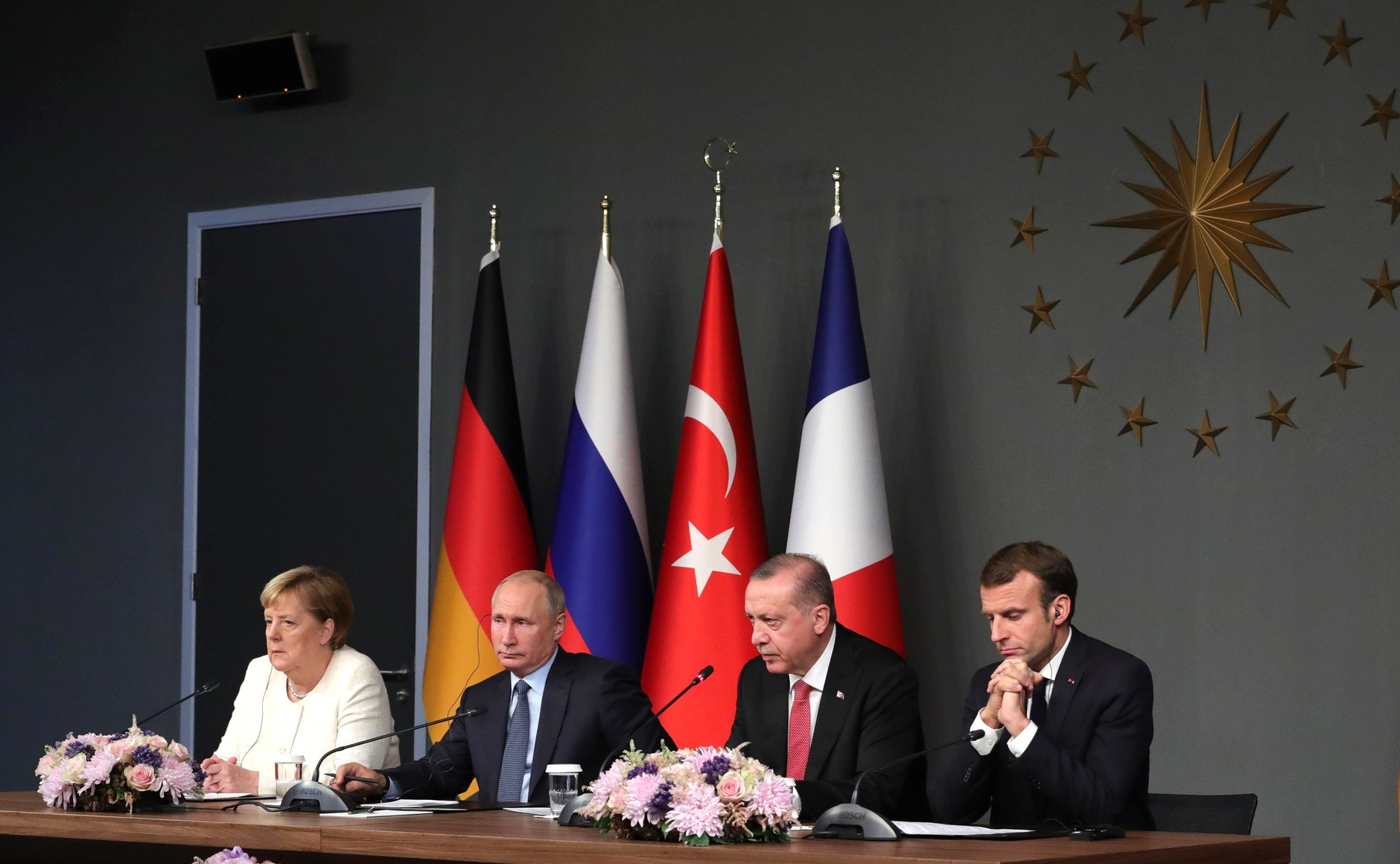
Angela Merkel, Vladimir Putin, Recep Tayyip Erdoğan and Emmanuel Macron giving a press conference as part of Syria summit in Istanbul, Turkey

In 2017, while the conflict in Syria and the reasons for displacement continue, few Syrians are able to leave it, due to more restrictive border management by neighboring countries. In the first half of 2017, an estimated 11 million displacements were recorded and around 250,000 more refugees have been registered in neighboring countries, however it is hard to estimate how many of them crossed the border recently. In the same period, an estimated 50,000 first time asylum applications have been made by Syrians in Europe, and around 100,000 new third country resettlements are planned for 2017. The outcome of the Civil war in Syria, that saw the overthrow of the Assad regime, caused many countries to reevaluate their policy regarding Syrian refugees, at least until the situation in Syria is clarified.

=== Returns ===
As of mid-2017, an estimated 260,000 refugees returned to Syria since 2015 and more than 440,000 internally displaced persons returned to their homes, to search for family, check on property and, in some cases, due to improved security in parts of the country. The Syrian foreign minister called on the country's refugees to return home. Nevertheless, the UNHCR stated that conditions in Syria are still unsafe and destitute, improvements in many areas are uncertain and many basic services are absent; access of aid convoys is also a challenge. As of 2019, only 5% of Syrians in Lebanon reported intending to return to Syria within the next 12 months, although a majority (roughly two-thirds), expected to return to Syria someday. Less than a half of the returnees have access to water or health services, due to extremely damaged infrastructure. An estimated 10 per cent ended up as internally displaced persons once again.

Human Rights Watch report published in October 2021 has stated that refugees who went back to Syria by their own choice suffered "grave human rights abuses and persecution at the hands of Syrian government and affiliated militias, including torture, extra-judicial killings, and kidnappings."

== Overall situation ==
The vast majority of refugees live below the poverty line (e.g. in 2016 in Lebanon most households were below $85 monthly per capita; in southeast Turkey, 90% were below $100 and 70% below $50 monthly per capita). Average monthly per capita expenditures were estimated in 2015–2016 at $104 in Lebanon and $55 in south-east Turkey. Underemployment and low wages are widespread. Many rely on less sustainable sources, food vouchers, taking credits or borrowing money mostly from friends and relatives, less frequently from shops and rarely from landlords (e.g., in Lebanon 90% households were in debt, $850 in average; in south-east Turkey more than half are in debt, a few hundred dollars on average). Because of this, refugees face difficulties accessing services and providing food, housing, healthcare and other basic needs for their families. Most refugees receive refugee-related information through SMS (e.g. 91% of registered households in Lebanon) and many use smartphones (in Lebanon, two thirds of households reported using WhatsApp).

In January 2019, the UN said that 15 displaced Syrian children, 13 of them under one year old, had died due to cold weather and inadequate medical care. In addition, several days of strong winds, heavy rain and snow and subsequent flooding caused the death of at least one child, as well as damage at more than 360 sites hosting 11,300 refugees in Lebanon. In Syria, families fleeing the conflict in Hajin had been left waiting in the cold for days without shelter or basic supplies. They are resettled to the refugee camps. In January 2021, 22,000 people lost their temporary homes as heavy rains, flooding, and snow destroyed over 4,000 tents at displacement camps in northern Idlib and western Aleppo.

=== Shelter ===
Refugees live primarily within hosting communities, in rented houses or informal settlements of tents and sub-standard dwellings. Only about 10% live in formal camps. In Lebanon, 85% pay rent, 71% live in residential building (regular apartments or in the micro-apartments designed for the building doorman/superintendent), 12% in non-residential structures (worksites, garages, shops), and 17% in informal tented settlements; a quarter of homes are overcrowded (less than 4.5 square meters per person). In southern Turkey, 96% of the refugees living outside of camps pay rent, 62% live in rented apartments, 28% in unfinished buildings or garages, 1% in tents. Refugees are commonly charged a higher rate compared to local people, especially for sub-standard conditions (in 2016, in Lebanon, a monthly average ranging from $53 for keeping tents on land to $250 for a non-shared apartment or house; in south east Turkey, roughly $250 for dwellings meeting SPHERE standards, excluding water and electricity costs). In Lebanon, many households face water shortages and a quarter of dwellings were in notably poor condition.

Few refugees have residency permits in Lebanon, mainly due to their cost, creating difficulties at checkpoints when moving in search for jobs.

==== Employment ====
Earning opportunities for refugees are predominantly informal, principally due to governments issuing few working permits. Barriers include quotas, fees, long and cumbersome paperwork, and discrimination by employers. In Turkey, even after reforms opening the labor market in January 2016, the number of refugees in a single workplace cannot exceed 10%; employers pay work permit fees of 600 TL ($180) every year; while there is an exemption for seasonal work, it requires a separate application and still requires being registered for at least 6 months. By late 2015 at most several thousand permits have been issued, refugees are thus overwhelmingly employed informally. Jobs are often seasonal and employment rates differ widely between winter and summer. In May 2016 in Lebanon, 36% working-age individuals (70% men, 7% women) reported working (for at least one day in the 30 days prior to a survey). Among them underemployment was widespread (working 14 days a month on average) and wages were low (on average $215 for working men and $115 for working women). The structure of employment was 33% construction, 22% agriculture, 26% services, 6% retail/shops, 6% cleaning.

Some Syrian refugees have resorted to prostitution as a means of survival, particularly among women and girls. There is increasing concern about the exploitation of female refugees.

The UNHCR has a policy of helping refugees work and be productive, using their existing skills to meet their own needs and needs of the host country:

Ensure the right of refugees to access work and other livelihood opportunities as they are available for nationals... Match programme interventions with corresponding levels of livelihood capacity (existing livelihood assets such as skills and past work experience) and needs identified in the refugee population, and the demands of the market... Assist refugees in becoming self-reliant. Cash/ food/rental assistance delivered through humanitarian agencies should be short-term and conditional and gradually lead to self-reliance activities as part of a longer-term development... Convene internal and external stakeholders around the results of livelihood assessments to jointly identify livelihood support opportunities.

=== Property loss and confiscations ===
In 2018, Syrian government issued Law No. 10, which allowed it to expropriate property in redevelopment zones. Rights groups and governments hosting Syrian refugees warned that the law could strip displaced Syrians of their property and discourage their return. In December 2020, news emerged that the regime was auctioning off lands of the displaced people to Assad loyalists and that this was being managed by the regime's security apparatus. These policies are intended as a "punishment" for citizens who are not being loyal enough to the regime.

=== Mobile technology ===
Refugees need to adjust to new and changing environments, especially before or during transition and upon arrival. Mobile phones play a key role by supporting refugees in their informal learning and problem-solving processes. The Syrian crisis sparked the development of numerous refugee apps, ranging from general catch-all apps to specific apps that focus on distinct domains such as accommodation, health or authorities.

Refugees tend to use their mobile devices and mobile social media to address informational and educational needs after their flight in relatively informal and unstructured ways. Studies from different contexts have documented how refugees use digital tools for manifold practical and instrumental tasks among themselves as well as with third parties in day-to-day situations or in emergencies. For example, a study on Syrian refugees in rural Lebanese camps describes women maintaining WhatsApp groups to coordinate issues such as transport with their neighbours.

Studies show that refugees use their cell phones to connect with local volunteers, for example via Facebook groups, for all sorts of practical guidance. Also in integration contexts, as in flight settings, mobile technology plays an essential role in obtaining assistance in emergencies, including access to medical or police services.

Social media have been widely adopted in the settings of the Syrian refugee crisis. Studies show, for example, that Syrians in Turkey access Facebook to obtain information on all types of integration issues, ranging from administration, jobs and housing to dining and events.

== UN dispute over Syrian aid renewal ==
As of 18 December 2019, a diplomatic dispute is occurring at the UN over re-authorization of cross-border aid for refugees. China and Russia are opposing the current draft resolution that seeks to re-authorize crossing points in Turkey, Iraq, and Jordan; China and Russia, as allies of Assad, seek to close the two crossing points in Iraq and Jordan, and to leave only the two crossing points in Turkey active.

All of the ten individuals representing the non-permanent members of the Security Council stood in the corridor outside of the chamber speaking to the press to state that all four crossing points are crucial and must be renewed.

United Nations official Mark Lowcock is asking the UN to re-authorize cross-border aid to enable aid to continue to reach refugees in Syria. He says there is no other way to deliver the aid that is needed. He noted that four million refugees out of the over eleven million refugees who need assistance are being reached through four specific international crossing points. Lowcock serves as the United Nations Under-Secretary-General for Humanitarian Affairs and Emergency Relief Coordinator and the Head of the United Nations Office for the Coordination of Humanitarian Affairs.

== In countries of the Regional Refugee and Resilience Plan ==
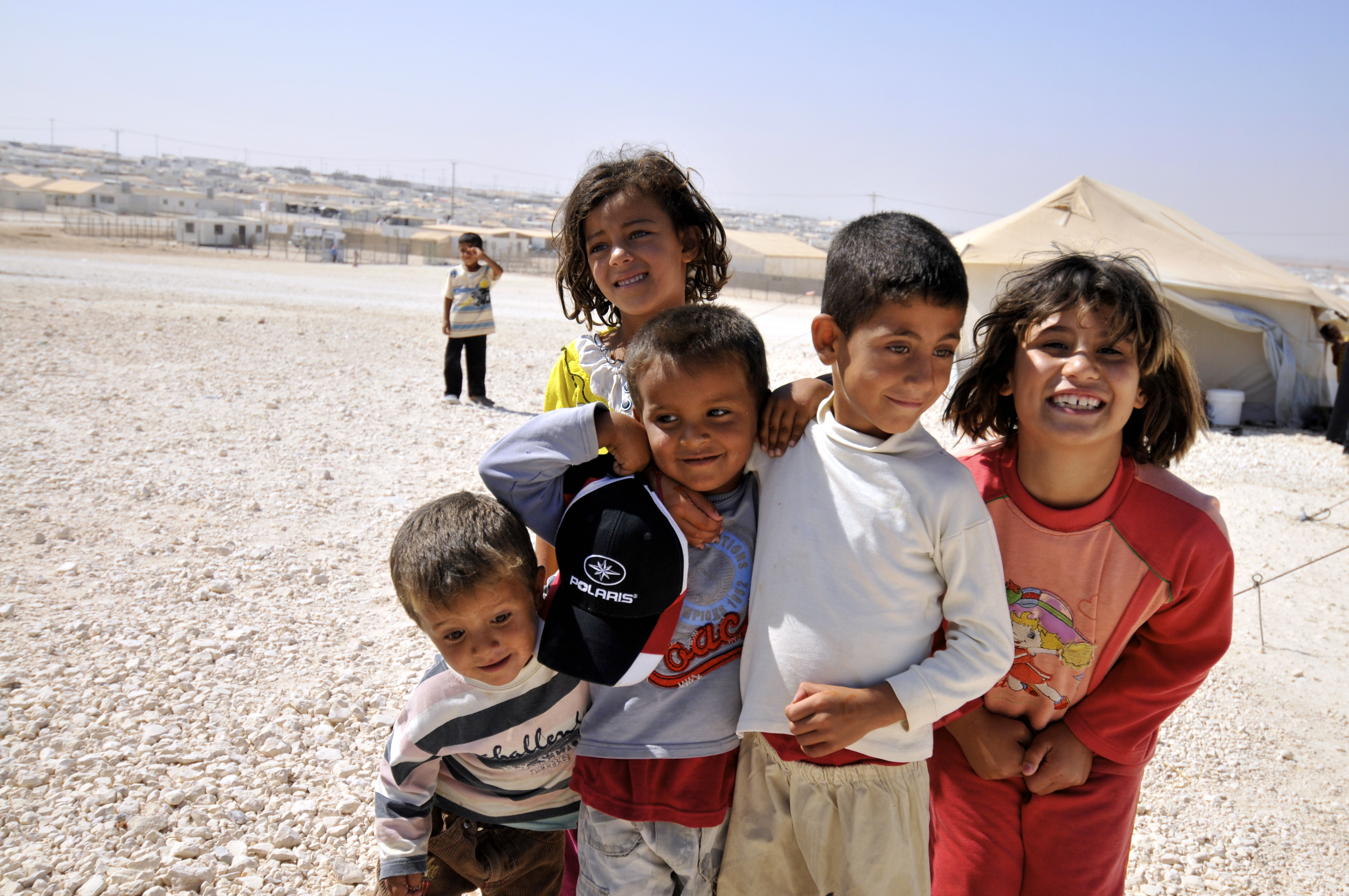
Zaatari refugee camp, Jordan

Number of Syrian refugees hosted in countries under the Regional Refugee and Resilience Plan. (August 2015) (Note: This map is outdated, for instance, registered Syrian refugee population in Turkey exceeds 3.5 million as of 2020)

The Regional Refugee and Resilience Plan (3RP) is a coordination effort between Jordan, Lebanon, Turkey, Iraq (countries neighboring Syria), Egypt, and United Nations agencies with NGOs including UNHCR and 240 partners. It describes itself as "a strategy document, coordination platform, advocacy tool, and funding appeal". The 3RP has been initiated at the break of 2015/2016, replacing the former inter-agency Regional Response Plan and coordinating response plans of each country, with national leadership and ownership as a foundational principle, to use in-country systems effectively and avoid creating parallel ones. It publishes strategic overviews and broad reports on the situation in constituent countries, describing in particular humanitarian efforts outside of Syria. These are directed at food and assistance, safe water access, formal education for children, primary health care consultations, shelter assistance, and access to wage employment. According to the 3RP, funding is not keeping up with needs of the region: only 6 percent of the 2017 Plan has been funded in the first three months, while the 2016 Plan has been funded at 63 percent. The 3RP also called for support including commitments to resettlement. The Libyan economy, ravaged by the crisis, is benefiting from the influx of thousands of Syrian refugees. Despite the lack of an official asylum policy and the chaotic human rights situation in Libya, Syrians are finding refuge there.

In the region, refugees predominantly live in urban, peri-urban and rural areas, while only about 10 percent live in camps. The majority live below the poverty line. Hosting countries face overburdened infrastructure, both public (e.g., water, health, roads) and private (e.g., housing), as well as severe disruption of exports through Syria.

=== By country ===
Egypt – Egypt, which does not border Syria, became a major destination for Syrian refugees after 2012, following the election of Egyptian President Mohamed Morsi. During Morsi's presidential term, there were an estimated between 70,000 and 100,000 Syrian refugees living in the country. Morsi's government tried to support Syrian refugees by offering residency permits, assistance with finding employment, allowing Syrian refugee children to register in state schools, and access to other public services.

Following the events relating to the 2013 Egyptian coup d'état, Syrian refugees were met with hostility by Egyptians, who accused them of supporting the Muslim Brotherhood, since the group has close relations with the Syrian opposition and the Free Syrian Army.

The interim government also tightened visa restrictions for Syrian citizens, requiring them to obtain a visa and a security clearance issuance before entering Egypt. Following these measures, at least 476 Syrians were denied entry or deported from Egypt. A number of flights carrying Syrians have been turned back from airports in Egypt to where their flight originated, including Damascus and Latakia, Syria. Following the post-coup unrest in Egypt, many Syrians have also made decisions to leave Egypt and settle in Europe instead.

However, a study by the Egyptian foreign affairs ministry has estimated that the country has hosted around 500,000 Syrian refugees since the start of the conflict. Egyptian President Abdel Fattah el-Sisi has also said that his country received around 500,000 Syrian refugees without "media shows". President al-Sisi has said that his government does not abuse refugees, adding that many international organizations stopped receiving refugees, causing an increase in the numbers and that his government still receives refugees despite Egypt facing an economic crisis.

In May 2017, the United Nations Development Programme (UNDP) and the International Labour Organization (ILO) reported that Syrian refugees have contributed US$800 million to the Egyptian economy since the start of the civil war.

In November 2017, President Abdel Fattah el-Sisi issued a decree approving a $15 million grant to support Syrian refugees in Egypt.

As of August 2019, Egypt hosts 130,371 Syrian refugees, compared to 114,911 in August 2016 and 122,213 in August 2017.

Jordan – As of June 2015, there were 628,427 registered Syrian refugees in Jordan. However, a Jordanian census carried out in November 2015 showed that there are 1.4 million Syrian refugees residing in the country, meaning that more than 50% of Syrian refugees in Jordan are unregistered. A 2016 report by the World Bank revealed that the Syrian refugee influx to Jordan has cost the kingdom more than $2.5 billion a year, which amounts to about 6% of Jordan's GDP, and about a quarter of the government's annual revenues. Promised international aid has fallen several hundreds of millions of dollars short of the total cost. This has caused the kingdom's public debt to swell to 95% of its GDP in 2016, and has severely crippled the growth of its economy. The majority of the refugees in Jordan live in the local communities rather than refugee camps, which had added a large strain on the country's infrastructure, particularly towns in northern Jordan adjacent to the Syrian border.

Lebanon – As of October 2016, Lebanon hosted 1.5 million Syrian refugees according to Lebanese government estimates, while as of July 2019, the number of officially registered Syrian refugees in Lebanon dropped to less than 1 million, according to official accounts of the UNHCR's Syria Regional Refugee Response, half of them children (below 18 years old), along with 31,502 Palestine Refugees from Syria, 35,000 Lebanese returnees, and a pre-existing population of more than 277,985 Palestine Refugees. They constitute in total 30% of the Lebanese population (estimated at 5.9 million), or 25% for the Syrian refugees alone, making Lebanon the country with the highest number of refugees per inhabitant. The Lebanese government chose not to establish camps for people fleeing the civil war in Lebanon, and thus they have settled throughout country. While most of them rent their accommodations in around 1,700 locations countrywide, nearly a fifth (18%) live in non-formal settlements—mostly concentrated in border governorates. Because the government of Lebanon has increasingly made it difficult for refugees from Syria to renew their residency permits, the number of households in which all members are legally in the country has dropped from 58% in 2014 to 29% in 2015. Refugee households living below the poverty line increased from 49% in 2014 to 70% in 2015. Families survive by borrowing money whenever they can. The percentage of refugee households with debt jumped from 70% in 2013 to 89% in 2015. Despite their struggling status, the Lebanese Forces Party, the Kataeb Party and the Free Patriotic Movement fear the country's sectarian-based political system is being undermined.

Tensions rose in Lebanon when the army raided refugee sites in Arsal in 2014. The Muslim Scholars Committee condemns what it calls human rights abuses saying "the collective punishment of Syrian refugees cannot be justified," and calling for a 'transparent and impartial investigation of the violations, from the burning of camps to the torturing of detainees in Arsal.

Following the fall of Bashar al-Assad's regime in December 2024, Syrian refugees in Lebanon faced a complex and evolving situation. While the regime change sparked hopes for return among many of the estimated 1.5 million Syrians residing in Lebanon, the reality proved more challenging. Although some refugees began returning to Syria, ongoing violence, particularly targeting Alawite communities, led to new waves of displacement into Lebanon. In March 2025, sectarian violence in Syria's coastal regions resulted in hundreds of deaths and forced thousands, primarily Alawites, to flee to Lebanon, highlighting the persistent instability in their homeland.

In Lebanon, the influx of refugees has exacerbated existing economic and social pressures. The country, already grappling with a severe economic crisis, has witnessed rising anti-refugee sentiment and calls for accelerated repatriation of Syrians. The Lebanese government, supported by international aid, including a €1 billion package from the European Union, has emphasized the need to manage the refugee population and address security concerns. However, human rights organizations caution against forced returns, citing ongoing dangers in Syria. The situation underscores the delicate balance Lebanon must maintain between humanitarian obligations and domestic stability.

Iraq – As of December 2019, Iraq hosts 245,810 Syrian refugees, primarily in the Kurdistan Region of Iraq, and 1.4 million internally displaced Iraqis. This is compared to February 2016, when it hosted 245,543 Syrians and 3.2 million internally displaced Iraqis. Several refugee camps exist in northern Iraq. The government in Iraqi Kurdistan is currently hosting Syrian refugees that are ethnic Kurds. While many Kurdish Syrian refugees live in camps, a significant number of them have moved to urban areas and cities of Kurdistan Region.

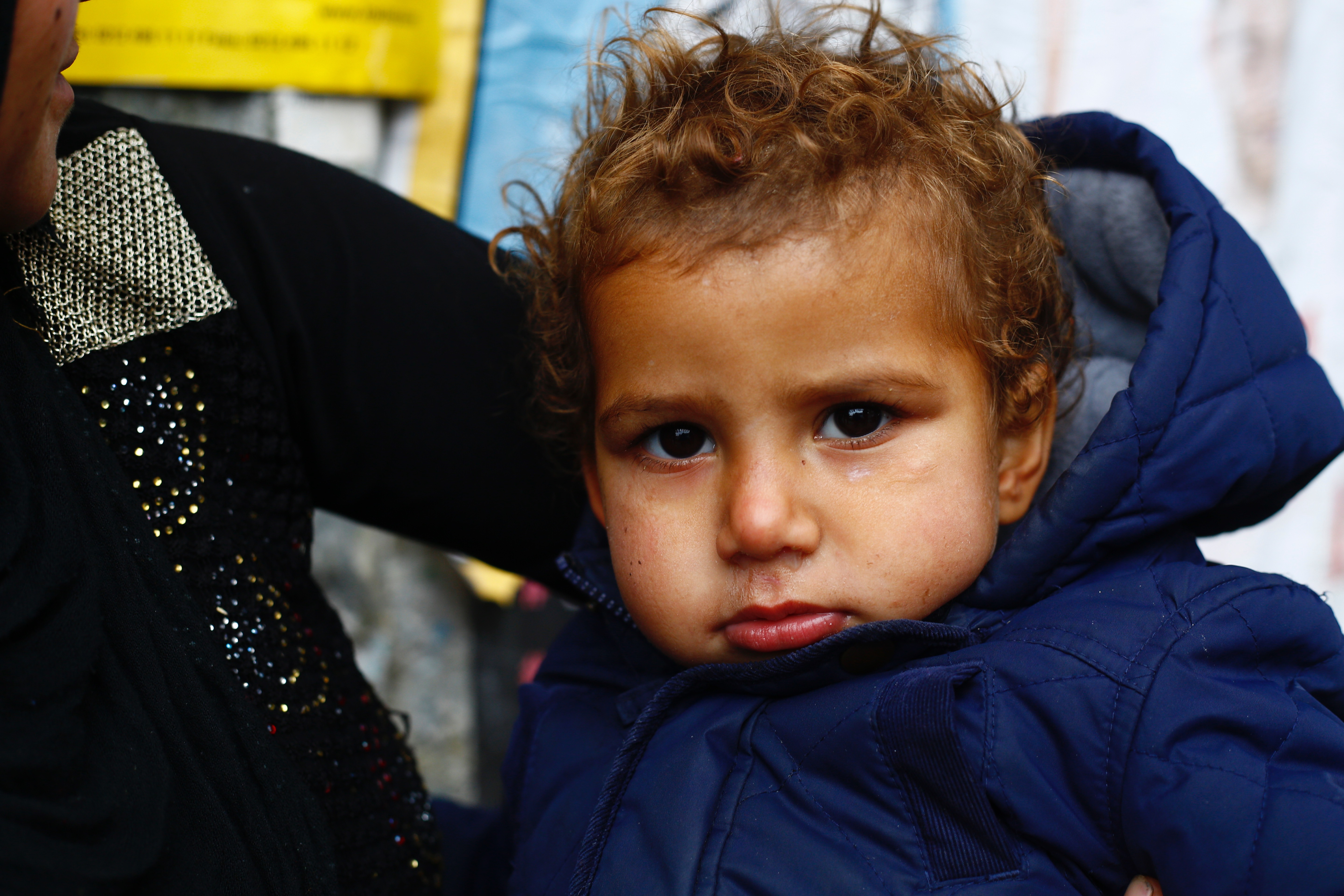
A Syrian refugee child in Istanbul

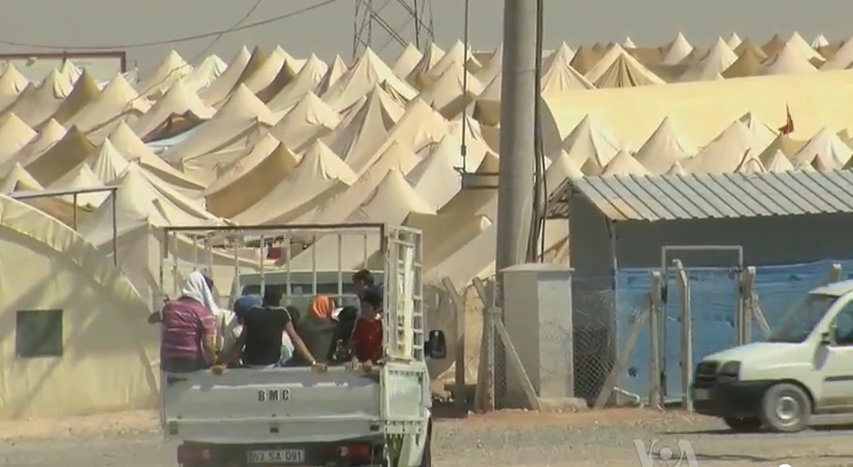
Syrian refugee centre on the Turkish border 80 kilometres from Aleppo, Syria (3 August 2012).

Turkey – As of September 2019, Turkey hosts 3.66 million registered Syrian refugees, compared to 2.73 million in September 2016. About 30% live in 22 government-run camps near the Syrian border. Turkey is home to the highest number of Syrian refugees and has provided over $8,000,000,000 in aid. Financial aid from other countries has been limited, though €3,200,000,000 was promised by the EU in November 2015. The promise is still not fulfilled. Turkey's response to the refugee crisis is different from most other countries. As a World Bank report noted: It is a non-camp and government financed approach, as opposed to directing refugees into camps that rely on humanitarian aid agencies for support.

Under Turkish law, Syrian refugees cannot apply for resettlement but only temporary protection status. Registering for temporary protection status gives access to state services such as health and education, as well as the right to apply for a work permit in certain geographic areas and professions. Over a third of urban refugees are not registered. Currently, 30% of Syrian refugee children have access to education, 4,000 businesses have been opened, and several Syrian refugee camps have grown into small towns with amenities from healthcare to barber shops. Over 13 million Syrians received aid from the Turkish Aid Agency (AFAD). Turkey has spent more than any other country on Syrian refugee aid, and has also been subject to criticism for opening refugee camps on the Syrian side of the border. Assyrian Christians have been allowed to return to their historic homeland in Tur Abdin, Turkey. Up to 300,000 Syrian refugees living in Turkey could be given citizenship under a plan to keep wealthy and educated Syrians in the country. A study which was supported by the Istanbul University Scientific Research Projects unit and conducted by academics from a number of universities, revealed that the vast majority of Syrians in Turkey are employed in unregistered work for significantly lower wages compared to their Turkish counterparts.

Human rights groups have repeatedly denounced Turkish troops for shooting at civilians attempting to cross the border since early 2016. According to the Syrian Observatory for Human Rights, a total of 163 refugees, including 15 women and 31 children, were allegedly killed as of August 2017. Physical abuse and public humiliating by soldiers has also been reported. Similar accusations were made by Human Rights Watch, the National Coalition of Syrian Revolution and Opposition Forces, and Amnesty International, which also claims Turkey has forcibly returned thousands of Syrian refugees to war zone since January 2016. Turkish authorities deny the claims, but arrested several soldiers in August 2017 after a video surfaced of them abusing of a few young Syrian men trying to illegally cross the border into the country.

On 18 May 2016, lawmakers from the European Parliament's Subcommittee on Human Rights (DROI) have said that Turkey should not use Syrian refugees as a bribe for the process of visa liberalization for Turkish citizens inside the European Union.

A factory producing fake lifejackets, made for migrants wanting to cross the Aegean Sea to Greece, was discovered in Turkey. Police seized more than 1,200 fake lifejackets from the factory at İzmir, and arrested four workers including two young Syrian girls. The raid came in the same week that the bodies of more than 30 people washed up on Turkish beaches, having drowned in their attempt to reach Greece. After the agreement of a multibillion-euro deal between the EU and Turkey, Turkish police increased their operations against people involved in the wider smuggling business.

On 3 June 2016, a Turkish cleaner, Mahmutcan Ateş, working at the Nizip Camp in Gaziantep, Turkey, was sentenced to 108 years imprisonment for sexually abusing Syrian boys. He did not deny the charges, but said many employees and managers in the camps were involved. He also admitted that he paid the children around 2–5 Turkish lira ($0.70–$1.70) before assaulting them in the toilets, the victims were between ages 8 to 12.

With continuous refugees fleeing into their country, by 2018 Turkey has been reported in hosting 63.4% of all the refugees in the world. This left Turkey with 3,564,919 registered refugees in total. However compared to the increase in refugees, benefits towards them weren't increased as much as only 712,218 were given residency permits only 56,024 work permits were given to the Syrians by 2017. Although Turkey tries to keep its promise in taking good care of the refugees, the dramatic wave in Syrian refugees as a whole affected and continues to affect the Turkish economy and society. Turkey continues to support the refugees by building around 28 shelters for the victims of human trafficking, however outside the camps, only 24% of Syrian children have access to education, work permits are still highly restricted, lack of systematic social benefits are becoming worse, and even border control has become more strict. Although 90% of the Syrian refugees in Turkey live outside the camps and inside the citites, and although Turkey holds the highest population rate in refugees as a whole, Turkey continues to struggle with the amount of responsibility they hold of the 3.5 million refugees.

== In other Middle Eastern countries ==
=== By country ===
Armenia – The government is offering several protection options including simplified naturalization by Armenian descent (19,500 persons acquired Armenian citizenship), accelerated asylum-procedures and facilitated short, mid and long-term residence permits. Ethnic Armenians in Syria have been fleeing to their historic Armenia homelands. The Cilician school was established to provide education specifically for Syrian-Armenian refugee children with support from the governments of Kuwait and Austria.

As of January 2017, there were 22,000 refugees, primarily ethnic Armenians in the country. In addition another 38 Armenian families (about 200 people) resettled in the de facto independent Nagorno-Karabakh Republic as of 2014. 50 Yazidi families (about 400 people) have also found refuge in Armenia. Armenia is home to a Yazidi community, currently numbering 35,000.

Azerbaijan – As of 2019, 43 Syrian refugees have applied for asylum in Azerbaijan. Azerbaijan has voiced its protest against Armenia's measures to resettle Syrian Armenian refugees in the Armenian-occupied Azerbaijani regions of Lachin and Gubadli (claimed by the Armenian-backed unrecognised Nagorno-Karabakh Republic), accusing it of artificially changing the demographic situation and the ethnic composition of these once Azeri-populated districts.

Bahrain – Bahrain rejected reports from Bahraini opposition that they were trying to alter the country's demographics by naturalizing Syrians.

Israel – Israel has a disputed border with Syria's Golan Heights. In 2012, Israel announced preparations to accommodate Alawite Syrian refugees in the Golan Heights, should the Syrian government collapse. Israeli Prime Minister Benjamin Netanyahu said: "We will not allow Israel to be submerged by a wave of illegal migrants and terrorist activists." Israelis from humanitarian groups have operated in Jordan to assist Syrian refugees who have fled there. By March 2015, nearly 2000 Syrians injured in the Syrian Civil War had been treated in Israeli hospitals. In January 2017, the Israeli interior ministry announced that they will resettle around 100 unaccompanied Syrian refugee children. They will be given temporary residency status and will have full rights, though they would not receive an Israeli passport. The report also said that the Israeli government was even willing to promise the UN that after four years, the resettled refugees will be given permanent residency – allowing them to stay in Israel for a lifetime period.

Iran – As of early 2014 Iran has sent 150 tons of humanitarian goods including 3,000 tents and 10,000 blankets to the Red Crescents of Jordan, Iraq and Lebanon via land routes to be distributed among the Syrian refugees residing in the three countries.

Kuwait – Kuwait has an estimated 120,000 Syrians. More specifically, Kuwait extends residency permits for Syrian expatriates who have overstayed in Kuwait.

Saudi Arabia – Saudi Arabia has offered resettlement only for Syrian migrants that had a family in the kingdom, and has an estimated number of Syrian migrants and foreign workers that reaches 100,000 living with their families and has sent aid worth $280 million to help Syrian refugees. Saudi Arabia, like all of the Gulf states, is not a signatory to the 1951 United Nations Refugee Convention. According to the Saudi official, Saudi Arabia had issued residency permits to 100,000 Syrians. The BBC reported that "most successful cases are Syrians already in Gulf states extending their stays, or those entering because they have family there." Amnesty International reported that Saudi Arabia has not actually offered any resettlement specifically to refugees. They are not classified as refugees. The Saudi Ministry of Interior announced in 2016 that it had accepted more than 2,500,000+ refugees into the kingdom.

== In Europe ==
National governments' position on 22 September 2015 European Union Justice and Home Affairs Council majority vote to relocate 120,000 refugees (including Syrian refugees) from Greece and Italy to other EU countries: Yes Opt-out Abstention No Non-EU state

In August 2012, the first Syrian refugees migrated by sea to the European Union.

Under the Dublin Regulation, an asylum applicant in one EU country, must be returned to that country, should they attempt onward migration to another EU country. Hungary is overburdened in 2015 by asylum applications during the European Migrant Crises, to the point that on 23 June its refuses to allow further applicants to be returned by other EU countries. Germany and the Czech Republic suspend the Dublin Regulation for Syrians and start to process their asylum applications directly. On 21 September, EU home affairs and interior ministers approve a plan to accept and redistribute 120,000 asylum seekers (not only Syrians) across the EU. The Czech Republic, Hungary, Romania and Slovakia opposed the plan and Finland abstains. Poorer countries express concerns about the economic and social cost of absorbing large numbers of refugees. Wealthier countries are able to offer more humanitarian assistance.

Large numbers of refugees cross into the EU and by mid-2015 there are 313,000 asylum applications across Europe. The largest numbers are recorded in Germany with over 89,000, and Sweden with over 62,000. More than 100,000 refugees cross into the EU in July 2015, and by September over 8,000 refugees crossed to Europe daily, with Syrians forming the largest group.

By 21 December 2015, an estimated 500,000 Syrian refugees have entered Europe, 80 percent arrived by sea, and most land in Greece.

On 19 February 2016, Austria imposes restrictions on the number of refugee entries. Slovenia, Croatia, Serbia and Macedonia announced that just 580 refugees a day will be allowed through their borders. As a result, large numbers of Syrian refugees are stuck in Greece. There are fears that Greece won't be able to cope with the thousands stranded in the reception centres scattered across the mainland and the islands of Lesbos, Kos and Chios.

=== By country ===
Austria – In 2015, there were at least 18,000 estimated Syrian refugees in Austria. In 2018, there were 48,103 Syrian nationals residing in Austria.

Bulgaria – Bulgaria welcomes refugees when in transit to Germany to apply for refugee status. Bulgaria received 11,080 asylum applications in 2014, 56% of which were made by Syrian citizens and on which 94.2% of first instance decisions were positive for Syrian citizens, making it the country with the highest acceptance rate in the EU. For the period of January–July 2015, there were estimated 9,200 asylum applications to Bulgaria with average acceptance rate remaining the same as in the previous year.

In August 2013, there is a sharp increase in refugees entering Bulgaria. Bulgarian refugee centers are at capacity and the government seeks emergency accommodations and asks the EU and Red Cross for aid.

Czech Republic – In October 2015, the UN's human rights chief claims the Czech Republic is holding migrants in "degrading" and jail like conditions

Croatia – Croatia welcomes refugees when in transit to Germany to apply for refugee status. In addition, Croatia, an EU member state, shares land border with Serbia, therefore there is a risk of strong inflow of migrants from Serbia considering that Hungary erected a fence on its border with Serbia. Nearly 80% of the border consist of Danube river, but the problem is 70 kilometers long so-called "Green Border" near Tovarnik. According to the Croatian Minister of Interior Ranko Ostojić "police in the area has enough people and equipment to protect Croatian border against illegal immigrants". Croatian President Kolinda Grabar-Kitarović and First Deputy Prime Minister Vesna Pusić rejected option of building a fence on Croatian border with Serbia. On 15 September 2015, Croatia started to experience the first major waves of refugees of the Syrian Civil War. "First Syrian refugees cross Croatia-Serbia border, carving out potential new route through Europe after Hungary seals borders". Croatia closed its border with Serbia on 19 October 2015 due to "overwhelming numbers".

Cyprus – In 2024, Cyprus had 30,000 Syrian refugees under subsidiary protection.

Denmark – In September 2015 public concerns remained about the arrival of refugees, and was shifting to concern over the immediate issues revolving around those already in Denmark.

France – In November 2015, President François Hollande reaffirmed France's commitment to accept 30,000 refugees over two years, despite concerns arising from the November 2015 Paris attacks a few days earlier. His announcement drew a standing ovation from a gathering of French mayors.

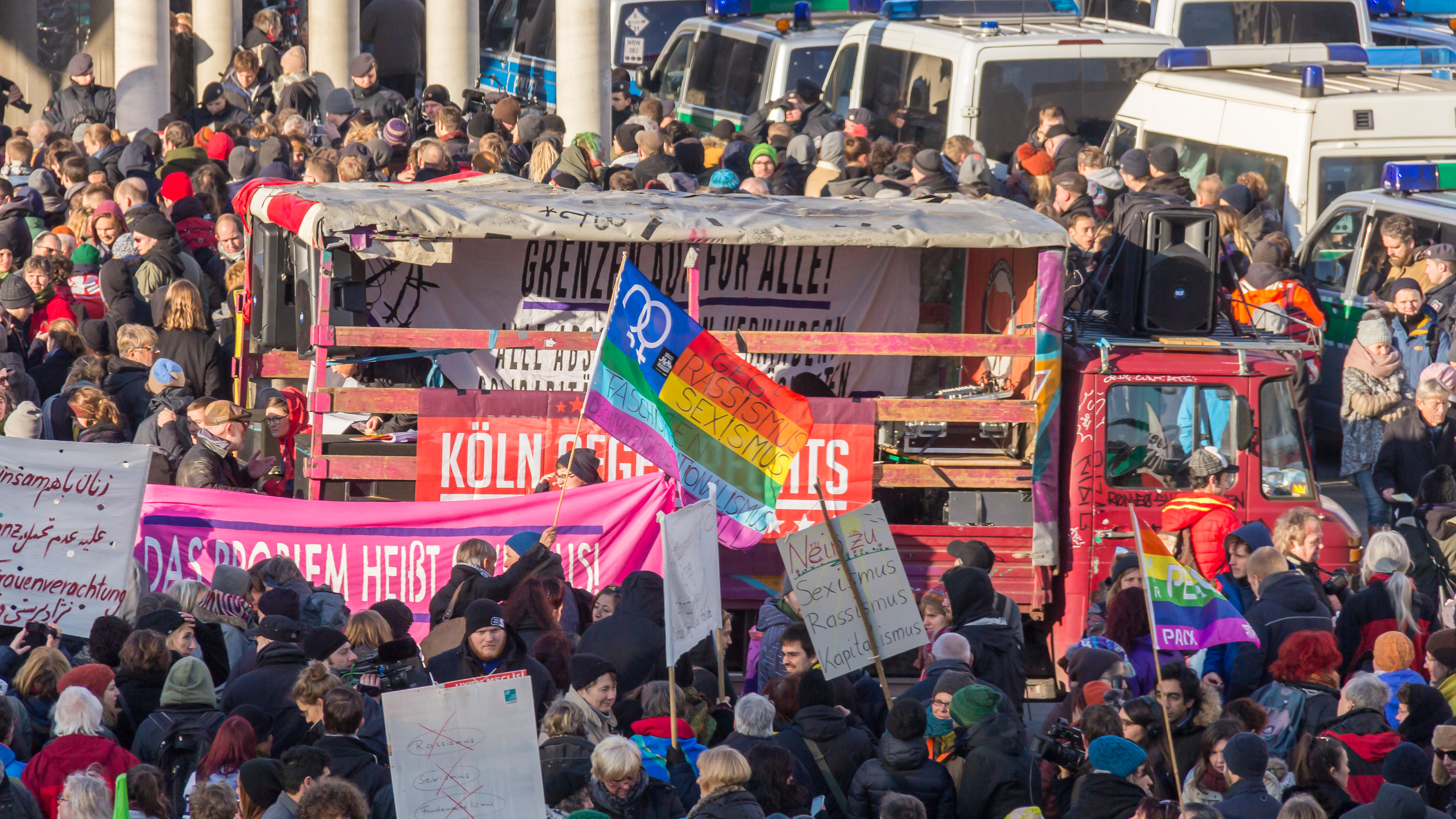
A pro-immigration rally in Cologne, Germany on 6 January 2016 following the aftermath of the New Year's Eve sexual assaults in Germany.

Germany – In 2013, Germany received 11,851 asylum requests by Syrians, in 2014 the number more than tripled to 39,332. The German Federal Minister of the Interior estimated in March 2015, that some 105,000 Syrian refugees have been accepted by Germany. By June 2015, 161,435 Syrians resided in Germany, of which 136,835 had entered after January 2011. After suspending the Dublin rules for Syrian refugees, the numbers increased to the point of stressing Germany's infrastructure and logistics capabilities. From January to July 2015, the Federal office for migration and refugees received 42,100 requests for asylum. By the end of 2015, the figure had reached 158,657. 96% of the asylum requests were approved. German Chancellor Angela Merkel said that "The fundamental right to asylum for the politically persecuted knows no upper limit; that also goes for refugees who come to us from the hell of a civil war." Even though her government decided to let all Syrians enter the country, they temporarily had to stop train travel to/from Austria to control the high numbers arriving. At Munich's main railway station, thousands of Germans applauded Syrians as they arrived in September.

The German police force announced on 22 October 2015 that they had prevented a planned attack on a refugee home in Bamberg by a right-wing extremist group. They also said there had been nearly 600 attacks on refugee homes in 2015, a sharp rise from 2014. As well, 19–39,000 (depending on estimates) of members of the German right-wing Pegida movement rallied on 19 October 2015 in Dresden against accepting refugees. Some 14–20,000 other individuals held a counterrally in the city. Angela Merkel's openness towards refugees was criticized and 61% of respondents in an INSA poll reported they were less happy about accepting refugees after the assaults. In September, German customs seized packages of fake Syrian passports which police suspect are being sold to non-Syrians seeking asylum in Germany.

In April 2020, two former high-ranking members of the Syrian Army went on trial in Koblenz, Rhineland-Palatinate, Germany, for alleged war crimes committed during the Syrian Civil War. This was the first time that Syrian military officials are being prosecuted for their roles in the conflict.

By the end of 2022, 1,016,000 Syrian migrants lived in Germany. In 2026, German Chancellor Friedrich Merz said Germany and Syria hoped most Syrians in Germany would return within three years, as the end of the civil war meant their need for protection should be reassessed.

Greece – Greece welcomes refugees when in transit to Germany to apply for refugee status. In 2015, there were 385,525 arrivals by sea. It is estimated that only 8% of arrivals (31,000 Syrian refugees) applied for asylum in Greece, as most are in transit further into Europe. The Greek government sought to use the refugee crisis to extract additional economic aid from the EU with poor results. 15,000–17,000 refugees had landed on Lesbos island by September 2015, overwhelming the resources and generosity of local residents. Many refugees also make landfall at Agathonisi, Farmakonisi, Kos, Lemnos, Leros, Rhodes, Chios, Samos, Symi, Kastellorizo and other islands near Turkey. Some arrive via the Evros border crossing from Turkey. On 19 February 2016 Austria imposed restrictions on the number of refugees entering the country followed by Slovenia, Croatia, Serbia and North Macedonia, of just 580 arrivals a day. As a result, large numbers of Syrian refugees and migrants from other countries are stuck in Greece. On 22 February 2016 at an emergency summit on the migrant crisis in Brussels it was agreed that another 100,000 spaces in refugee reception centres will be created. There was also 50,000 spaces in Greece and another 50,000 spaces in Balkan countries created. Given that 2 – 3,000 migrants arrive in Greece every day, these 100,000 spaces look inadequate.

On 18 June 2016, UN chief Ban Ki-moon praised Greece for showing "remarkable solidarity and compassion" towards refugees and he also called for international support.

After the 2016 Turkish coup d'état attempt in July 2016, Greek authorities on a number of Aegean Islands have called for emergency measures to curtail a growing flow of refugees from Turkey, the number of migrants and refugees willing to make the journey across the Aegean has increased noticeably. At Athens officials voiced worries that Turkish monitors overseeing the deal in Greece had been abruptly pulled out after the failed coup with little sign of them being replaced. The Association of Greek Tourism Enterprises (SETE) warned about the prospect of another flare-up in the refugee/migrant crisis due to the Turkish political instability.

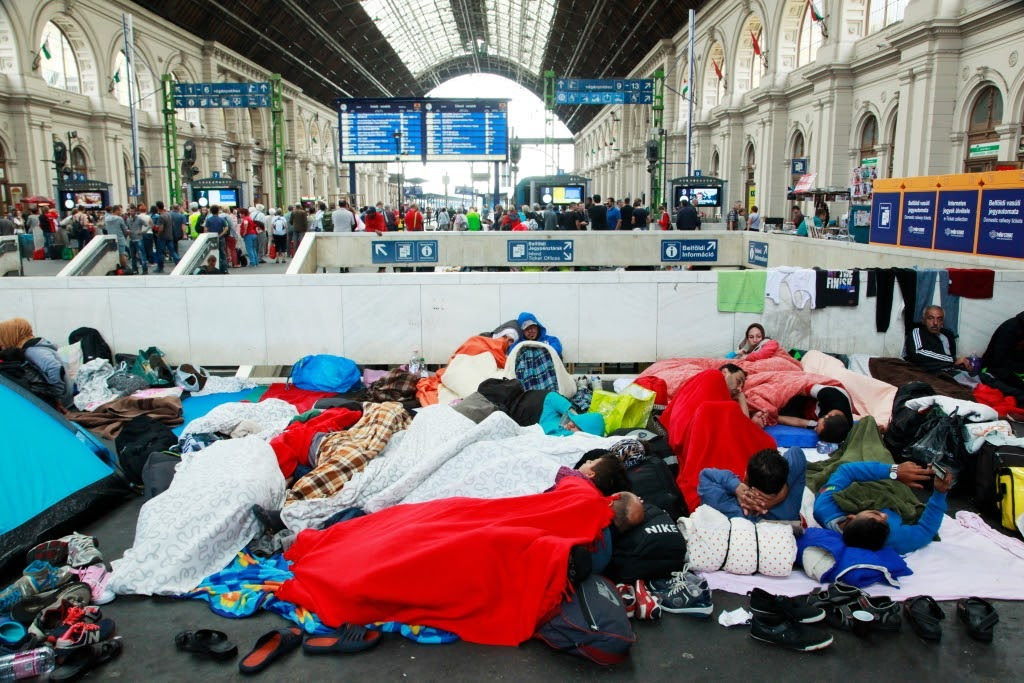
Syrian refugees at Budapest Keleti railway station, 4 September 2015

Hungary – Hungary welcomes refugees when in transit to Germany to apply for refugee status. In the summer of 2015, Hungary was deeply affected by the migration crisis. In December, Hungary challenged EU plans to share asylum seekers across EU states at the European Court of Justice. The border has been closed since 15 September 2015, with razor wire fence along its southern borders, particularly Croatia, and by blocking train travel. The government believes that "illegal migrants" are job-seekers, threats to security and likely to "threaten our culture". There have been cases of immigrants and ethnic minorities being attacked. The country has conducted wholesale deportations of refugees, who are generally considered to be allied with ISIL. Refugees are outlawed and almost all are ejected.

Iceland – Iceland announced it would accept 50 Syrian refugees.

Italy – In 2013, the UNHCR estimates that more than 4,600 refugees arrive in Italy by sea, two-thirds of whom arrive in August.

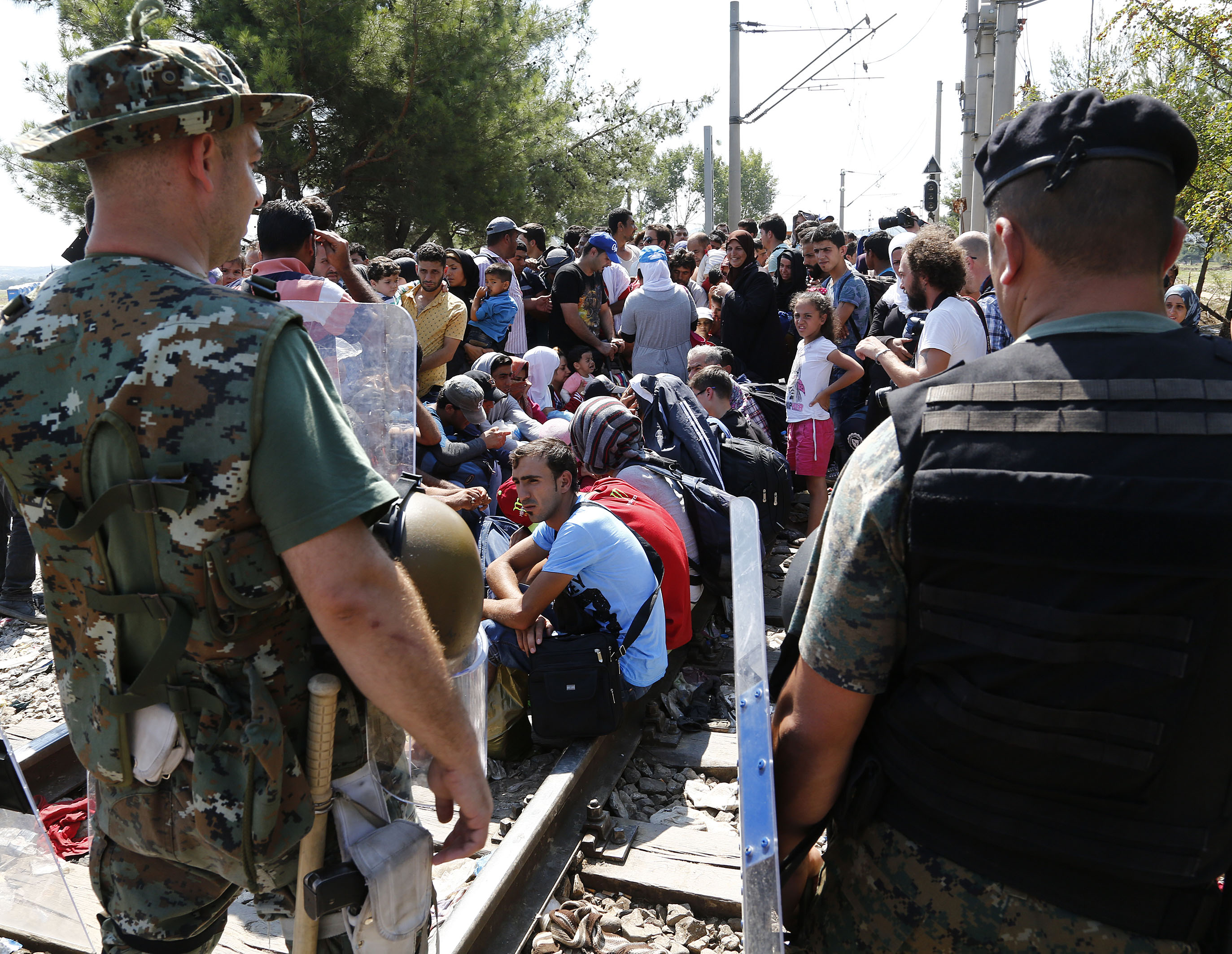
Syrian refugees wait to cross the Greek-Macedonian border at Gevgelija, 24 August 2015

North Macedonia – North Macedonia welcomes refugees if they do not stay permanently within the country and instead go to Germany to apply for refugee status. In summer of 2015, North Macedonia becomes one of the most affected European countries by migration crisis, along with Hungary, Serbia, Italy and Greece.

Netherlands – The government condemned the fire bombing of an immigrant reception centre in October 2015. In the small town of Geldermalsen, over 2,000 protested immigration in mid December 2015.

Norway – Norway has announced it will accept 8,000 refugees from Syria under the UN quota system by the end of 2017.

Poland –Poland has accepted 150 mostly Christian refugees. Various centre right, far right, and conservative parties won parliamentary elections on platforms demanding a halt to refugee quotas.

Romania – The European Commission asked Romania to accept 6,351 refugees under an EU quota scheme. Bloomberg News reported that "Romania's government will call on the EU to grant its citizens equal access to the visa-free Schengen area if the bloc's leaders impose mandatory quotas on its members to shelter refugees."

Russia – The Russian government gave $24 million for refugees and granted asylum to over 1,000. About 5,000 refugees have settled in Russia since 2012. Five hundred Christian refugees settled in Sochi. Circassians in Syria have been returning to their historic homelands in Circassia. The Chechen and Ossetian diasporas in Syria have also sought to return to their Caucasus homelands.

Serbia – Serbia welcomes refugees when in transit to western Europe to apply for refugee status. In August 2015, Vučić said that Serbia will do anything to help these people on their way to better life. He promised more toilets for them, blankets, food and announced opening of the temporary reception centre in Belgrade during winter months. He also drew comparisons between the Syrian refugees and Croatian Serb refugees "who also had to leave their homes 20 years ago", positing that because Serbs suffered then, they understand the problems that the refugees face.

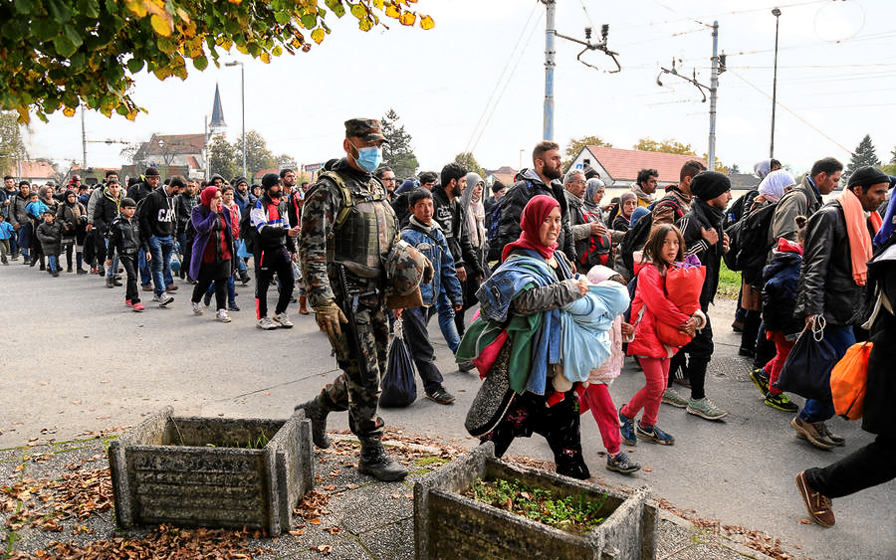
Syrian refugees and migrants pass through Slovenia, 23 October 2015

Slovenia – Originally, Slovenia welcomed refugees when in transit to Germany to apply for refugee status. As of September 2015, however, Slovenia has reportedly considered housing "up to 10,000" refugees, as well as creating new passageways through the country for refugees in response to increasing tensions at its border with Croatia.

Slovakia – Slovakia has refused to accept refugees from Turkey (who are nearly all Syrians), although in December 2015 it did voluntarily accept 500 asylum seekers on a temporary basis and 149 Assyrian Christian families who came via Iraq The Slovak government has threatened lawsuits against the EU because of the controversial refugee quota system which requires Slovakia to accept just under 2,300 migrants.

Sweden – In September 2013, Sweden becomes the first EU country to grant permanent residency to all asylum seekers, and the right to family reunification, in light of worsening conditions in Syria. Roughly 8,000 Syrian refugees in Sweden are affected by the ruling. The decision was welcomed by the Syrian Arabian Cultural Association of Sweden, but they also warned that it may be a boon for people-smuggling operations and lead to political controversy.

In September 2013, Swedish migration authorities ruled that all asylum seekers will be granted permanent residency and the right to bring their families as well. Sweden is the first EU-country to make this offer. The number of Syrian nationals settling in Sweden under refugee status was 2,943 in 2012, 9,755 in 2013, and 18,827 in 2014, summing up to a total increase of 31,525 refugees during this period. Additionally, another 9,028 Syrians settled in Sweden on grounds of family reunification. Moreover, during this period, Sweden has received over 10,000 stateless persons, many of whom are refugees that previously resided in Syria.

In 2015, 51,338 Syrians applied for asylum in Sweden. After 2015 the number of Syrian asylum seekers decreased drastically, totaling 5,459 in 2016, 4,718 in 2017, and 1,040 as of May 2018.

Switzerland – In March 2012, the United Nations Office of the High Commissioner for Human Rights made a request to Switzerland to accept some Syrian refugees, and the Swiss government announced that it was considering the request. In March 2015, the Swiss Federal Council set a goal of accepting 3,000 Syrian refugees over three years. By September 2015, 5,000 Syrian refugees had received provisional permission to live in Switzerland, and an additional 2,000 had submitted asylum applications and were pending.

United Kingdom – The UK has so far granted asylum to 5,102 refugees of whom 216 have been actively resettled. The stance of its government has been severely criticised by human rights groups. In September, the government announced plans to accept 20,000 refugees over a period of 5 years, taken from refugee camps in Lebanon, Turkey, and Jordan. In May 2015, a YouGov poll commissioned by British charity Islamic Relief showed that 42% of respondents said Britain should not take in foreign nationals fleeing conflict or persecution in their own countries, up sharply on 2014. The poll also showed that terrorism was associated with Muslims, with the words "terror", "terrorist" or "terrorism" chosen by 12% of respondents, ahead of other options like faith (11%), mosque (9%), Koran (8%) and religious (8%). Prime Minister David Cameron described Syrian refugees coming to the UK as a "swarm", and later said he would not "allow people to break into our country". The Foreign Secretary also said refugees were "marauding" around Calais. Amnesty International and opposition party leadership have criticized these statements by the government. On 4 September 2015, Cameron pledged that the UK would accept "thousands" more Syrian refugees. Wimbledon UKIP candidate Peter Bucklitsch, sparked online outrage amongst Twitter users on 3 September 2015 when he stated deceased Syrian refugee child Alan Kurdi was "well clothed & well fed", and blamed his parents for the death. He stated Aylan died because his parents were "greedy for the good life in Europe". High-profile figures such as Liberal Democrat leader Tim Farron denounced the remarks. He apologised online the next day. A statement a day later contained an apology from Buckslitsch. He described his tweet as "inelegant" and stated that blaming parents was probably "not ... the best response." In November 2018, A sixteen year old youth was shown on video assaulting a Syrian refugee in a playground attack in Almondbury Community School, West Yorkshire.

== In North America ==
=== Canada ===
In July 2013, Canada promised to resettle 1,300 refugees by 2015 and pledged $100 million in humanitarian aid. "1,063 Syrian refugees are already here in Canada. The rest will travel in the coming weeks" (Kevin Menard, spokesman for Immigration Minister Chris Alexander). and the government agreed to resettle 11,300 refugees by the end of 2017, and then 10,000 by September 2016. Before the 2015 federal election, the Liberal Party of Canada promised to bring 25,000 refugees by the end of 2015. After the election, the newly formed Liberal government failed to meet its self-imposed deadline and it was moved to February 2016 and began further screening in the aftermath of the 2015 Paris attacks. Canadians have expressed considerable interest in receiving refugees and Canadian politicians and business leaders, including Prime Minister Justin Trudeau met the first two flights on 10 and 13 December 2015. At the end of 2015, Canada had arranged 96 flights to airlift refugees from their host countries, welcomed 35,000 refugees into 275 communities across the country, and agreed to resettle 35–50,000 refugees by the end of 2016. Resettlement arrangements for additional refugees and social integration of arriving refugees is ongoing. The cost over the subsequent six years was estimated between Can$564 to Can$678 million. Justin Trudeau stated that the most vulnerable would be accepted first, including families, children and members of the LGBT communities. Among the Syrian refugees accepted for resettlement are thousands of ethnic Armenians. On 27 February 2016 Canada met its goal of resettling 25,000 Syrian refugees. Canada continues to process applications and had accepted 40,081 refugees from November 2015 to January 2017. The government maintains at least two programmes for resettlement: refugees can be sponsored either under the Government-Assisted Refugee (GAR) programme, or under the Private Sponsorship of Refugees Program (PSR).

=== United States ===
==== President Barack Obama administration ====
In late September 2016, the U.S. surpassed its initial goal of resettling 10,000 Syrian refugees by resettling over 12,500 refugees throughout the U.S. Most of this initial grouping were admitted to the U.S. in the previous four months leading up to this announcement. The Obama administration also came out saying that it anticipated the resettling of an additional 110,000 refugees, according to an article from the Washington Post. Syrians made up only a small fraction (2%) of total U.S. refugee intake in the fiscal year 2015. According to the United States Department of State Refugee Admissions Report dated December 2016, the US admitted 1,682 Syrian refugees in Fiscal Year 2015 (year ending Sept 2015), 12,587 in FY 2016 (15% of total worldwide refugee admissions into the US in FY 2016) and 3,566 Syrian refugees for the period October through December 2016.

At the United Nations Leader's Summit on Refugees on 20 September 2016, President Obama urged countries to "fulfill a moral obligation" to help the current refugee crisis, and called the circumstances of the 4.8 million refugees from Syria "particularly unacceptable".

Following the November 2015 Paris attacks, thirty-one U.S. state governments (all but one led by a Republican governor) protested the admission of Syrian refugees to their states, with some seeking to block their admission. These governors' efforts to block Syrian refugees have been unsuccessful in court, and most but not all of the governors "seem to have quietly dropped the matter."

Under his administration, the U.S. government has provided $5.9 billion to aid Syrian refugees, making the United States as the second-largest donor of Syrian refugees after Turkey.

==== President Donald Trump administration ====
On 27 January 2017, new US President Donald Trump announced that he had signed an executive order suspending any further resettlement of Syrian refugees to the United States indefinitely until further notice due to security concerns (excluding "refugee claims made by individuals on the basis of religious-based persecution, provided that the religion of the individual is a minority religion in the individual's country of nationality" which could include Christians, Shia Muslims and Yazidis in Syria). It will resume once an enhanced security screening procedure is implemented. Two days before signing the executive order, President Trump said that he was interested in establishing safe zones in Syrian territory, allowing refugees to live there while fleeing violence and stated that the European countries have "made a tremendous mistake by admitting millions of refugees from Syria and other Middle Eastern trouble spots" during the 2015 European migrant crisis. In July 2017, President Trump along with Lebanese Prime Minister Saad Hariri agreed on US support to Lebanon to "supporting the humanitarian needs of displaced Syrian citizens as close to their home country as possible." It was also announced in April of that same year that the US would send $167 million for Lebanese support.

While some supports advocate that Donald Trump's new suspension of resettlement was done to help protect the safety of the United States, a large portion are skeptical of the long-term results of the suspension. According to opponents of the plan, the suspension can be described as "ill-conceived, poorly implemented and ill-explained." This group of critics even includes two prominent Republicans, Michael Hayden and John McLaughlin. The critics argue that, since 11 September 2001, there have been no terrorist attacks in the U.S. that have been caused by any of the people banned by the order. In addition, they say that the suspension could compromise U.S. troops fighting overseas and that it provides propaganda for terrorist organizations like ISIS, as it allows them to proclaim that the U.S. has anti-Islam tendencies. The U.S. 9th Circuit Court of Appeals has said in Washington v. Trump, that the travel ban is not constitutional, but Trump has stated he will continue to try and make it a reality. On 4 December, the United States Supreme Court ruled in favor of supporting the Trump administrations third installment of the travel ban. This decision will allow full enforcement of the ban to continue after US courts blocked the first two measures of the controversial regulation of travelers. The ban will allow the Trump administration to heavily regulate migration from countries such as Chad, Iran, Libya, North Korea, Somalia, Venezuela, Yemen and Syria. This comes after President Trump's loss in October from his second ban being blocked by federal judges in Maryland and Hawaii. Active cases against the ban are currently in the lower courts and could dictate if President Trump's third attempt at his travel ban could still be enforced or deemed unconstitutional like his original two efforts. Advocates against the ban include the American Civil Liberties Union which represent several groups challenging the ban and will continue to do so with American Civil Liberties Union's director Omar Jadwat saying "President Trump's anti-Muslim prejudice is no secret."

In the 2016 Fiscal Year, the US dramatically increased the number of refugees admitted from Syria, totaling 12,587 refugees from the war-torn country. Ninety-nine percent of these refugees were Muslims (with few Shia Muslims admitted) and approximately one percent were Christian according to the Pew Research Center analysis of State Department Refugee Processing Center data. The religious breakdown of Syria's 17.2 million people is approximately 74% Sunni Islam, 13% Alawi, Ismaili and Shia Islam, 10% Christian and 3% Druze.

The state of religious persecution in the country is described by the State Department: "In Syria, the Assad regime increased its targeting and surveillance of members of a variety of faith groups it deemed a "threat," especially members of the country's Sunni majority. This occurred concurrently with the escalation of violent extremist activity targeted against religious minorities, including Christians, Druze, Alawites, and others as the current civil war continues. Large scale internal and external displacement of all sectors of the population is ongoing"

In 2017, the US accepted 3,024 Syrian refugees, but only accepted 11 in the first quarter of 2018

==== Public opinion on Syrian refugees ====
The topic of US involvement in alleviating the Syrian refugee crisis continues to be a highly contentious issue among legislators, stakeholders, and activists. As instability in the region continues to rise, and the number of people seeking refuge continues to increase, the topic of whether or not to admit Syrian refugees into the United States continues to have a pervasive hold on American affairs, both foreign and domestic. However, the presence of refugees in a country can present opportunities for the state to develop capacity in more marginalized areas.

The issue of whether or not to admit Syrian refugees into the US has long been classified as a partisan issue, and the poll results affirm this position. In 2016, 56% of Democrats supported admitting Syrian refugees into the US, compared with 18% of Republicans and 32% of independents. Since the Syrian Refugee Crisis, the United States citizens have been formulating opinions on how to deal with the refugee crisis.

In a CNN/ORC poll conducted in November 2015 when responding to the question "Do you favor or oppose allowing refugees from Syria to seek asylum in the United States? ... Do you favor/oppose that strongly or just somewhat?" 16% of people were strongly in favor, 22% somewhat in favor, 18% somewhat opposed, 43% strongly opposed, and 1% were unsure. Another poll was conducted again in Jan–Feb 2017, asking the same question. This time, 25% of people were strongly in favor, 29% somewhat in favor, 18% somewhat opposed, 27% strongly opposed, and 2% were unsure (margin of error of about 3). These polls show a shift towards more favourable opinions towards letting in Syrian refugees over this period.

In Duke University Law School's Academic Journal, Suman Momin wrote an article entitled A Human Rights Based Approach to Refugees: A Look at the Syrian Refugee Crisis and Responses from Germany and the United States. Momin lays out the most common moral and intrinsic arguments that affect citizens' opinions on refugee issues such as the Syrian Refugee Crisis. Momin introduces the "Good Samaritan" argument, the protection argument, and the political responsibility argument. The Good Samaritan argument states that people are in favor of helping non-citizens who are refugees as long as they believe that by helping, their own country will not be sacrificing anything. The protection argument stems from the idea that humans care about the rights and lives of others. This argument means that people pay attention to emotional debates that use photos of refugees or play at emotional connections, making people want to protect or save refugees. Finally, the political responsibility argument states that people are more willing to help when they think providing aid or letting in refugees with advance their own country politically. Where Americans stand on these moral rationales is what influences their opinion of foreign policy issues towards Syrian refugees.

In a Quinnipiac University Poll from 16 February through 21 February 2016, responding to the question "Do you support or oppose accepting Syrian refugees into the U.S.?", 74% of Democrats and 43% of Independents were in support of Syrian refugees coming to the US while only 13% of Republicans were in support. 82% of Republicans were opposed to Syrian refugees coming to the US, 51% of Independents and 22% of Democrats. 4% to 5% of people in each party had no answer. The poll had a margin of error of plus or minus 2.9. This poll indicates that Democrats are largely in favor of Syrian refugees entering the US while Republicans are largely opposed and considering the margin of error, Independents are completely split on the issue.

In another poll taken by Gallup on 30 and 31 January 2017 Gallup asked people "Thinking now about some of the specific actions Donald Trump has taken since he has been in office, would you say you approve or disapprove of indefinitely suspending the United States' Syrian refugee program" 32% of people approved Trump's actions suspending the Syrian refugee program 62% of people disapproved and 6% of people were unsure (margin of error of plus or minus 4).

== In South America ==
Argentina – Argentina decided in September 2013 to offer refuge to thousands of displaced Syrians. As of August 2013, more than three hundred refugee families have already arrived in Argentina. In 2016, as a result of the intensifying conflict in Syria, Argentina offered to accept 3,000 refugees.

Brazil – Brazil is the first country in the Americas to offer humanitarian visas to refugees. Brazil's embassies in countries neighboring Syria issue travel visas and allow for claims on arrival in Brazil. These special humanitarian visas will also be provided to family members living in countries neighbouring Syria. As of November 2015, there are 3,000 Syrian refugees in Brazil.

Colombia – Colombia accepts refugees that have asked for asylum within Colombia. The refugees are registered with the UNHCR in Bogotá, and receive aid from Pastoral Social, a Colombian NGO that works closely with the UNHCR.

Uruguay – As of October 2014, more than 100 Syrian refugees are in Uruguay. However, those Syrians resettled in Uruguay want to go back and leave Uruguay.

Venezuela – In September 2015, Venezuelan President Nicolás Maduro announced that Venezuela is prepared to give asylum to 20,000 refugees in the wake of the European migrant crisis and Venezuela–Colombia migrant crisis. President Maduro defended his decision by asking "how many more Arabs must die before a great human conscience of peace is awakened?". The Venezuelan government supported President Bashar al-Assad when the Syrian civil war started in 2011 and described the conflict as a Western "imperialist" plot to topple him.

== In the Asia-Pacific region ==
Australia – In October 2015, Australia announced that it would accept 12,000 Syrian refugees. By February 2016, Australia had settled 26 refugees. By September 2016, 3,532 people had been resettled, with a further 3,146 visas issued. In addition, another 6,293 people were undergoing health, character and security checks after undergoing interviews.

Hong Kong – In September 2015, the South China Morning Post reported that a Syrian refugee traveled 7,000 km to Hong Kong to seek asylum. The Hong Kong Immigration Department confirmed that the Syrian has filed a non-refoulement claim, which includes both torture and refugee applications with the government, and was later granted refugee status in February 2017. The city has a history of accepting the fewest asylum seekers and refugees with an acceptance rate of 0.6% as compared with 60% in Europe. As of December 2016, only 72 asylum seekers have their claims recognized by the Hong Kong authorities while many of them wait several years to have their claims screened.

India – In September 2015, there were 39 Syrian refugees and 20 asylum seekers seeking registration with the UNHCR in India. Most of them were living in South Delhi.

Japan – In February 2017, The government announced that Japan will accept a total of 300 refugees over 5 years. Japan has only been processing the applications by strictly abiding by the refugee convention, while many countries in Europe, which have seen a sharp increase in Syrian asylum seekers in recent years, have been broadening their refugee definitions and support for asylum seekers. Four Syrian asylum seekers initiated a lawsuit against the Japanese government to seek official refugee status after they were denied refugee status but have been granted tentative residence permits.

Malaysia – In October 2015, Malaysian Prime Minister Najib Razak announced that at least 3,000 Syrian refugees would be resettled in the country. Malaysia is the first Muslim-majority country to make this offer. Najib stated that Muslim countries were partly responsible for ensuring the well-being of the marginalised Syrians fleeing their country in massive numbers, causing social and economic stresses in Europe, during the migrant crisis. The first batch of refugees arrived at Kuala Lumpur International Airport on 11 December 2015 on a flight arriving from Istanbul, Turkey. The second batch of 68 Syrian refugees arrived at the Subang Air Force Base (outside of Kuala Lumpur) from Beirut, Lebanon in May 2016. In late December 2016, many of the refugees are found begging on the streets of Kuala Lumpur. As of May 2017, around 1,980 Syrian refugees have been registered in Malaysia with the UNHCR.

New Zealand – New Zealand has admitted 83 refugees, and announced a further 750 will be accepted.

South Korea – South Korea has refused to offer any resettlement places to refugees. The number of Syrian refugees who have applied for asylum in South Korea number 918 in total since 1994, expected to grow to over 1,000 by the end of 2015. There were only 3 applicants before 2011, but the number greatly increased due to the Syrian civil war in 2011. At the end of September 2015, the Ministry of Justice in South Korea said there are 848 Syrian asylum seekers in South Korea. Of those, 3 asylum seekers were accepted as refugees, which is an acceptance rate of less than 0.3%. 631 people were permitted their residence on humanitarian grounds, 9 people decided not to accept refugee status and 75 withdrew their application; in total, 718 people had their status determined. The remaining 130 Syrians are still having their status determined. South Korea has been giving aid to Syrian refugees for a few years. The Korean government and NGOs provided support to set up about 2,000 refugee tents in Zaatari, Jordan. There are small parts called 'Korean villages' in the camp, where refugees can learn 'Taekwondo', Korean martial arts and can enroll in some education programs. The Korean government said that "it has spent $27 million in aiding refugees from Syria, Iraq, Afghanistan and South Sudan etc. in 2015".

Turkmenistan – Since July 1985, some Syrian refugees have been going to Turkmenistan because of the political relations between Turkmenistan and Syria. There is also a community of 55 Turkmenistanis in Syria.

== Financial aid ==
Financial aid from government, non-government, and private donors to support Syrian refugees is largely channeled through established aid organizations, and national government agencies. These organizations and agencies deliver aid directly to refugees in the form of food, education, housing, clothing and medical care, along with migration and resettlement services. Complete figures for aid delivery since 2011 are not available. The table below shows cumulative known aid delivered by the largest aid organizations, between April 2011 and December 2015.

United Nations agencies
| Food and Agriculture Organization | FAO | 42,103,122 |
| Office for the Coordination of Humanitarian Affairs | OCHA | 412,587,348 |
| United Nations Children's Emergency Fund | UNICEF | 1,339,721,581 |
| United Nations Development Program | UNDP | 76,904,986 |
| United Nations Educational, Scientific and Cultural Organization | UNESCO | 16,275,456 |
| United Nations Higher Commissioner for Refugees | UNHCR | 2,928,091,009 |
| United Nations Population Fund | UNPF | 51,352,953 |
| United Nations Relief and Works Agency for Palestine Refugees in the Near East | UNRWA | 687,533,705 |
| World Food Programme | WFP | 3,127,400,730 |
| World Health Organization | WHO | 225,102,831 |
Intergovernmental Organizations
| International Organization for Migration | IOM | 169,490,783 |
International Non-Governmental Organizations
| CARE International | CARE | 50,733,320 |
| Handicap International | | 50,857,464 |
| International Committee of the Red Cross | ICRC | 119,327,373 |
| International Federation of Red Cross and Red Crescent Societies | IFRC | 28,615,689 |
| International Medical Corps | IMC | 44,176,262 |
| International Rescue Committee | IRC | 40,880,550 |
| Mercy Corps | Mercy Corps | 79,182,554 |
| Oxfam | Oxfam | 53,150,962 |
| Save the Children International | | 89,549,837 |
International Religious Organizations
| ACT Alliance (Ecumenical) | ACT | 17,301,378 |
| Caritas International (Roman Catholic) | CARITAS | 44,291,764 |
National Organizations
| Danish Refugee Council (Denmark) | DRC | 111,383,440 |
| IHH Humanitarian Relief Foundation (Turkey) | IHH | 84,026,099 |
| Islamic Relief Worldwide (UK) | IRW | 63,951,290 |
| Norwegian Refugee Council | NRC | 160,106,509 |
| Première Urgence (France) | | 44,403,652 |
| Red Cross (7 branches) | | 47,535,819 |
| Red Crescent (6 branches) | | 145,198,574 |

| Donor | Funding to December 2015 (in USD) |
|---|---|
| World | 17,029,967,564 |
| Turkey | 8,000,000,000 |
| United States | 4,662,407,369 |
| European Union | 1,834,305,296 |
| United Kingdom | 1,553,345,642 |
| Germany | 1,296,228,090 |
| Kuwait | 1,035,624,326 |
| Private | 1,017,484,080 |
| Canada | 969,710,000 |
| Saudi Arabia | 737,120,785 |
| Japan | 447,688,208 |
| UAE | 435,868,141 |
| Norway | 356,803,764 |
| Netherlands | 338,491,157 |
| United Nations | 247,344,198 |
| Qatar | 236,891,320 |
| Switzerland | 211,962,092 |
| Denmark | 203,691,497 |
| Sweden | 193,258,749 |
| Australia | 176,605,888 |
| France | 150,236,015 |
| Italy | 111,443,572 |

Figures above are donations to international organizations as compiled by the Financial Tracking Service, of the United Nations Office for the Coordination of Humanitarian Affairs Not included are: government spending on domestic hosting and resettlement. Private donations are from individuals and organizations. United Nations' donations are from unearmarked funds not attributable to specific member states. Figures for Turkey include expenditures not tracked by the FTS.

== Depiction in media ==
In 2017, the Finnish comedy-drama film The Other Side of Hope features a Syrian asylum seeker looking for his sister in Finland while being taken in by an aspiring Finnish restaurateur. In the same year, the Turkish drama film The Guest: Aleppo-Istanbul tells the story of an eight-year-old Syrian girl and her toddler sister who were orphaned during the war and seeking refuge with other Syrians in Istanbul. The 2023 British drama film The Old Oak features Syrian refugees assisting a British pub owner in restoring his titular pub after it declined during a rough economy.

== Post-Assad returns ==
In December 2025, the International Organization for Migration documented that over 782,075 Syrians returned to Syria from abroad since the fall of the Assad regime in December 2024.

Syrians returning to Syria December 2024-December 2025 per Governorate
| Amount | Governorate |
|---|---|
| 170,098 | Aleppo Governorate |
| 134,406 | Homs Governorate |
| 124,447 | Rif Dimashq Governorate |
| 85,272 | Idlib Governorate |
| 84,843 | Deraa Governorate |
| 52,542 | Hama Governorate |
| 34,859 | Damascus Governorate |
| 23,309 | Al-Hasakah Governorate |
| 20,859 | Deir ez-Zor Governorate |
| 19,245 | Raqqa Governorate |
| 18,450 | Lakatia Governorate |
| 5,718 | Tartus Governorate |
| 5,679 | Suwayda Governorate |
| 2,348 | Quneitra Governorate (excluding Israeli occupied Golan Heights) |
| 782,075 | Total |

=== Lebanon ===
In July 2025 Lebanon launched its Syrian refugee return plan along with the UNHCR and the International Organization for Migration (IOM), in order to create suitable solution for the Syrian refugees living in Lebanon. The Organized Voluntary Return Plan aims to help between 200,000 and 400,000 to return to their homes in Syria. The plan is led by Deputy Prime Minister Tarek Mitri and carried out by Lebanon's General Security.

=== Netherlands ===
Over 950 Syrians returned home in 2025, aided by Dutch government financial support programs.

== See also ==
- Return of refugees of the Syrian civil war
- Spillover of the Syrian civil war
- Syrian diaspora

== Sources ==
- This article incorporates text from a free content work. Licensed under CC BY-SA 3.0 IGO. Text taken from A Lifeline to learning: leveraging mobile technology to support education for refugees, UNESCO. UNESCO.

== Bibliography ==
- Seale, P. (2012). What is really happening in Syria. The Washington Report on Middle East Affairs, 31(5), 17–18.
- Panico, A. (2017). I don't have dreams – Childhood LostAn investigation on the effects of the EU-Turkey deal: child labour. Meltingpot.
