= Shakespeare Hirst =

English actor and writer (1841–1907)

- Born: 26 February 1841; Almondbury, Yorkshire, England
- Died: 20 May 1907 (aged 66); Huddersfield, Yorkshire, England
- Occupations: Actor, Author, Art Collector, Weaver, Elocutionist, Innkeeper
- Relatives: Henry Hirst (father), Mary Shaw (mother), George Hirst (brother), Mary Ann Hirst (sister)

Shakespeare Hirst (26 February 1841 – 20 May 1907) was an English actor, author, art collector and expert on the life and works of William Shakespeare.

== Life ==
=== Early life ===
Shakespeare Hirst was the son of Henry Hirst and Mary Shaw, both of whom were woollen weavers. He was born in Almondbury, Yorkshire, and baptised there on 11 April 1841. While there are no records as to where Hirst was educated, the 1851 England Census Record does list him as a "scholar". Hirst had a brother, George and a sister, Ann.

=== Acting career ===
Hirst's stage debut saw him giving dramatic Shakespeare recitals at the age of twenty in what was once the "old Gymnasium Hall" in Huddersfield. His first performance saw recitals from Shakespeare's works; As You Like It, Hamlet and King John. An anonymous contemporary remarked of Hirst's King John recital:

"The scene between Hubert and Prince Arthur was admirably rendered, and the difficult task of representing the two characters, so very dissimilar, was ably accomplished by Mr. Hirst, whose rich voice and clear enunciation are well suited for the parts he sustained." - The Huddersfield Examiner, 6 August 1934

Hirst went on to tour the country with his own stock company, including the manager of the Huddersfield Theatre Royal, Mr. J. W. White. Hirst's preferred Shakespearean role was that of Othello and notably, once played the character alongside famous German actor Herr Bandmann as Iago. The last character Hirst played before retiring from the stage was Hamlet.

=== The Shakespeare Inn ===
Shakespeare Hirst inherited his father Henry's inn, 'The Shakespeare Hotel' on 1 March 1880. Hirst held recitals of the bard's works at eight o'clock every Sunday evening and these were attended by people from across the area. Each recital generally lasted an hour and no drinks were served during performances.

Hirst held an annual banquet to celebrate the birth of the bard which also included recitals, as well as exhibitions of artefacts relating to Shakespeare, including the infamous Elsheimer portrait.

=== The Elsheimer Portrait ===
Much controversy arose around Hirst's claims of owning an original Adam Elsheimer portrait of William Shakespeare. According to a 1903 interview, the painting was traded for cloth by a tailor in Huddersfield from a Jewish importer. When the tailor died, it was sold to a friend of Hirst's who consequently sold it to Hirst himself.

The portrait was supposed to have been painted by Elsheimer during Shakespeare's 1608 visit to Rome. It attracted visitors to the Shakespeare Inn from across the country.

"The painting is of a handsome bearded man, with brown eyes and wavy hair. A large white collar of the time and a brown doublet are all the clothing shown.". - The Huddersfield Examiner, 6 August 1934

Hirst took great pride in his art collection, boasting a 225 strong selection of oil painting, apparently including the works of Raphael, Cimabue, Leonardo, Rubens, and of course, Elsheimer.

=== Family ===
Hirst married Mary Ann Smethurst in Huddersfield, in 1876. They had five children; Cordelia, Henry, Ophelia, Shakespeare Elsheimer and Miranda.

=== Death ===
Hirst died of heart failure on 20 May 1907. An auction took place to sell off his painting collection, but with so much controversy surrounding the genuineness of the artefacts, the auction only fetched £1,000, a mere fraction of the total that would have been if supported with evidence of authenticity.

=== Books ===
Hirst also wrote a number of books on William Shakespeare, known to include:

- Old And New Lines, From Various Sources, In The Life Of William Shakespeare (1884)
- The Life Of Adam Elsheimer, Painter, etc. (1884)
- The Most Marvellous Art Sensation In The World (1902)
- Shakespeareana. Another Birthday Gift, April 23, 1906: A Challenge Frankly Phrased (1906)
- Shakespearean - On Shakespeare's Portraits (1907)
