= George Lee (cricketer, born 1854) =

English cricketer

George Henry Lee (24 August 1854 – 4 October 1919) was an English first-class cricketer, who played one match for Yorkshire County Cricket Club in 1879 in the Roses Match at Old Trafford. Opening the batting he was bowled by Allan Steel for 4, and in the second innings run out for 9, as Yorkshire suffered an innings defeat, with Steel taking eleven wickets in the match.

Lee was born in Almondbury, Huddersfield, Yorkshire, England, and died in October 1919 in Lockwood, Huddersfield, Yorkshire.

His brother, Herbert Lee, played five matches for Yorkshire.
