= Almondbury =

Village in West Yorkshire, England

Coordinates: 53.634361°N 1.7489001°W

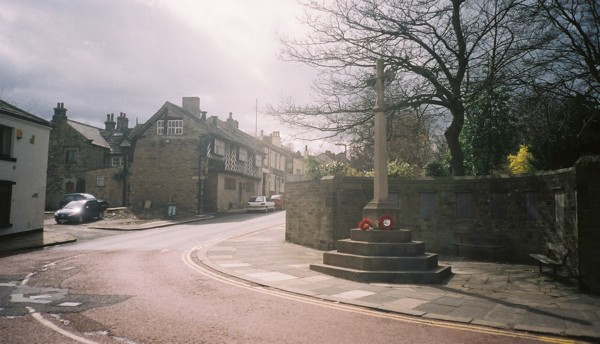
- Almondbury, showing Wormald's Hall (centre)

- Location within West Yorkshire
- Population: 18,346 (Ward. 2011)
- OS grid reference: SE 16701 15345
  - London: 160 mi (260 km) SE
- Metropolitan borough: Kirklees
- Metropolitan county: West Yorkshire
- Region: Yorkshire and the Humber
- Country: England
- Sovereign state: United Kingdom
- Post town: Huddersfield
- Postcode district: HD5 8
- Police: West Yorkshire
- Fire: West Yorkshire
- Ambulance: Yorkshire
- UK Parliament: Huddersfield

Almondbury (English: /ˈɑːməndbərɪ/) is a village 2 miles (3.2 km) south-east of Huddersfield town centre in the Kirklees district, of West Yorkshire, England. The population of Almondbury in 2001 was 7,368 increasing to 18,346 at the 2011 census.

The village is close to Castle Hill, Huddersfield's most prominent landmark. Almondbury has several notable buildings, including the 16th-century Wormald's Hall, now the village Conservative club, and the Grade I listed All Hallows Church. The church is mainly Perpendicular in style but the chancel is earlier. The roofs have a long inscription dated 1522 on the cornice. Other wooden furniture of interest includes a Georgian lectern, a pew of 1605 and a late Perpendicular font cover.

== History ==
The name Almondbury derives from the Old Norse almenn meaning 'the whole community' and the Old English 'burh' meaning fortification.

Almondbury appears in the Domesday Book as "Almondeberie". After the Norman Conquest, the land around the village was held by the powerful De Lacy family, who gave their name to De Lacy Avenue.

For 300 years until the 17th century, the village's Monday Market was the most important in the area. Almondbury was the hub of parish activity and in its early history was a more important centre than the town of Huddersfield. The villages of Linthwaite, Lockwood, Honley, Holmfirth and Meltham were all part of the Almondbury parish area.

In 1921 the civil parish had a population of 15,637. On 1 April 1924 the parish was abolished and merged with Huddersfield.

== Education ==
In 1547 the people of Almondbury were faced with the possible dissolution of its Chantry Chapel. By "concent of the parishe", Arthur Kay of Woodsome Hall and his son John "dyd shifte yt" stone by stone, along St Helen's Gate, to be reconstructed as a school house. A royal charter, formally called the Letters Patent, was granted by James I on 24 November 1608 and the school became a grammar school. The school has had various names (Almondbury Grammar School, King James's Grammar School) and today is called King James's School.

The Harry Taylor Trust was established in 1987 in memory of Harry Taylor, former headmaster of King James's Grammar School (1952-1973), to benefit pupils at the school and young people in the village of Almondbury.

There is also Hill View Academy on Fernside Avenue and Almond House Nursery on Forest Road. Almondbury Community School made headlines in November 2018 when a video clip was circulated on social media, showing white pupils bullying a Syrian refugee pupil, attempting waterboarding. The incident that had originally occurred in October was finally investigated by the school and police a month later.

In the 2020s, Almondbury became one of the locations the Channel 5 series The Yorkshire Vet was based at, with the animal hospital operated by Donaldson's Vets used alongside surgeries in Wetherby and Kirkbymoorside.

== Notable people ==
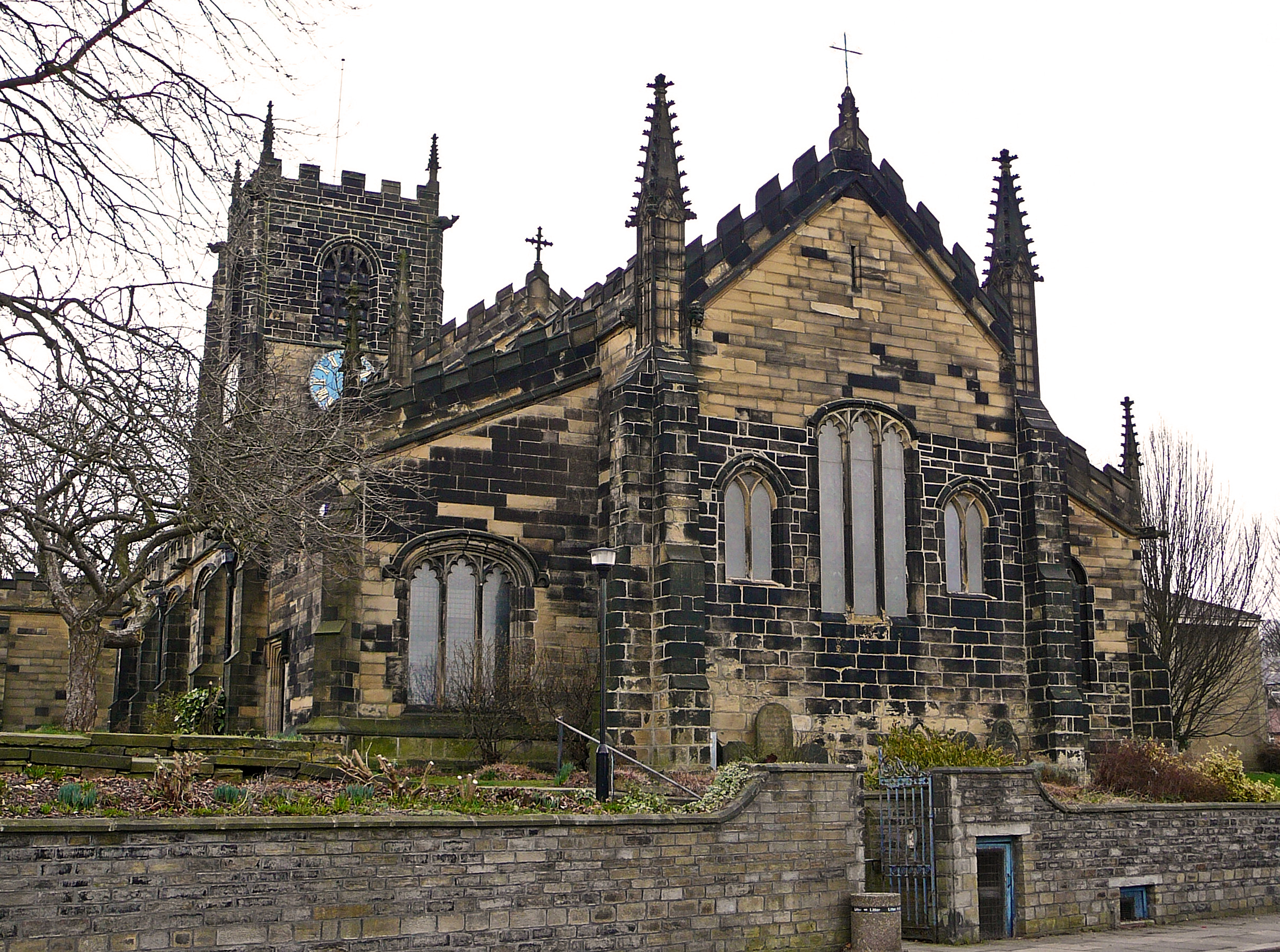
All Hallows Church

- Ronald Aspinall (1918–1999), cricketer
- Benjamin F. Cocker (1821–1883), professor of psychology, speculative philosophy and the philosophy of religion, University of Michigan (1869–1883); born in Almondbury
- Joanne Harris (born 1964), author
- Shakespeare Hirst (1841–1907), actor, author, and art collector
- George Lee (1854–1919), cricketer
- Carlton Oldfield (1871–1945), professor of obstetrics and gynaecology, University of Leeds (1919–1932); born in Almondbury
- Charles Augustus Hulbert (1804–1888), clergyman
- Sir David Radcliffe, (1834–1907) Mayor of Liverpool

== See also ==
- Listed buildings in Almondbury
