= Herbert Lee (cricketer) =

English cricketer

Herbert Lee (2 July 1856 – 4 February 1908) was an English first-class cricketer, who played five matches for Yorkshire County Cricket Club in 1885.

Born in Taylor Hill, Huddersfield, Yorkshire, England, Lee was a right-handed batsman, who scored 20 runs at 3.33, with a best score of 20 against Middlesex. He took 2 catches in the field, but did not bowl. He scored 141 for Yorkshire Colts against Nottinghamshire Colts in 1885.

He died in February 1908 in Lockwood, Huddersfield, Yorkshire.

His brother, George Lee, also played one match for Yorkshire.
