= Hill View Academy =

Location
- Fernside Avenue; Almondbury, West Yorkshire, HD5 8YE; England
- Coordinates: 53.63857°N 1.74516°W

Information
- Former name: Almondbury Community School
- Type: Academy
- Motto: Working Together to Achieve
- Local authority: Kirklees Council
- Trust: Impact Education Multi Academy Trust
- Department for Education URN: 148134 Tables
- Ofsted: Reports
- Head teacher: Kate Eastwood
- Gender: Mixed
- Age range: 3–11
- Capacity: 268
- Website: www.hillviewacademy.co.uk

Hill View Academy (formerly Almondbury Community School) is a 3–11 mixed primary school with academy status in Almondbury, West Yorkshire, England. It is part of the Impact Education Multi Academy Trust.

== History ==
In April 2014, the Kirklees Council Cabinet approved the merger of the Almondbury High School and Language College, the Almondbury Junior School, and Greenside Infant and Nursery School, "as an all-through school for children aged between 3 and 16 years". The three schools were combined following extensive consultation with parents and other community members.

Following a 2006 Ofsted report that rated the Almondbury High School and Language College as Grade 3 "Satisfactory" overall, the 2009 and 2012 reports gave a rating of Grade 2 "Good".

The reports of 2015 and 2017 rated the combined Almondbury Community School as Grade 3 "Requires Improvement" overall. A monitoring visit by Ofsted after the 2015 inspection noted "significant" positive changes in leadership, systems, teaching quality and governorship under a school improvement plan.

In 2018, Ofsted visited again concluding that sufficient progress had not been made. A list of issues was published and Kirklees was required to issue a recovery plan. A monitoring visit by Ofsted, confirmed the recovery plan was adequate.

Leaders and managers are taking effective action towards the removal of special measures. The local authority’s statement of action is fit for purpose. The school’s improvement plan is fit for purpose.

In 2018, Chair of the school Governors was Gill Goodswen, a former president of the National Union of Teachers (NUT).

The secondary department was closed in September 2020, while the primary school department converted to academy status and was renamed Hill View Academy. The school is now sponsored by the Impact Education Multi Academy Trust.

=== Almondbury controversy ===
On 25 October 2018, an assault took place on a 15-year-old student at Almondbury Community School; this was widely reported after a video recording of the assault was posted on social media.

Prime Minister Theresa May commented, "most people were sickened and angered" by the video clip; she went on to praise the public for the response, and for setting up a crowdfunding appeal for the youngster's family.
