= Return of refugees of the Syrian civil war =

Human toll of the Syrian civil war
- Pre-war population 22 ±.5; Internally displaced 6 ±.5, Refugees 5.5 ±.5, Fatalities 0.5 ±.1 (millions)

Syrian refugees
- By country: Turkey, Lebanon, Egypt, Jordan
- Settlements: Camps: Jordan

Internally displaced Syrians

Casualties of the war
- Crimes: War crimes, massacres, rape

Return of refugees of the Syrian civil war is the returning to the place of origin (Syria) of a Syrian refugee or an internally displaced Syrian, and sometimes a second-generation immigrant (to the ancestral place), or over-stayer, a rejected asylum seeker, who is unable or unwilling to remain in the Syrian refugee camps established in Turkey, Lebanon, Jordan, Egypt, and other countries.

== Foreign refugees ==
A result of Syrian Civil War is on the refugees who seek asylum in Syria from neighboring conflicts: Refugees of Iraq (1,300,000), Palestinian refugees (543,400), and Somalia (5,200).

April 2012, within Syria, there were 100,000 refugees from Iraq, 70,000 more already returned to Iraq.

Circassians in Syria have been returning to their historic homelands in Circassia. The Chechen and Ossetian diasporas in Syria have also sought to return to their Caucasus homelands.

On 29 October 2022, Australia repatriated four women and their 13 children stranded in refugee camps in northeastern Syria. Australian women and children have lived in the al-Hol and Roj detention camps in Kurdish-controlled north-eastern Syria after the ISIS terror group lost control of the area.

== Conditions against return ==
The UNHCR stated that conditions in Syria are still unsafe and destitute, improvements in many areas are uncertain and many basic services are absent; access of aid convoys is also a challenge. Less than a half of the returnees have access to water or health services, due to extremely damaged infrastructure. An estimated 10 per cent ended up as internally displaced persons once again.

=== Destruction ===
The incidences of damage, assessments are based on actual physical conditions, as seen on the satellite images from January 2017.

Syrian urban centers served as battlegrounds. The major populated cities Aleppo (important to the economy as the main place for industry and finance), Damascus, Homs and also many smaller towns faced with the low intensity conflict (on and off fighting lasted months), which caused the breakdown of partial or entire urban systems. Destruction lead to the collapse of economic activities in many areas as public service–related infrastructure (roads, schools, hospitals) is destroyed. Infrastructure such as bridges, water resources, grain silos, and other economically significant assets were used as a battle positions and consequently became strategic targets.

Destruction of homes. In 2011, Syria was rapidly urbanizing with 56% of the population living in urban areas (population density: 103 inhabitants/km2). Most urban areas are either in rain-fed agricultural regions, or in the basin of the Euphrates River. Remaining urban areas are along the interior trade routes. In 2006, 92% of the population had access to improved sanitation (96% urban and 88% rural) and 89% had access to improved water sources (95% urban and 83% rural). Damascus and Aleppo, the two largest cities, accounted for nearly 37% of the urban population and hold 20% of the total population. In 2010 Syrian census, 4,128,941 conventional dwelling units existed. In 2017, around 72.6% (from 56%) of the population (13.7 million people) was living in the urban areas. Homs and Aleppo were directly impacted (violence, destruction, and the collapse of basic services) and experienced an exodus. Other areas (promising relative security and consistency of services) had experienced large influxes. The net result was a significant concentration of the population (internally displaced persons and their hosts) in urban areas. In 2017, at the city level (city boundaries, no suburbs, no towns, etc) conflict had an impact (bombed, shelled, gunned etc) in an estimated total of 316,649 housing units. Aleppo at the top of list with 64% impact, followed by Homs at 16%. Across the 10 most populated cities, 27% of the housing had impact (7% destroyed and 20% partially damaged). Across Syria (that is eight governorates that had active conflict) statistics translates into an estimated 220,826 residential units destroyed and 649,449 partially damaged.

Destruction in health care. Before the conflict, physical infrastructure capacity in Syrian health care was below the averages of regional countries. Syrian health care showed regional variance within Syria (better at one place, but not others). Hospitals became specifically targeted places of attacks. Physicians for Human Rights documented attacks on 400 facilities (some multiple times) and the deaths of 768 health personnel between March 2011 and the end of July 2016. United Nations Security Council Resolution 2286 (3 May 2016) condemned the attacks on medical facilities and personnel. United Nations Security Council Resolution 2268 (26 February 2016) asked to grand health support (access to humanitarian workers). As of 2016, 14 hospitals and 57 medical centers in Aleppo corresponding to 35% destruction on pre-conflict structures. As of February 2017, almost 9 in 10 health facilities in Raqqa (partially damage 80%) and Dayz az-Zawr (partially damage 79%) suffered some form of damage. As of February 2017, across Syria (that is eight governorates that had active conflict) 68% of all medical centers, 84% of specialized medical centers, 75% of medical points, and 51% of all polyclinics experienced some form of physical damage. According to Physicians for Human Rights, at least 15,000 of Syria’s 30,000 physicians have left their positions. As of 2014, Aleppo had fewer than 70 where 6,000 physicians were in the city at pre-war. More people may have been killed (women who died in labor because she required a C-section, or the men who had a heart attack and died because lack of a medication, or elderly person who died as a result of complications from diabetes that was not managed) in Syria than KIA due to a breakdown of the health system.

Destruction in educational structures. In 2009, Education in Syria had primary net enrollment rate (NER) of 93% and the enrollment gender gap was negligible. In the 2007 Trends in International Mathematics and Science Study, Syria ranked 32 and 39 of 49 countries for eighth grade science and mathematics, respectively. Education facilities became military bases, schools used as military quarters and informal shelters for displaced people. Vocational institutes (14.5%), secondary schools (14.7%), and education offices (33.3%) were the highest targeted educational structures. Aleppo (fully destroyed 49), Da’ra (fully destroyed 21), Raqqa (fully destroyed 7) and Tadmur (fully destroyed 7) had destroyed educational facilities. Kobani, Homs, Douma, and Daya Az-Zawr had 5 or fewer facilities fully destroyed.

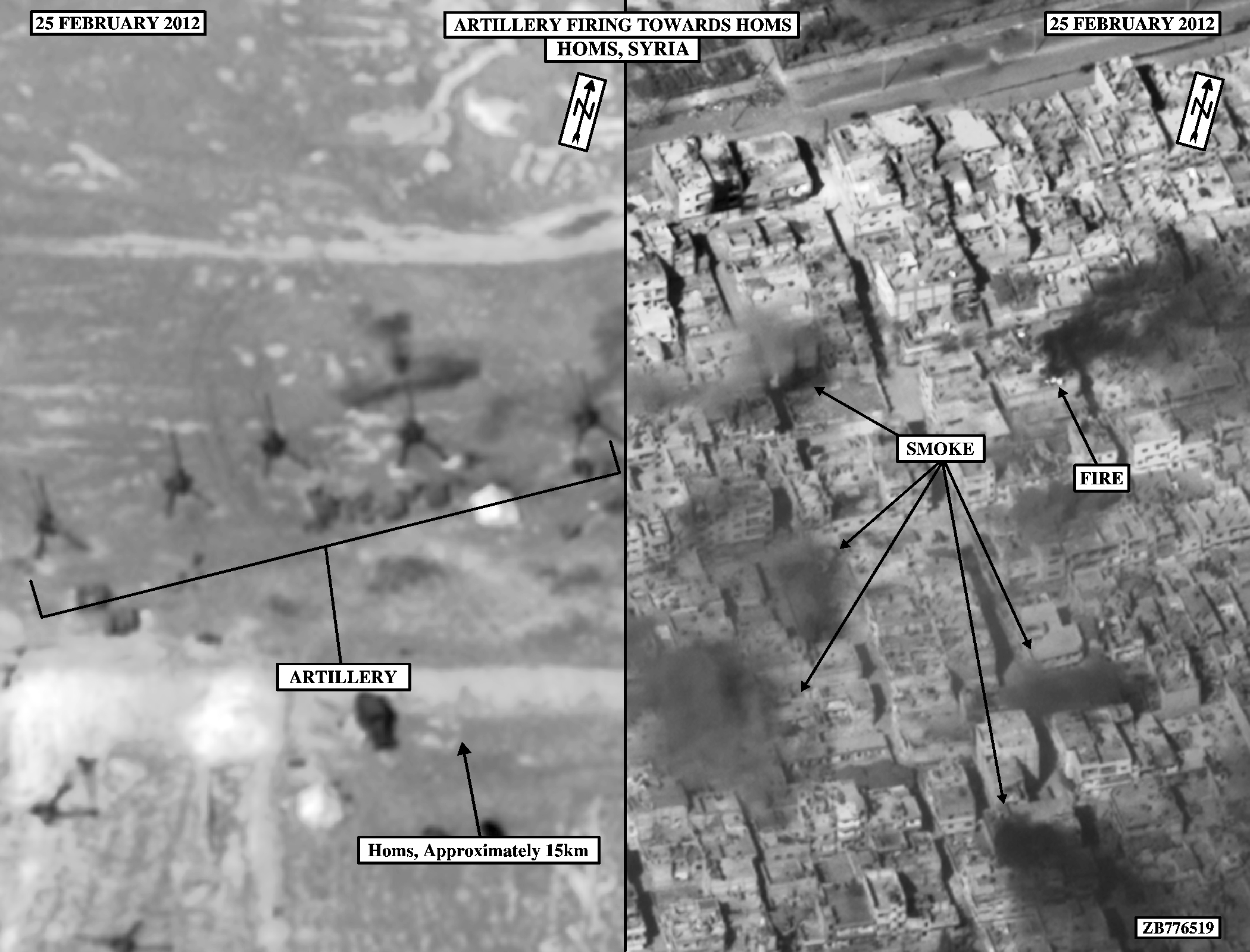
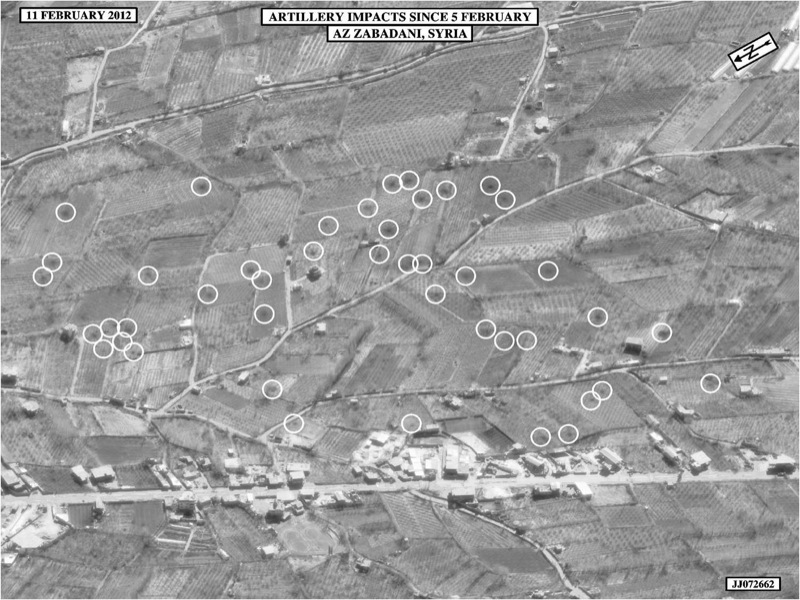
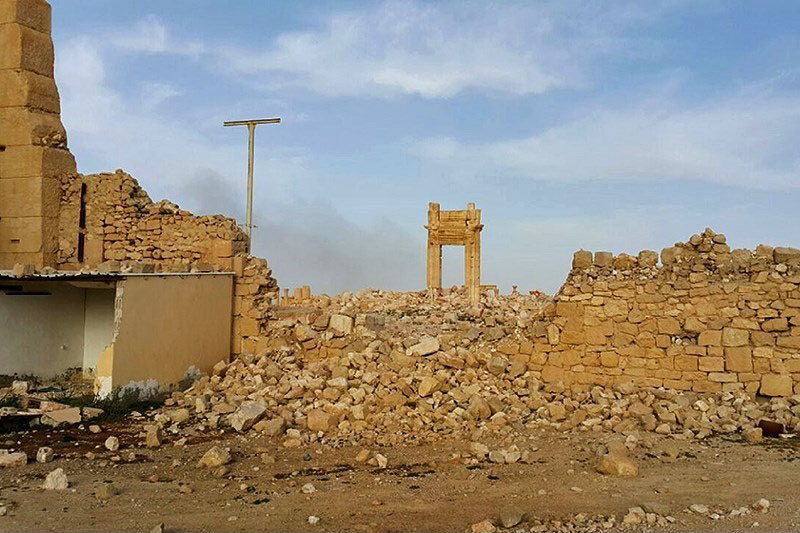
From Top left to right: housing units, Siege of Homs, health sector, Al-Zabadani, education facilities, Palmyra.

The conflict caused damage to numerous historic buildings, tell mounds and archaeological locations, including all six UNESCO World Heritage Sites in the country. List of heritage sites damaged during the Syrian Civil War. Deliberate destruction and theft of cultural heritage has been conducted by the Islamic State of Iraq and the Levant since 2014.

=== Syrian law 10 ===
The Syrian government has put forward a law commonly known as "law 10", which could strip refugees of property, such as damaged real estate. There are also fears among some refugees that if they return to claim this property they will face negative consequences, such as forced conscription or prison. The Syrian government has been criticized for using this law to reward those who have supported the government. However, the government denies this and has expressed that it wants the return of refugees from Lebanon. In December 2018, it was also reported that the Syrian government has started to seize property under an anti-terrorism law, which is affecting government opponents negatively, with many losing their property. Some people's pensions have also been cancelled.

=== The war economy ===
Ongoing conflict for many years, stop the functioning of the formal economy, capital moved out, and state weakening in much of Syria have predictably given rise to war economy. Syrian economy characterized by black market activity, looting, smuggling, seizure of assets, extortion, and exploitation of people.

The current economy in Syria under armed groups which implicated in looting, smuggling, seizure of assets, extortion activities and often control strategic assets such as oil and crops.

=== Declining economy ===
The destruction of physical capital, casualties, forced migration, and breaking up of economic networks was catastrophic for Syria’s economic activity, Economy of Syria is in decline -10% (2014 est).

Structure of the Working-Age Population in Syria, 2010
- 1. Working age population 13 million 63%
  - 2. Inactive 7.2 million 55.4%
  - 3. Active 5.8 million 44.6%
    - 6. Employed 5.3 million 91.4%
      - 8. Wage-employed 3.3 million 63.2%
        - 14. Private sector 1.9 million 57%
        - 15. Public sector 1.4 million 43%
      - 9. Self-employed 1.5 million 28.8%
      - 10. Employer 0.2 million 4.2%
      - 11. Unpaid worker 0.2 million 3.8%
    - 7. Unemployed 0.5 million 8.6%
      - 12. Men 0.3 million 61%
      - 13. Women 0.2 million 39%

As of 2017, 6 in 10 Syrians live in extreme poverty. The poverty rate in 2016 is 66.5 percent (estimated). As of 2017, the "United Nations Office for the Coordination of Humanitarian Affairs" claim 9 million in need of food assistance in Syria.

Structure of the Working-Age Population in Syria, 2015, 4 years into conflict
- 1. Working age population 11.6 million 62.9%
  - 2. Inactive 6.1 million 52.8%
  - 3. Active 5.5 million 47.2%
    - 5. Employed 2.6 million 47.1%
      - 6. Agriculture 0.4 million 16%
      - 7. Industry 0.02 million 1%
      - 8. Building & Construction 0.4 million 16%
      - 9. Trade & Tourism 0.5 million 19%
      - 10. Transportation & Communications 0.2 million 7%
      - 11. Other services 1.1 million 41%
    - 4. Unemployed 2.9 million 52.9%

Imposing sanctions on Syria affected the economy. The import restrictions are promulgated, consumers have restricted choices of goods. Export restrictions imposed which caused decline in markets and investment opportunities. Since the outbreak of the Syrian civil war, the Syrian economy has been hit by massive economic sanctions restricting trade with the Arab League, Australia, Canada, the European Union, (as well as the European countries of Albania, Iceland, Liechtenstein, Moldova, Montenegro, North Macedonia, Norway, Serbia, and Switzerland) Georgia, Japan, South Korea, Taiwan, Turkey, and the United States. West already took steps to block any activity in Syria, there are further steps. In January 2019, the EU added 11 people and five entities to its sanctions list. The U.S. Congress planning a rigorous Syria sanctions bill.

== Conditions for return ==
The Syrian foreign minister called on the country's refugees to return home. Mr President Assad has asked refugees to return, and he claimed host countries abusing foreign aid.

=== Stability/security ===
The attempts to find/bring stability began in late 2011. As of 2019, Syrian peace process and De-escalation are ongoing efforts.

==== Peace process ====
The Arab League launched two initiatives, but without much success. The Syrian peace process is the ensemble of initiatives and plans to resolve the Syrian Civil War and spills beyond its borders. The United Nations Security Council Resolution 2254 was unanimously adopted on 18 December 2015, which calls for a ceasefire and political settlement in Syria.

Financial Times reported that returning Syrian men either risk death in the military or risk the prison network. Human rights groups have documented widespread torture and abuse of detainees part of Human rights violations during the Syrian Civil War.

==== De-escalation ====
As of 2019, there were Safe Zones, along with their ceasefire areas, established in Syria in order to halt fighting. These agreements were set to expire in every 6 months with possibility of continued renewal.

=== Reconstruction ===
2016, World Bank estimated the reconstruction at $226 billion. 2019, the United Nations estimated the reconstruction at $250 billion.

While the war still ongoing, Syrian President Bashar al-Assad claimed that Syria will be able to rebuild the war-torn country on its own. As of July 2018, the reconstruction is estimated to cost a minimum of US$400 billion. Assad claims to be able to loan this money from friendly countries, Syrian diaspora and the state treasury. In 2019 Atlantic quoted a diplomat: “I’m told that before the war, the capital budget was $60 billion, and last year the capital budget was $300 million, of which only 20 percent was actually spent. Not only does it not have the money, but they don’t have administrative [or] political capacity to build the country.”

Iran – Iran has expressed interest in helping rebuild Syria. International donors have been suggested as one financier of the reconstruction. As of November 2018, reports emerged that rebuilding efforts had already started. It was reported that the biggest issue facing the rebuilding process is the lack of building material and a need to make sure the resources that do exist are managed efficiently. The rebuilding effort have so far remained at a limited capacity and has often been focused on certain areas of a city, thus ignoring other areas inhabited by disadvantaged people.

Russia – In 2019, Russian Foreign Minister Sergey Lavrov stated his country's contributions to Syrian reconstruction were helping to improve the humanitarian crisis. Moscow investment in the Syrian energy sector accompanied other footholds in other sectors such advance deals for power generation projects in Homs, a rail line linking Damascus International Airport to the city center, and an array of industrial plants that will play an instrumental role in Syria’s future development.

France – There would be “no reconstruction without [a] political transition,” a French embassy spokeswoman recently told to Atlantic. Referenced to United Nations Security Council Resolution 2254, which calls for “credible, inclusive and nonsectarian governance … free and fair elections … to the highest international standards of transparency and accountability...”

United States NGO – In 2019, International donors pledged $7 billion, including $397 million from the United States, for the civilians. The Atlantic Council’s published "Rebuilding Syria" program, which was developed requesting information from officials of the US government and some other specialists, including development experts, their own policy analysts, and some partner governments which is not in conflict with US.

Stated conclusions as summarized by the source: 1 Announcing an official US goal and policy of stabilizing non-regime areas of Syria and building an international coalition of financial and development partners in this effort. 2 Allocating resources and personnel tasked with ground up stabilization and reconstruction in parts of Syria outside regime control. 3 Clearly communicating which areas of Syria will be affected by this commitment, securing necessary de-escalation agreements with the regime or its backers, and backing those agreements with the credible threat of lethal force against violators. 4 Announcing unequivocal US opposition to any international efforts to rebuild Syria through regime-controlled institutions in the absence of a meaningful political compromise by the regime. 5 Engaging with local stakeholders in aid, development, commerce, construction, services, and other vital sectors to assess needs and identify legitimate partners. 6 Determining the prerequisites of return for displaced persons and engaging with them and locals around depopulated areas in non-regime territory.

— Atlantic Council

== Countries declared safe return ==
Denmark – Denmark has reclassified Damascus as safe.

== Voluntary return movements of refugees ==
As of 2012, more than 5,000 returned to Syria between July and August, while most were moved to newly built camps that hosted 7,600 refugees by November.

As of mid-2017, an estimated 260,000 refugees returned to Syria since 2015 and more than 440,000 internally displaced persons returned to their homes, to search for family, check on property and, in some cases, due to improved security in parts of the country.

Following the fall of the Assad regime in December 2024, thousands of Syrian refugees crossed the border returning from Lebanon within a few hours. By June 2025, more than two million Syrians returned to their homes, according to Filippo Grandi, the United Nations Commissioner for Refugees. In September 2025, the United Nations announced that about one million Syrian refugees from abroad have returned to the country since December 2024.

=== Denmark ===
In the first three quarters of 2025, 523 Syrians returned to Syria voluntarily. For 2025, a total of 665 Syrians returned to Syria voluntarily.

=== Germany ===
On 13 August 2025, the Interior Ministry of Germany announced that 1,337 Syrians in Germany returned to Syria through voluntary official programs from December 2024 to July 2025.

=== Jordan ===
Since the fall of the Assad regime, more than 75,000 refugees returned from Jordan. In May 2025, more than 15,000 refugees who were registered with UNHCR returned to Syria from Jordan, which was a 45 percent increase compared to April, when about 10,500 refugees returned.

=== Lebanon ===
Lebanon hosts 929,624 as of 2019. Since 2011, Lebanon has taken Syrian refugees. Lebanon has seen 2.2 million estimated arrivals as of December 2015.

In 2015, Lebanon stopped the Office of the United Nations High Commissioner for Refugees from registering Syrians.

In May 2019, 301 refugees were summarily deported as an official decision to send back refugees entered after April 24. The Lebanese refugee policy is driven by a slowing economy and high unemployment. In May 2025, around 150 Syrian families returned from Lebanon. In October 2025, the Minister of Social Affairs, Hanin Sayyed, announced that more than 320,000 Syrians have returned to Syria and another 110,000 more are schedule to return by the end of the year. From January to April 2026, more than 120,000 Syrian refugees returned to Syria.

=== Libya ===
In October 2025, the International Organization for Migration reported that 152 Syrians voluntarily returned to Syria from Libya.

=== Netherlands ===
In September 2025, 84 Syrians returned to Syria from the Netherlands. By the end of 2025, nearly 950 Syrians returned to Syria.

=== Turkey ===
Turkey framed its generosity in bestowing money or gifts toward Syrians fleeing the civil war as a moral duty (Islamic duty).

In August 2019, Turkey began imposing restrictions on where in Turkey Syrians could live.

By April 2025, more than 175,000 Syrians refugees returned to the country, according to Turkish Interior Minister Ali Yerlikaya. This increased the number of Syrians returned from Turkey since 2017 to 915,515. In September 2025, Yerlikaya stated that since December 2024, around 474,018 Syrian refugees returned to the country, increasing the number of Syrians returned to Syria since 2016 to 1,213,620 people.

== See also ==
- Syrian civil war
- Refugees of the Syrian civil war

== Bibliography ==
- Staff, World Bank (2017). THE TOLL OF WAR: THE ECONOMIC AND SOCIAL CONSEQUENCES OF THE CONFLICT IN SYRIA (PDF) (Report). New York: World Bank Group. Source is available (listed at page 3) under a Creative Commons Attribution 3.0 IGO license.
