= Safe Zone (Syria) =

Syria war 2011

Human toll of the Syrian civil war
- Pre-war population 22 ±.5; Internally displaced 6 ±.5, Refugees 5.5 ±.5, Fatalities 0.5 ±.1 (millions)

Syrian refugees
- By country: Turkey, Lebanon, Egypt, Jordan
- Settlements: Camps: Jordan

Internally displaced Syrians

Casualties of the war
- Crimes: War crimes, massacres, rape

Safe zones, de-escalation zones or no-fly zones have been proposed or created at various points during the Syrian civil war which began in 2011, including "de-escalation zones" agreed between the Turkish and Russian powers backing various belligerent parties and no-fly zones proposed in the Kurdish Northeast and rebel Northwest of the country.

== Turkey's proposed safe zone ==
Turkey and the Syrian opposition proposed a safe zone that includes some regions of northern Syria; however, the United States and the other Western states were not willing to accept these plans. After the advancements of ISIL in Iraq, Turkey and the United States negotiated a "safe zone", while the US accepted "ISIL-free zone", US officials were reluctant to accept a no fly zone.

In 2016 the Prime Minister of the United Kingdom, Theresa May, stated "The scenes we see of the indiscriminate slaughter of innocent civilians are absolutely appalling. We want to see an end to that, but there are many questions about a no-fly zone that need to be looked at: Who is it there to protect? Would it lead to [President Bashar al-]Assad bombing people in the expectation that they would then move to that zone? Who would enforce that safe area?"

Damascus rejected Turkey's proposed safe zone and also blamed the Syrian Kurds. Stating "Syria’s Kurds who have accepted to become a tool in this aggressive US-Turkish project bear a historical responsibility."

== Kurdish proposed no-fly zone ==
In April 2017 Îlham Ehmed, the current co-president of the Executive Council of the Autonomous Administration of North and East Syria (AANES), stated "The US must take a clear stand against Turkish aggression. We demand that the US establish a no-fly zone to protect us against further aggression" With the Kurdish People's Protection Units (YPG) also calling for a no-fly zone via Twitter stating "Only [by] declaring north Syria as a no-fly zone can YPG defend the country unhindered. Turkey must adhere to no-fly zone", among protesters which gathered in Qamishli and online.

In 2018 James Jeffrey, the United States Special Representative for Syria Engagement raised the possibility of a no-fly zone for the Syrian Kurds in Rojava, what is now the Autonomous Administration of North and East Syria (AANES), stating "Remember, we were present not in northern Iraq, but over northern Iraq in Operation Northern Watch for 13 years", also suggesting that it did not need to be US forces, but "That can be a UN force. Under [resolution] 2254, there is language on a UN-managed and operated ceasefire. That can be partner forces. That can be other countries' forces."

On October 10, 2019, Sinam Mohamad, the co-chair of the Syrian Democratic Council, the political arm of the Syrian Democratic Forces, again called for a no-fly zone in an effort to stop the attacks, she stated "We ask a for no-fly zone over our area. At least we will not have civilian casualties then"

On October 31, 2019 Îlham Ehmed argued that instead of joint patrols again called for a no-fly zone and an international force in order to monitor security on the border with Turkey.

== 2017 de-escalation zones ==
Four ceasefire areas or de-escalation zones were proposed in 2017 in order to halt the intense fighting between the various sides involved in the Syrian civil war. The framework for the de-escalation zones were agreed on as a result of the Astana talks between Russia, Iran and Turkey, in May 2017 while the final demarcation of the areas was completed in June 2017. The de-escalation zones agreement was set to expire in six months, with the possibility of continued renewal.

== Idlib demilitarization (2018–2019) ==
The de-escalation zones were set up in the greater Idlib region (including parts of Latakia and Aleppo under armed rebel control), the Rastan pocket in the Homs governorate, eastern Ghouta, including the Damascus countryside, and southern Syria (parts of Daraa and Quinetra governorates under insurgent control). The de-escalation zones notably excluded the American-controlled at-Tanf pocket, the areas controlled by the Syrian Democratic Forces in north and eastern Syria and the Turkish-controlled zones in the north.

The de-escalation zones are demarcated by the presence of Turkish, Iranian and Russian observation posts on the opposing sides the line separating governments forces from armed rebel forces. It was reported that Russian military police would work with Turkish military forces in the de-escalation zones and not let any Syrian Arab Army formations enter these areas in order to avoid any incitement which could turn into escalation.

As of January 1, 2019, the de-escalation zones in southern Syria, Damascus and Homs have been abolished after offensives conducted by the Syrian Arab Army on three occasions, which resulted in most of the armed rebels reconciling with the government and a sizeable minority taking the government-sanctioned busses to the greater Idlib region.

== Northern Syria Buffer Zone (August 2019) ==
The Northern Syria Buffer Zone (aka "Safe Zone", "Peace Corridor", "Security Mechanism") was a temporary Syrian Civil War demilitarized zone (DMZ) established on the Syrian side of the Syria–Turkey border in August 2019 to maintain security along the border and to dissuade a prospective Turkish invasion of the self-proclaimed Autonomous Administration of North and East Syria. The DMZ was administered by the Kurdish-led Syrian Democratic Forces (SDF) and their military councils and enforced by United States Armed Forces and Turkish Armed Forces personnel.

== Second Northern Syria Buffer Zone (October 2019) ==
The Second Northern Syria Buffer Zone, part of the Sochi Agreement (Turkish: Soçi Mutabakatı, Russian: Сочинское соглашение), is a buffer zone in northern Syria between the Turkish Armed Forces (TAF) and the Syrian Democratic Forces (SDF). It was set up following a memorandum of understanding in the Russian city of Sochi on October 22, 2019, by the Russian and Turkish presidents during the 2019 Turkish offensive into north-eastern Syria. Most of the zone is controlled by the Syrian Army and Russian Military Police, and some by the TAF.

== See also ==
- Adana Agreement
- Humanitarian corridor
- Iraqi no-fly zones conflict
- Korean Demilitarized Zone
- No man's land
- Operation Deny Flight (Bosnia)
- Seam zone (Israel/Palestine)
- United Nations Buffer Zone in Cyprus
- United Nations Security Council Resolution 1973 (No-Fly Zone in 2011 Libyan Civil War)
- Vietnamese Demilitarized Zone
