= Syrian refugee camps =

Camps for refugees of the Syrian Civil War

Human toll of the Syrian civil war
- Pre-war population 22 ±.5; Internally displaced 6 ±.5, Refugees 5.5 ±.5, Fatalities 0.5 ±.1 (millions)

Syrian refugees
- By country: Turkey, Lebanon, Egypt, Jordan
- Settlements: Camps: Jordan

Internally displaced Syrians

Casualties of the war
- Crimes: War crimes, massacres, rape

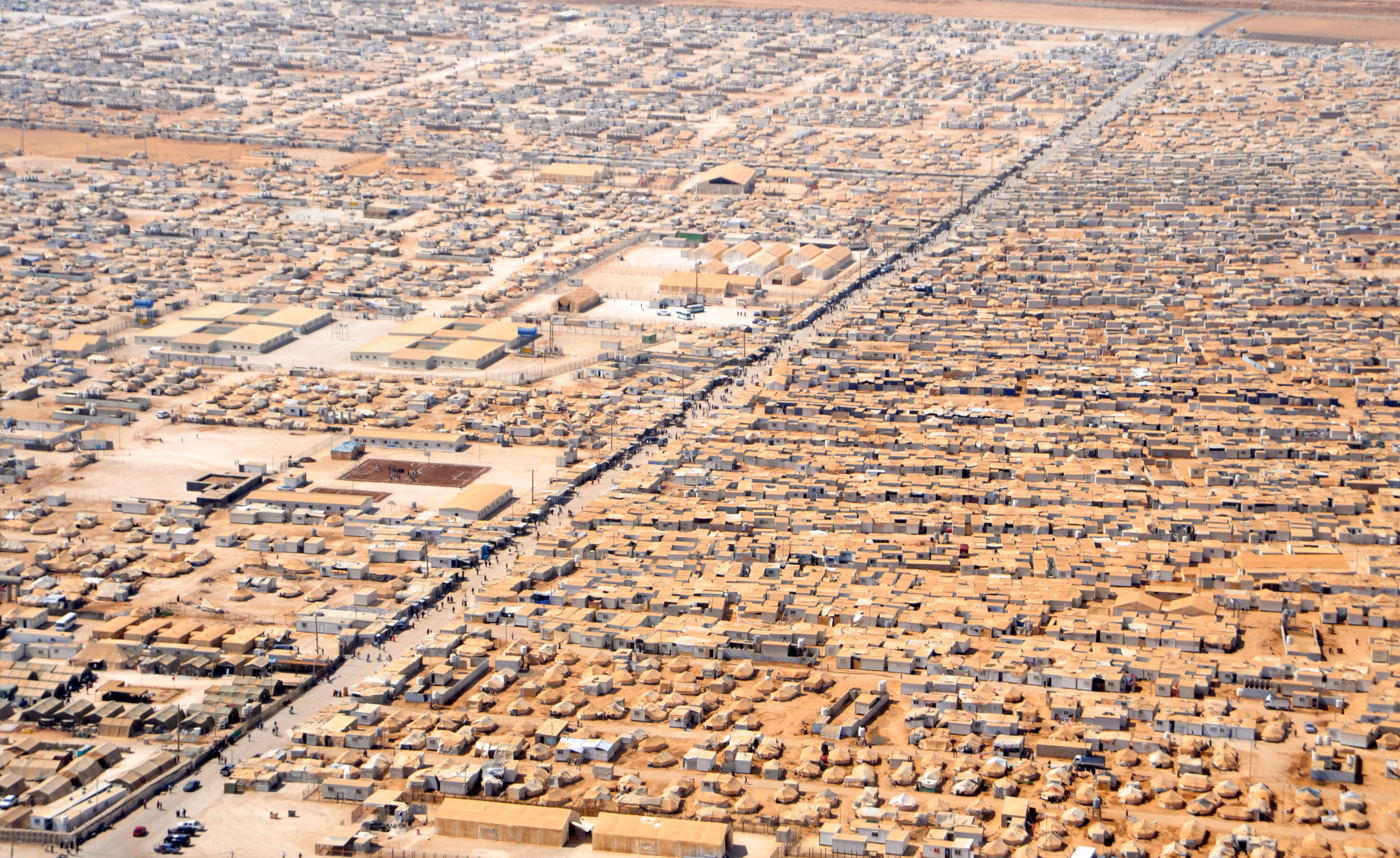
Zaatari in Jordan, currently the largest camp for Syrian refugees.

Syrian refugee camp and shelters are temporary settlements built to receive internally displaced people and refugees of the Syrian Civil War. Of the estimated 7 million persons displaced within Syria, only a small minority live in camps or collective shelters. Similarly, of the 8 million refugees, only about 10 percent live in refugee camps, with the vast majority living in both urban and rural areas of neighboring countries. Beside Syrians, they include Iraqis, Palestinians, Kurds, Yazidis, individuals from Somalia, and a minority of those who fled the Yemeni and Sudanese civil wars.

There were 2 million school-aged refugee children (aged 5–17 years) among the 5 million refugees registered in Turkey, Lebanon, Jordan, Iraq and Egypt by the end of 2016. 1.1 million of those children have had access to either formal education (900,000) or non-formal education (150,000), including over 6,600 Palestine refugee children from Syria. Humanitarian aid during the Syrian Civil War focuses on basic needs, health care, education and providing jobs. Most of the burden remains on the host countries, which face a stressed economy and export disruption, with the additional population, mostly outside of camps, causing significant pressure on public and private (e.g. housing) infrastructure.

== Shelters in Syria ==
Within Syria itself, shelter aid for internally displaced persons is coordinated mainly by the Global Shelter Cluster (co-led by UNHCR, IFRC and the Syrian Ministry of Local Administration). However, there is poor accessibility to the areas of need, so efforts were directed at emergency aid. The Shelter Cluster also cites the complexity of administrative procedures and limited capacity of NGOs permitted to operate in Syria as challenges to assistance.

In 2016, public buildings were rehabilitated as collective short and mid-term shelters for 24,000 persons. For example, of the 90,000 people from east Aleppo registered by the UN, the vast majority live in houses. The remaining 4,250 individuals live in the Jibrin collective shelter, as of January 2017. Shelter and winterization kits (light construction materials and tools and clothes, blankets, etc.) were distributed to 26,000 people, while 40,000 benefited from private building upgrades. Only recently the situation allowed for implementing more durable solutions that included full, long-term rehabilitation of damaged houses. It also improved basic living conditions, such as light infrastructure repair and legal help.

=== Palestinian refugee camps ===
UNRWA estimates that 450,000 Palestinian refugees remain in Syria, of whom up to 280,000 are internally displaced, and an estimated 43,000 are trapped in hard-to-reach locations. Some have been displaced multiple times as a result of armed violence. Additionally, 120,000 are displaced to neighboring countries. Until 2011, UNRWA provided services in 12 camps administered by Syrian authorities, including Homs and Yarmouk. Many sustained extensive damage and were forcibly displaced due to armed conflict. As of January 2017, UNRWA manages 9 shelters with about 2,600 Palestine refugees and provides cash, food and non-food items to many more. Battles between Tahrir al-Sham and ISIL for control of the Yarmouk Camp continue for more than two years, as of April 2017.

== Host countries in the Regional Refugee and Resilience Plan ==
The Regional Refugee and Resilience Plan (3RP) gives a strategic overview, plans and reports, developed by UNHCR, UNDP and NGOs together with governments of Egypt and countries neighboring Syria which includes Turkey, Jordan, Lebanon, and Iraq. The Israeli government has refused to offer any resettlement places to refugees.

=== Turkey ===
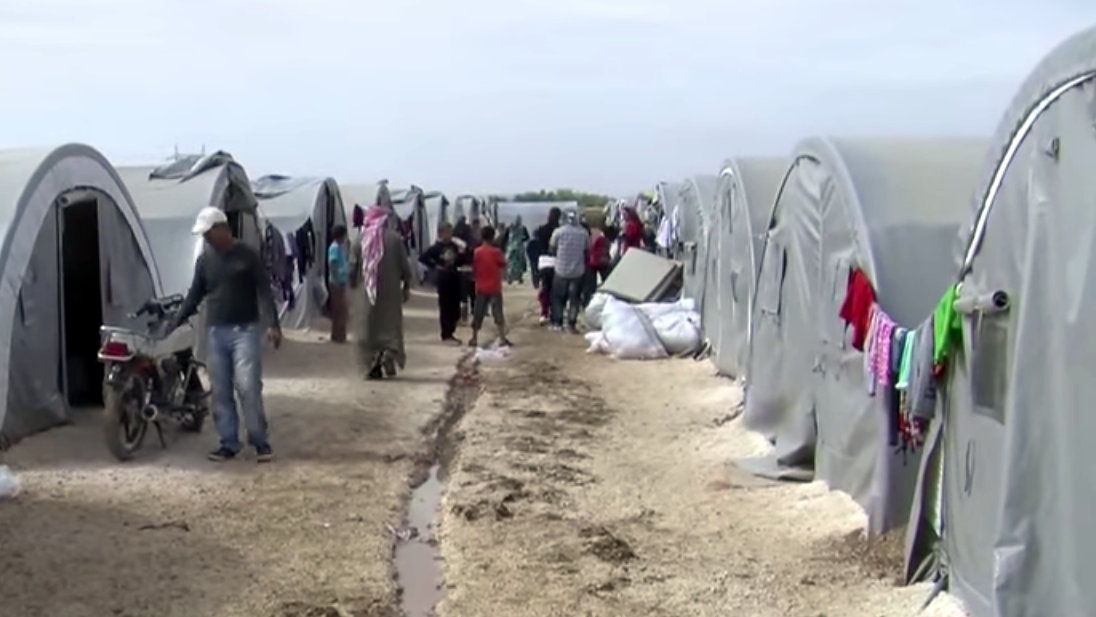
A camp near the Syrian border at Suruç, Turkey.

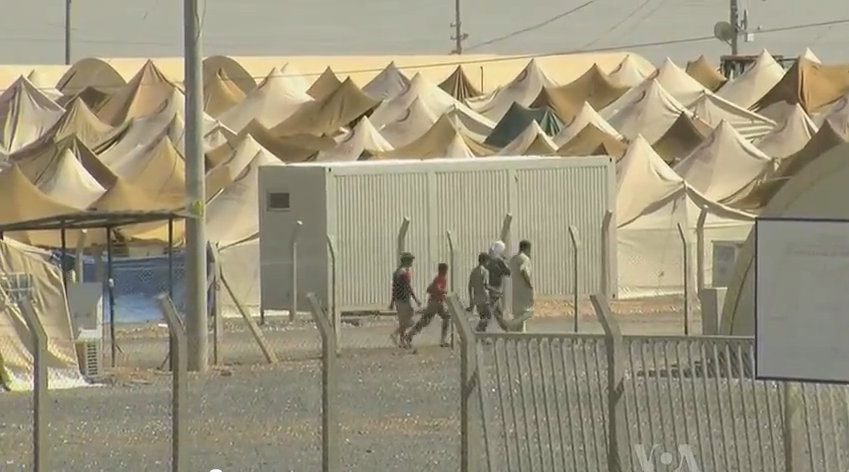
The Ceylanpınar tent camp.

In Turkey, the population of Syrian refugees is estimated to be around 3.0 million, with many more who are unregistered, of whom 260,000 live in the 22 camps, as of May 2017. The camps, also known as Temporary Accommodation Centers or Temporary Protection Centers (TPCs), are run by the government-led Disaster and Emergency Management Presidency (AFAD) with the support of the United Nations and NGO partners.

Province	Camp name	Population	Total
Hatay	Altınözü (1 and 2) container camp	8,062	19,790
Hatay	Yayladağı (1 and 2) container camp	3,746	19,790
Hatay	Apaydın container camp	5,229	19,790
Hatay	Güveççi tent camp	2,753	19,790
Şanlıurfa	Ceylanpınar tent camp	21,176	113,172
Şanlıurfa	Akçakale tent camp	31,598	113,172
Şanlıurfa	Harran container camp	13,761	113,172
Şanlıurfa	Viranşehir tent camp	15,157	113,172
Şanlıurfa	Suruç tent camp	31,480	113,172
Gaziantep	Islahiye 1 tent camp	7,372	38,543
Gaziantep	Islahiye 2 tent camp	10,061	38,543
Gaziantep	Karkamış tent camp	6,605	38,543
Gaziantep	Nizip 1 tent camp	10,033	38,543
Gaziantep	Nizip 2 container camp	4,472	38,543
Kilis	Öncüpınar container city	15,735	36,076
Kilis	Elbeyli Besiriye container camp	20,341	36,076
Kahramanmaraş	Merkez container camp	18,214	18,214
Osmaniye	Cevdetiye tent camp	7,304	7,304
Adıyaman	Merkez tent camp	9,625	9,625
Adana	Sarıçam tent camp	555	555
Mardin	Midyat tent camp	3,373	3,373
Malatya	Beydağı container camp	10,227	10,227

A camp with a 20,000-person capacity in the Derik district of Mardin was inaugurated in February 2015; however in 2016, it was emptied due to security concerns. 6,500 refugees were then transferred to other camps. A tent camp was also present in Nusaybin, Mardin, but it was forcibly evacuated and turned into a military headquarters by the Turkish military, according to Kurdish reports; the town has since seen clashes with the PKK. A Turkish NGO reported several Yezidi camps and settlements in southeastern Turkey, including more than 6,000 persons, with UNHCR or other UN agencies not present in the area. They are coordinated by understaffed local Kurdish political structures with scarce resources.

=== Jordan ===
Location of Syrian refugee camps in Jordan.

The Jordanian Response Plan 2017-2019 outlines the official approach to the refugee crisis. There were 660,000 refugees in Jordan registered with UNHCR as of May 2017, constituting about 9% of its population. This number included 140,000 people in the three camps managed by UNHCR and the Jordanian government. In an interview with BBC in January 2017, Jordanian Chief of Staff Lieutenant, Mahmoud Freihat, claimed that there are 1 million more unregistered refugees in Jordan. A November 2016 national census showed that there were 1.3 million Syrians residing in the country.

The Zaatari camp opened in July 2012 and by 2013 was hosted above 100,000 refugees. The Mrajeeb Al Fhood (April 2013) and Azraq (April 2014) camps were then built to bring Zaatari back to its capacity of 80,000. Zaatari and Azraq are now the two largest Syrian refugee camps. UNHCR reported in January 2017 that only 35,000 of the 54,000 people registered in the Azraq camp were actually present there.

At the eastern part of the border with Syria, an area known as "the berm", informal encampments have been reported in Rukban and Hadallat. Human Rights Watch and Amnesty International criticized Jordanian authorities for suspending aid to them and not allowing refugees in. In 2016, according to FSA rebels, Russian warplanes bombed the Hadallat camp, killing at least 12 people. At dawn on 21 June 2016, an ISIL car crossed over from Rukban on Syrian territory and managed to reach a Jordanian army outpost designated for the distribution of humanitarian aid to refugees. The car exploded, killing 6 and injuring 14 Jordanian soldiers. The incident led Jordan to seal off its borders with Syria, as several other incidents followed that targeted refugees on the Syrian side of Rukban. According to government officials in January 2017, ISIL controlled the encampment, so access was blocked because of security concerns over hidden ISIL sleeper cells.

Severe water scarcity in Jordan has been aggravated by the increased population. The refugees in Zaatari and Azraq camps must manage with 35 liters of water a day per person, which is about 3 times less than before the conflict.

Camp name	Population
Zaatari refugee camp	80,000
Azraq refugee camp	36,000
Mrajeeb Al Fhood refugee camp (Emirati Jordanian Camp, EJC)	?4,000

=== Lebanon ===
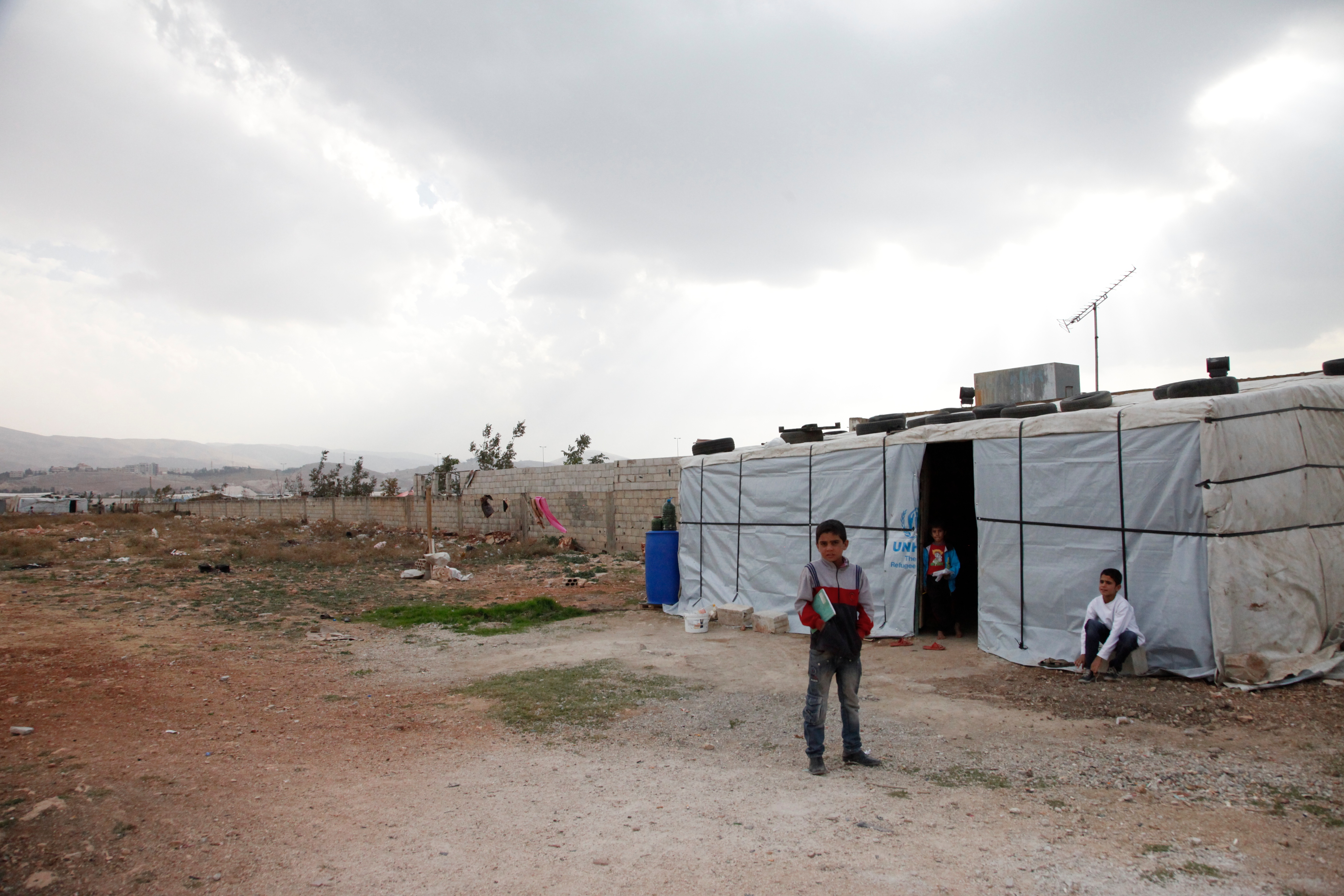
A winter tent in Lebanon's Bekaa Valley

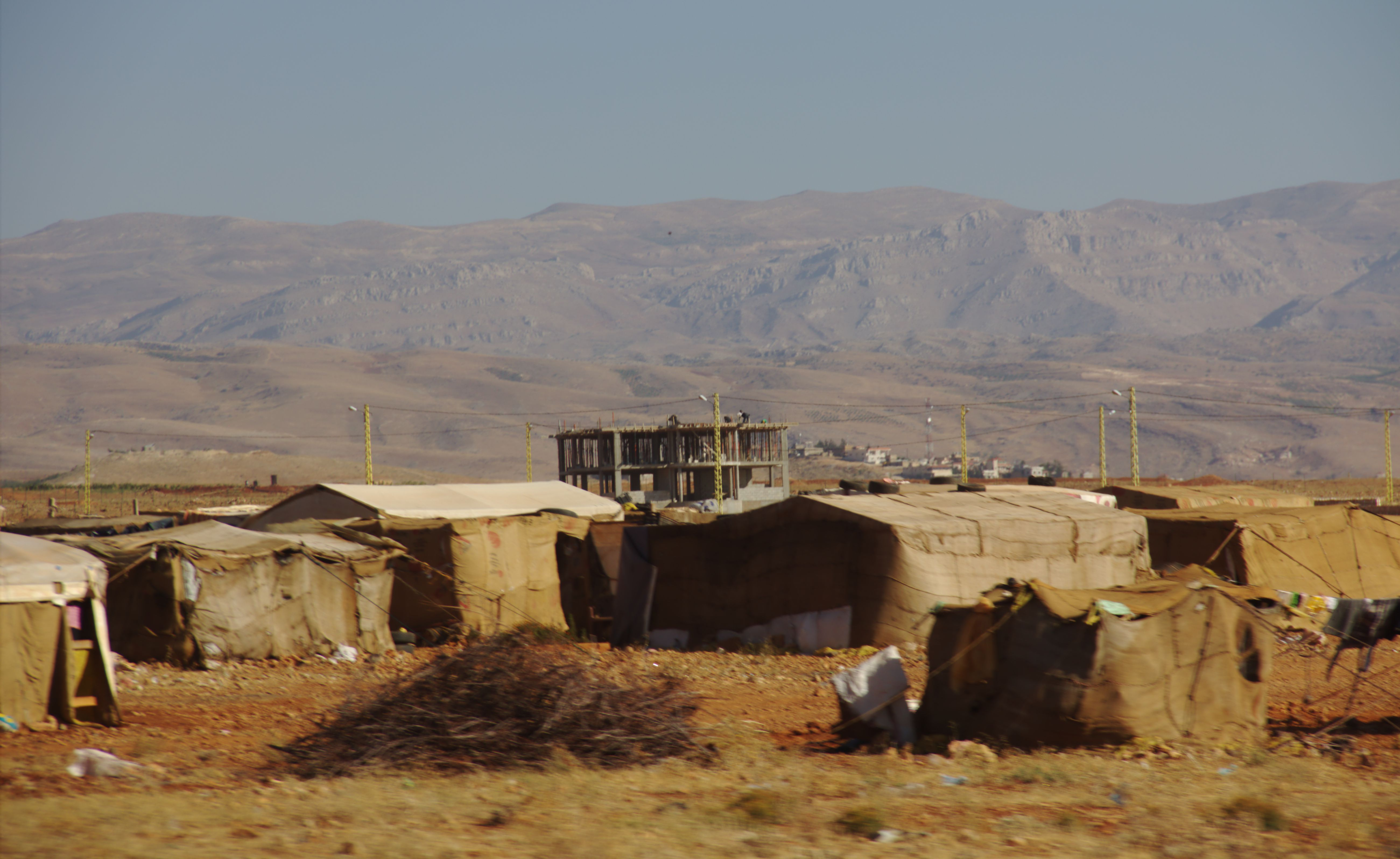
Encampment in Lebanon close to the Syrian border

Lebanon hosts about 1.5 million Syrian refugees, which amounts to more than one fourth of the total population, as of February 2017. This is by far the highest number of refugees per capita worldwide. One million refugees are registered with UNHCR, but the figure did not change since 2015, when the government suspended further registration; entering Lebanon has become close to impossible for the remaining Syrian refugees. There were 280,000 Palestinian refugees before the Syrian crisis, 32,000 more fled from Syria. Around 6,000 Iraqi refugees also fled to Lebanon. Additionally, 1-1.5 million Lebanese are in need of humanitarian assistance. Public services and infrastructure are overburdened, exacerbating pre-existing economic and social problems. The Lebanese Crisis Response Plan exposes the official response to the crisis, as developed by the Lebanese government together with the UN and NGOs.

About 12% of refugee households live in informal settlements (tents from timber, plastic sheets, etc.), 17% live in non-residential buildings (worksites, garages, shops), the remaining 71% living in regular apartments, houses, or doorman rooms (micro-apartments). More than a quarter of households are overcrowded (less than 4.5 meters per person). Similarly, many were in poor conditions, with 12% being severely damaged or in risk of collapse and 14% with significant issues such as leaking roofs, damaged plumbing, etc. Refugees pay an average monthly rent of 189 U.S. dollars, including people paying to keep their tent on the land. In addition, 23% have no access to bathrooms. Less than 1% of those refugees have no access to toilets, as 55% used flush latrines and 27% used improved pit latrines.

No formal Syrian refugee camps exists in Lebanon. There are 12 pre-existing formal Palestinian refugee camps in Lebanon managed by UNRWA. While the Lebanese, Syrian, and Palestinian communities, as well as responsibilities for them, are to some extent separated, some Syrians nevertheless live in those camps, at least in the short term. However, essentially no estimates of their number are known.

=== Iraq ===
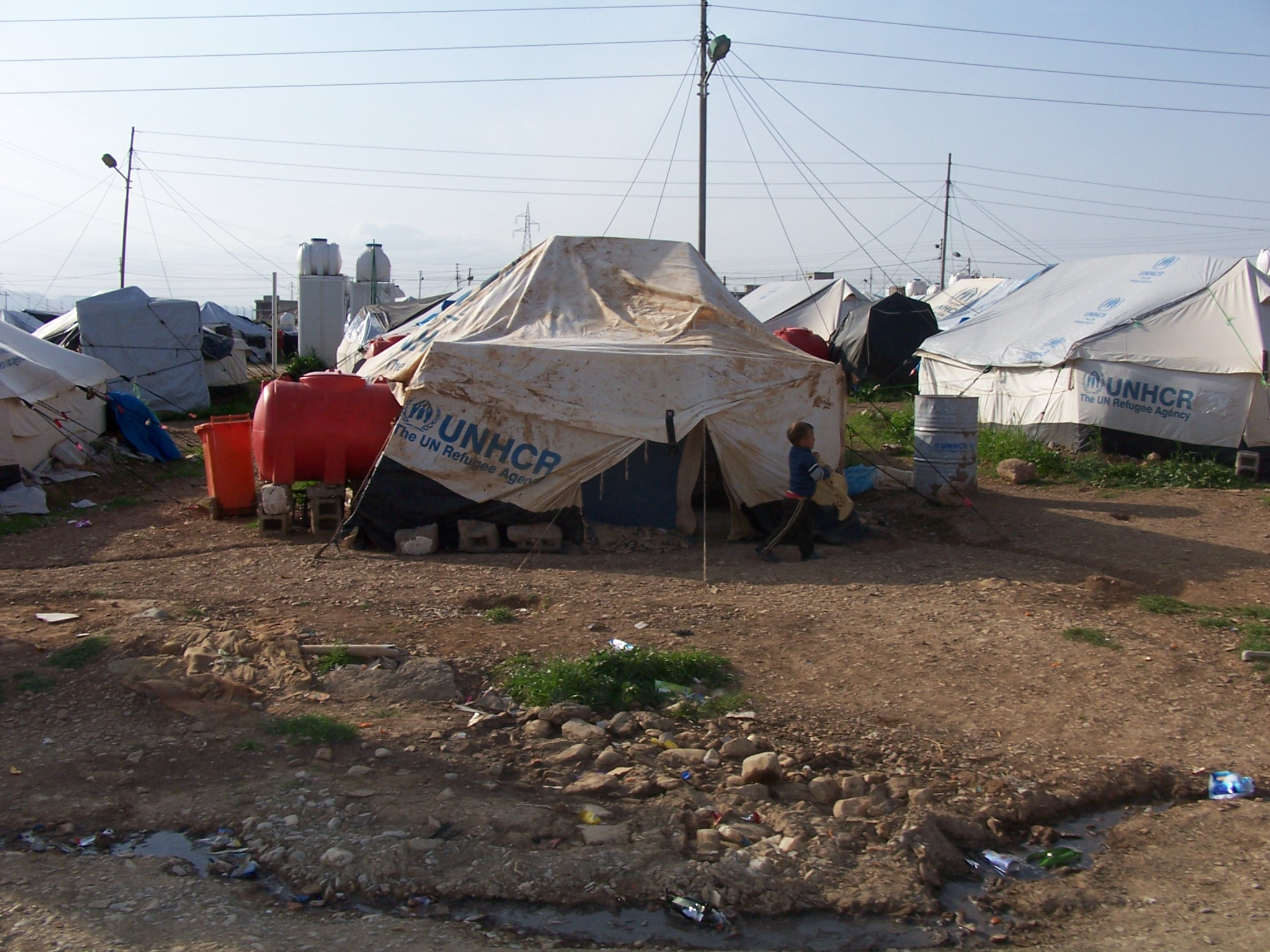
Refugee tents at Arbat Transit Camp for Syrian Refugees in Sulaymaniyah, Iraqi Kurdistan, March 2014.

There are 240,000 registered Syrian refugees in Iraq, 90,000 of whom reside in camps managed by UNHCR, IRC and the Directorate of Health. All the ten Syrian refugee camps in Iraq are within the Kurdish region. There are 40 more camps for internally displaced Iraqis.

Governorate	Camp name	Population	Total
Dohuk	Domiz 1	31,554	49,156
Dohuk	Domiz 2	8,300	49,156
Dohuk	Gawilan	8,124	49,156
Dohuk	Akre settlement	1,178	49,156
Erbil	Darashakran	12,387	32,680
Erbil	Kawergosk	9,090	32,680
Erbil	Qushtapa	7,716	32,680
Erbil	Basirma	3,487	32,680
Sulaymaniyah	Arbat	8,111	8,111
Al Anbar	Al-Obaidi	1,500?	1,500?

A camp for Syrian Kurds was also present in Moqebleh, near the city of Dohuk, but was moved several years later. The al-Obaidi camp became inaccessible to humanitarian staff from 16 June 2014, the population figure has not been updated since.

=== Egypt ===
As of February 2017, 120,000 Syrian refugees and asylum-seekers are registered in Egypt, with 80,000 more from Sudan, Ethiopia and other African countries.

== Other host countries ==
=== North Macedonia ===
- Gevgelija refugee camp
- Tabanovce refugee camp

=== Greece ===
In Greece, the refugee camps opened in response to the European migrant crisis host Syrian refugees (54.9% of arrivals) followed by Afghan (24.6%) and Iraqi refugees (11.0%). There are currently 57,042 refugees in Greece, according to data collected in 2016 by The Refugee Crisis Management Coordination Body.

Epirus

- Doliana refugee camp
- Katsikas refugee camp
- Konitsa refugee camp
- Filippiada refugee camp
- Tselepevo refugee camp

Central Macedonia

- Alexandreia refugee camp
- Cherso refugee camp
- Derveni Alexill
- Eko refugee camp (evicted)
- Diavata refugee camp
- Giannitsa refugee camp
- Idomeni refugee camp (evicted)
- Kalochori - Iliadi
- Lagadika (UNHCR) refugee camp
- Nea kavala refugee camp
- Oraiokastro refugee camp
- Piera (camping Nireas) refugee camp
- Piera (Ktima Iraklis) refugee camp
- Piera (Petra Olybou) refugee camp
- Sinatex Kavalari refugee camp
- Sindos Frakaport refugee camp
- Sindos Karamanilis building
- Softex refugee camp
- Thessaloniki port refugee camp
- Vasilika refugee camp
- Veria refugee camp
- Viagiohori refugee camp

Eastern Macedonia and Thrace

- Chalkero refugee camp
- Drama refugee camp

Western Greece

- Andravidas refugee camp

Central Greece

- Ritsona refugee camp
- Thermopiles refugee camp

Thessalia

- Kipselochori refugee camp
- Larissa refugee camp
- Volos refugee camp
- Koutsochero refugee camp

Attica

- Agios Andreas refugee camp
- Elefsina refugee camp
- Eleonas refugee camp
- Elliniko I refugee camp
- Elliniko II refugee camp
- Elliniko III refugee camp
- Lavrio refugee camp
- Lavrio accommodation facility
- Malakasa refugee camp
- Piraeus port refugee camp
- Schisto refugee camp
- Skaramagas port refugee camp
- Victoria Square refugee camp

Greek Islands, as of 10/06/2016:

North Aegean

Lesvos

- 3 transit camps
- Moria immigrant detention center- In September 2020, a fire destroyed the camp, displacing thousands of refugees. The cause of the inferno is unknown and there were no casualties. The camp housed about 13,000 people and was grossly overcrowded.

Chios

- Chios refugee camp
- Vial immigrant detention center

Samos

- 3 unnamed refugee camps
- Vathy immigrant detention center

South Aegean

Leros

- Lepida immigrant detention center

Kos

- Kos immigrant detention center

Rhodes

- Rhodes refugee camp

Non-host countries:

Germany:

Germany is home to roughly 800,000 people, as of March 2021. This number does not amount to other countries with higher number of refugees per capita worldwide due to Germany's population of nearly 84 million. During 2014-2015, a majority of these Syrian refugees came to Germany because of the Syrian Civil War. The war created the European migrant crisis, which led to hundreds of thousands of Syrian refugees dispersing. Regions in Germany with the most Syrian refugees include Munich, Berlin, Hanover, Frankfurt, etc.

After Germany's Chancellor, Angela Merkel, opened the door using its Open-Door Policy, in 2015, there was much excitement about the arrival of the refugees. These up-beat emotions quickly died down as right-wing parties wanted to have more of a say in the acceptance of Syrian refugees. The non-acceptance of refugees by right-wing parties forced the government to implement integration policies to rid of some of the tensions. A big issue is how to integrate the Syrian refugees into society to eliminate a lot of the unemployment. In 2019, the unemployment rate of Syrians in Germany was at 44.2% and the dependency on welfare was 74.9%.

The living conditions for Syrian refugees in German camps are described in a wide variety. Due to the arrival of hundreds of thousands of refugees in a short amount of time, Germany had to build emergency camps. Many of these camps lack the requisite facilities and equipment. In this process, some refugees must undergo family separation due to integration laws. This delegates family members to separate cities in some cases. Nonetheless, there is reason to believe that Germany's integration efforts will progress in the future. Syrian refugees would eventually be able to exit the camps and relocate with their families. Statistics from a study done by the Institute for Employment Research show that the refugee unemployment rate has dropped in the past few years. Such integration actions would also assist refugees in obtaining asylum and exercising their civil rights.

== See also ==
- Palestinian refugee camps
- Sahrawi refugee camps
