= Jibrin =

Jibrin جبرين
- Village
- Location in Syria
- Coordinates: 35°10′0″N 36°47′20″E
- Country: Syria
- Governorate: Hama
- District: Hama
- Subdistrict: Hama

Population (2004)
  - Total: 3,991
- Time zone: UTC+3 (AST)
- City Qrya Pcode: C2969

For people with the surname, see Jibrin (surname).

Jibrin (Arabic: جبرين) is a Syrian village and suburb of Hama, located in the Hama Subdistrict of the Hama District in the Hama Governorate. According to the Syria Central Bureau of Statistics (CBS), Jibrin had a population of 3,991 in the 2004 census.
