= Thessaloniki port refugee camp =

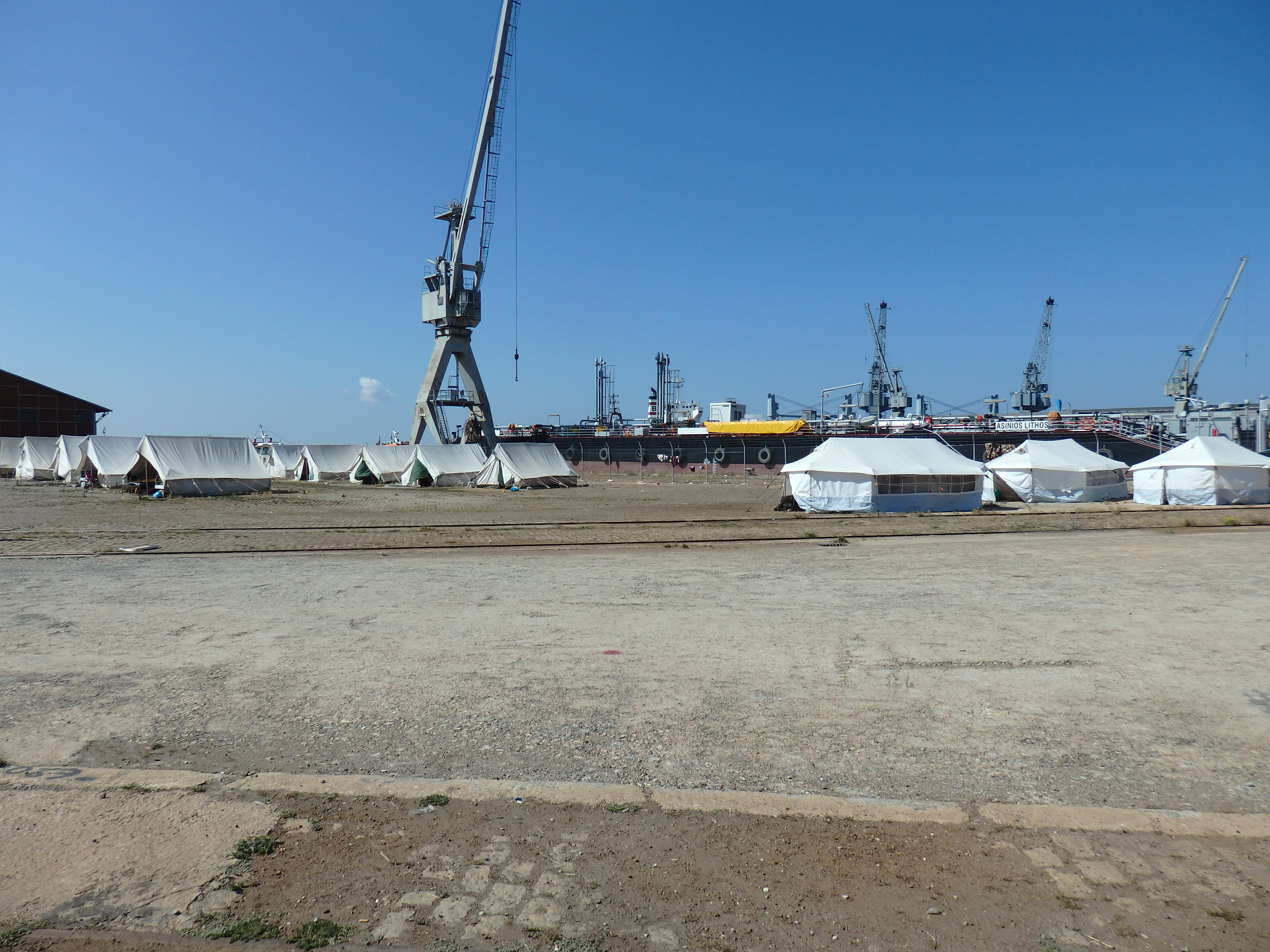

Thessaloniki port refugee camp is a refugee camp opened the 17 March 2016 and run by the Municipality of Thessaloniki, located in the port of Thessaloniki. As of 14 April 2016, there were 382 refugees in the camp, 95% of which were Syrian and 5% were Iraqi.
