= Internally displaced persons in Syria =

Human toll of the Syrian civil war
- Pre-war population 22 ±.5; Internally displaced 6 ±.5, Refugees 5.5 ±.5, Fatalities 0.5 ±.1 (millions)

Syrian refugees
- By country: Turkey, Lebanon, Egypt, Jordan
- Settlements: Camps: Jordan

Internally displaced Syrians

Casualties of the war
- Crimes: War crimes, massacres, rape

Internally displaced persons in Syria are more than half the people fleeing the Syrian Civil War moved only within Syria itself. The United Nations High Commissioner for Refugees (UNHCR) estimates that 7 million persons in Syria are internally displaced or in need of humanitarian assistance, as of 2017. Most live in houses, often badly damaged by the war. Due to security concerns, poor access to areas of need and unpredictability, humanitarian efforts were directed at emergency aid. The complexity of administrative procedures and limited capacity of NGOs permitted to operate in Syria are also cited as challenges to assistance.

While legal definitions of "refugee" do not apply to them, they are often referred to as such. The term internally displaced person (IDP) is used to distinguish them, with "(forcibly) displaced person" applying to both groups.

== Humanitarian Aid ==
Shelter aid for internally displaced persons is coordinated mainly by the Global Shelter Cluster (co-led by UNHCR, IFRC and the Syrian Ministry of Local Administration). No formal camps were set up, but some public buildings are rehabilitated as collective short-term shelters. For example, of the 90,000 people from east Aleppo registered by the UN, the vast majority live in houses, but 4,250 remain in the Jibreen collective shelter, as of January 2017. More people are targeted by programs of help in upgrading private unfinished buildings and of winterization and shelter kit distribution (blankets, light construction materials, tools, etc.). Only recently has the situation allowed for implementing more durable solutions: full, long-term rehabilitation of damaged houses to basic living conditions, light infrastructure repair and legal help. In 2016, collective shelters were rehabilitated for 24,000 persons, kits were distributed to 26,000 people, 40,000 benefited from private building upgrades, 12,000 from long-term house repairs, and 5,000 from basic infrastructure repair.

== Foreign Refugees ==
Until 2011, UNRWA provided services in 12 camps administered by Syrian authorities, including Homs and Yarmouk. As of 2016, the UNRWA estimated that 450,000 Palestinian refugees remain in Syria, of whom up to 280,000 are internally displaced, and an estimated 43,000 are trapped in hard-to-reach locations. Some continue to be displaced multiple times as a result of armed violence. Additionally, 120,000 are displaced to neighboring countries. Many sustained extensive damage and were forcibly displaced due to armed conflict.

PA President Mahmoud Abbas contacted the UN Secretary-General about the situation, and the latter tried to broker a deal with Israel to allow Palestinian refugees living in Syria to resettle in the West Bank and Gaza. However, when Israel agreed, with the condition that they give up any future appeal to remain permanently in the country, Abbas rejected it and said "it's better they die in Syria than give [this demand] up". As of January 2017, UNRWA manages 9 shelters with about 2,600 Palestinian refugees and provides cash, food and non-food items to many more.

== See also ==
- Palestinian refugee camps
