= Jibrin (surname) =

Jibrin is a surname. Notable people with the surname include:

- Abdulmumin Jibrin (born 1976), Nigerian politician, businessman and academic
- Augustine Jibrin (born 1988), Nigerian football player
- Barau I Jibrin (born 1959), Nigerian politician
- Bello Jibrin Gada (born 1954), Nigerian politician
- Usman Oyibe Jibrin (born 1959), Nigerian naval officer
- Usman Jibrin (1942–2011), Nigerian politician
