= Refugees of the Syrian civil war in Jordan =

Human toll of the Syrian civil war
- Pre-war population 22 ±.5; Internally displaced 6 ±.5, Refugees 5.5 ±.5, Fatalities 0.5 ±.1 (millions)

Syrian refugees
- By country: Turkey, Lebanon, Egypt, Jordan
- Settlements: Camps: Jordan

Internally displaced Syrians

Casualties of the war
- Crimes: War crimes, massacres, rape

Refugees in Jordan rose with the uprising against the Syrian government and its President Bashar al-Assad. Close to 13,000 Syrians per day began pouring into Jordan to reside in its refugee camps.

As a small, aid-dependent country already suffering from financial and environmental issues, the number of Syrians seeking refuge in Jordan has created a strain on the country's resources, especially water and agriculture. As one of the top ten driest countries in the world, Jordanians' livelihood is already at risk, and the influx of new residents has only exacerbated the issue of water scarcity.

== Syrian Civil War refugees ==
In the wake of the uprising against the Syrian government and its President Bashar al-Assad, beginning in 2011, close to 2,000 Syrians per day began pouring into Jordan to reside in the first refugee camp near Mafraq, created by the UNHCR. As a small, aid-dependent country, already suffering from financial and environmental issues, the number of Syrians seeking refuge in Jordan has strained the country's resources especially water and agriculture. Jordan is one of the top ten driest countries in the world which endangers its citizens' livelihoods. The huge number of refugees has resulted in humanitarian aid organizations requesting more money and assistance from international powers. As of November 2015, UNHCR reported that there are 4,289,994 Syrian "persons of concern" of whom 630,776 are registered as refugees in Jordan. There are about 1.8 million Syrian refugees in Jordan, only 20 percent are living in the Za’atari, Marjeeb al-Fahood, Cyber City and Al-Azraq refugee camps. With the majority of the Syrian refugees interspersed throughout the state, especially in Amman, Irbid, Al-Mafraq, and Jerash, environmental resources are scarce for both Syrians and their Jordanian hosts. This increases pressure on Jordan's infrastructure, specifically the provision of water supplies, sanitation facilities, housing, and energy.

As Syrians continue to flow into Jordan, tensions continue to rise and create pressure on its society. Tensions between Jordanian hosts and Syrian refugees are most prevalent in the cities and surrounding areas outside of refugee camps, where the majority have been relocated. In absorbing space, resources, jobs, and water over an extended period of time, these Syrian refugees might soon come into conflict with Jordanian residents. The "true" cost of hosting the refugees includes electricity and water subsidies costing the Jordanian government around $3,000 per year, per Syrian, as well as half of the Health Ministry's budget for medical care or $350 million. Roughly 160,000 jobs have been given to illegal Syrian workers while 20 percent of Jordan's citizens remain unemployed.

According to the UN high commissioner's figures, the Azraq refugee camp had fewer than 23,000 refugees as of August 2015 though its capacity is 50,000. The UN plans call for Azraq to hold more than 100,000 Syrians, making it the largest refugee camp in Jordan. The nearby Zaatari refugee camp had about 80,000 refugees, according to the UN agency.

Overall, Jordan has taken in more than 630,000 registered Syrians since the crisis began in 2011, and Jordanian government estimates place the total refugee count including unregistered migrants at over 1.4 million. The United States has provided nearly $668 million in support, promising $3 billion over the next three years in general aid to support the Jordanian government.

Jordan is stepping up its scrutiny of incoming refugees having determined that many people waiting on the Syrian-Jordanian border are not Syrians and could, in fact, be tied to foreign fighter groups.

In another development, in late 2015, aid officials and refugees themselves said that Syrians, sensing that the war in their homeland would not end in the near future, are leaving Jordan for Europe in growing numbers encouraged friends and relatives who are already there, pushed out by cuts in UN food aid. Jordan says it hosts more than 1 million Syrians in total, but the numbers are starting to fall. The UN's World Food Programme, which feeds more than half a million refugees in Jordan, says the number of aid recipients fell by about 2,000 in September and 3,000 in October. In a random survey of refugees in October 2015 by the UNHCR, 25 per cent said they were actively planning to leave Jordan.

In September 2020, the United Nations announced the first two coronavirus infections in a Syrian refugee encampment in the country. Following the positive tests, the two refugees were transferred from the camp to an isolation site. As of September 2020, Jordan has reported around 2,500 coronavirus cases and 17 deaths throughout the country.

=== Water scarcity ===
There has been an “ongoing drought devastating agricultural prospects in the country’s northern areas for almost ten years,” making Jordan one of the driest countries in the world. The strain on water resources has been exacerbated by the huge “influx” of Syrian refugees to the Zaatari refugee camp, located in the border cities of Ar-Ramtha and Mafraq. As a result of “rapid population growth,” the quantity of drinkable water available on average to the Jordanian population is less than 150 cubic meters per year. The renewable water supply, provided by rainfall, only creates 50 percent “of the total water consumption” so the remainder must be extracted from “aquifers that are slowly being depleted.” Water is one resource without the capacity for foreign support, forcing Jordanians to make do with their own resources. Jordan, as a nation, depends largely on foreign aid and its scarce water resources are not renewable. The extraction of groundwater has sustained the population in recent decades but, with the influx of Syrian refugees, the supply of groundwater is declining. One can purchase expensive water sold by the truckload by local businessmen, but most cannot afford this luxury. Humanitarian aid organizations like Oxfam and Mercy Corps have made efforts to uncover more water in the Za’atari camp by digging wells, but this will only provide temporary, small-scale relief. While the issue of water scarcity in Jordan is real, there is also a political dimension to the intersection of the issues of water scarcity and refugee influx. According to Hussam Hussein, the Jordanian government has been supporting a narrative blaming issues like refugee influx and nature for water scarcity over a narrative of water mismanagement.

The US Agency for International Development in combination with Mercy Corps has created a project that will cost $20 million and will find a way to revive Jordanian water systems. USAID has also funded water conservation efforts in Za’atari village, subsidizing cisterns to store rainwater for individual families. These groundwater harvesting systems are part of an initiative begun in 2006 by Mercy Corps, the Jordan River Foundation, and the Royal Scientific Society, with the assistance of over 135 local Jordanian organizations to help rural families find affordable and clean water. The program is called the Community-Based Initiative for Water Demand Management. The system pipes water down to ground level where a storage container allows each family to collect and save water for themselves. Mercy Corps has taken action in the Za’atari camp drilling two wells to build a pump station, as well as a chlorination system, to supply clean water to a large number of refugees there. Mercy Corps also plans to work with the new Al-Azraq camp in “constructing a new water supply system.” In the Jordanian communities of Mafraq and Ramtha, Mercy Corps is working to repair municipal water systems to fix leaks that will potentially increase water availability up to 25 percent. Aid organizations’ humanitarian efforts have become focused on sustaining the long-term survival and cohesion of Syrian refugees and Jordanians, as explained by Dr. Ibrahim Sayf, Jordan's minister of planning and international cooperation. Due to Jordan's lack of water resources, these humanitarian efforts are designed to alleviate the burden of water scarcity exacerbated by the increased population in the wake of the Syrian revolution.

In November 2025, according to reports, Switzerland's Embassy and UNICEF agreed to provide $3.5 million to improve water and sanitation services for vulnerable children and families in the camps and Jordanian communities. The money will help make the country's water and sanitation systems stronger, more reliable, and better able to cope with climate challenges, continuing Switzerland's long partnership with UNICEF and support for children's rights. This renewed cooperation also supports Jordan's own plans and the global Sustainable Development Goals at a time when the country's resources are under heavy pressure.

=== Sexual and Gender-Based Violence Among Refugee Women and Girls ===
Gender-based violence (GBV) is a term that includes violence that is sexual, physical, mental, or economic in nature.1 This violence can be inflicted in public or in private and can also include coercion, manipulation, and threats of violence. Examples of GBV are intimate partner violence (IPV), child marriage, sexual assault, female genital mutilation, and honor crimes. GBV typically stems from unequal power dynamics between the perpetrator and the subject of the violence, in this case rooted gender inequity. Research shows that refugee populations are at a higher susceptibility of experiencing GBV, due to risk factors such as armed conflict and proximity to armed actors, displacement, deteriorating socioeconomic and environmental conditions, and a lack of security on settlement premises.

Syrian refugee populations are unlike any other refugee population, because 93.7% of refugees reside in urban areas and not refugee camps. Stability, opportunity, and access are not necessarily guaranteed in an urban setting. In fact, over 60% of Syrian refugees live in poverty. There is inequitable access and distribution of basic needs and services, as well as unequal access to educational opportunities or employment. As for GBV, it is an interesting and important case study for the intersection of displacement, trauma, and semi-permanent settlement in poor urban zones.

Jordan hosts millions of refugees from Syria, Iraq, Yemen, Lebanon, Palestine, Somalia, and Sudan. The majority of refugees do not live in refugee settlements, rather they live in the host community and are mostly concentrated in Amman. Women and girls make up more than half of the Syrian refugee population, with evidence shows that young Syrian refugee women experience GBV at the hands of their husbands and family members, Jordanian men, and even aid workers. Locations where GBV take place include the home, at work, at school and in public areas.

Inside refugee camps, girls aged 12 to 18 years are typically the targets of domestic and sexual violence. Many stated that they experienced more SGBV since their displacement. Among Syrian refugees, rates of child marriages increased 14% from 2012 to the first quarter of 2014. More than half the female respondents of one study were married before the age of 18. A little more than 12% of girls under 17 facing “some” or “a lot” of physical violence. We must acknowledge that these statistics are lower than the real numbers. One study showed that 30% of respondents refused to respond to or claimed not to have knowledge that physical or emotional violence might take place, while 60% said the same for sexual violence.

One study showed that 83% of refugees reported that they had no knowledge of services available to GBV survivors and almost 15% of respondents believed that girls could not access health services. Only 3.9% of respondents felt that they would go to a health clinic for help as a first choice after experiencing sexual violence, while 12.1% of respondents felt they would treat a health clinic as a first choice after experiencing psychological violence. Resources for GBV survivors include, but are not limited to, Salma (Life is Possible Without Violence), Aisha (Arab Woman Forum), the Arab Women Organization, the Sisterhood is Global Institute, and various other governmental and non-governmental services managed by the Jordan Hashemite Charity Organization for Relief and Development (JHCO).

=== Jordan Compact ===
Jordan was heavily impacted by the number of Syrian refugees crossing the border. To manage the flood of refugees, Jordan has had to rely heavily in aid from foreign governments and other international aid. One of the most notable is what is commonly referred to as the Jordan Compact. This Compact was signed at a high-level conference in London in February 2016 between Jordan and the European Union (EU). The main principles of the Compact were agreed upon by King Abdullah II of Jordan, the World Bank President Jim Kim, and the Prime Minister of the United Kingdom David Cameron at the United Nations General Assembly in 2015. It was negotiated further by Imad Fakhoury, the Jordanian Prime Minister of Planning; Shanta Devarjan, the World Bank's chief economist for the Middle East and North Africa; and Stefan Dercon, the UK Department for International Development's chief economist. It outlined the international community's support and responsibility to Jordan for hosting the Syrian refugees. The International Monetary Fund (IMF) and the World Bank additionally implemented the Jordan Compact. The main goal of the Compact was to turn the Syrian refugee crisis into an opportunity for the development of the Jordanian economy. It shifted the focus of short-term humanitarian aid to growth investments, education, and job creation both for the Syrian refugees and Jordanian citizens. It pledged $12 billion in grants and more than $40 in the region up until 2020. The main target of the agreement was formal market access while Jordan was to issue 200,000 work permits for Syrian refugees in specified sectors. It committed the EU to relax trade regulations to stimulate exports from eighteen designated economic zones and industrial areas in Jordan in return for employment quotas for Syrian refugees in these businesses.

The jobs offered were limited largely to the garment sector, construction, the service industry, handicrafts and textiles, and janitorial work. Jordan also committed to supporting Syrian education through the “Accelerating Access to Quality Formal Education Plan”. Jordan had to commit to providing schools to all Syrian children and some vocational training opportunities. While the Compact was made to benefit a failing economy being additionally harmed by the massive refugee population, there are criticisms of the approach. One of the main criticisms is that the Compact exclusively applied to Syrian refugees, despite the other refugee populations residing in the country. The only time other populations are mentioned in the official documents of the Compact is to further show Jordan's existing burden, not to lay out actions to address their impoverishment. The loans that are given by the World Bank can only be acquired when linked to Syrians. This incentivized the government to focus primarily on this one refugee population. Further criticisms include the fact that donor support was made conditional on the refugees' employment and containment in Jordan. The refugees were given clearer refugee status and protections in return for potential economic productivity. The priority on agriculture, labor, and manufacturing implied a focus largely on men with the exclusion of women even though twenty-three percent of Syrian households in Jordan were headed by women in 2016. Another criticism is that the negotiation process largely didn't include actors bringing in humanitarian and refugee perspectives.

== See also ==
- Minorities in Jordan
- List of Syrian refugee camps in Jordan
- Refugees of the Syrian Civil War
- Syrian refugee camps
