= List of Syrian refugee camps in Jordan =

Human toll of the Syrian civil war
- Pre-war population 22 ±.5; Internally displaced 6 ±.5, Refugees 5.5 ±.5, Fatalities 0.5 ±.1 (millions)

Syrian refugees
- By country: Turkey, Lebanon, Egypt, Jordan
- Settlements: Camps: Jordan

Internally displaced Syrians

Casualties of the war
- Crimes: War crimes, massacres, rape

Syrian refugee camps in Jordan were built following the influx of 1.4 million Syrians, escaping the Syrian Civil War. There are 5 Syrian refugee camps in Jordan, 3 of which are official while the rest are temporary. However, only 650,000 Syrians are registered with the United Nations, and around 90% of Syrians do not live in these camps, but in Jordanian towns and cities.

These are:

- Zaatari (opened July 2012)
- Mrajeeb Al Fhood (opened April 2013)
- Azraq (opened April 2014)
- King Abdullah Park (KAP) (in Irbid Governorate, opened 2012; small camp housing Syrians and Palestinians)

== Location of camps ==
UNCHR 2018 map of refugee camps and settlements in Jordan here does not show Hadallat.

Older map:

Location of Syrian refugee camps in Jordan.

== See also ==
- Refugees of the Syrian Civil War in Jordan
- Syrian refugee camps
- Syrian diaspora
- Syrians in Jordan
