= Rape during the Syrian civil war =

Human toll of the Syrian civil war
- Pre-war population 22 ±.5; Internally displaced 6 ±.5, Refugees 5.5 ±.5, Fatalities 0.5 ±.1 (millions)

Syrian refugees
- By country: Turkey, Lebanon, Egypt, Jordan
- Settlements: Camps: Jordan

Internally displaced Syrians

Casualties of the war
- Crimes: War crimes, massacres, rape

Rape during the Syrian civil war was used as a strategy throughout the Syrian conflict by pro government supporters, members of the Free Syrian Army, and militants fighting for the Islamic State of Iraq and the Levant. According to the International Rescue Committee (IRC) rape has been a "significant and disturbing feature" during the conflict, and the primary reason given for 600,000 women fleeing the war zone is fear of sexual assault. For the background and legal content use the prosecution of Syrian civil war criminals. Human Rights Watch have requested that the United Nations Security Council refer Syria to the International Criminal Court.

== Syrian state forces ==
Following the onset of the Arab spring, which had spread to Syria in 2011, reports of rape by pro-government forces increased. In Daraa, at the onset of the conflict state forces organized the rape of women in the region.

In Syria women who are raped can become victims of honour killings, or if allowed by their families to live are no longer eligible for marriage. When the state forces began their crackdown on protesters in Jisr al-Shugour a tactic used was raiding homes in which women were sleeping. A report released by Save the Children in 2013 stated, "There is proof that girls and boys scarcely over the age of 12 have experienced sexual violence, including both torture to their genitals and rape." Sarah Leah, the director for the Middle East branch of HRW has said that, "Syrian security forces have used sexual violence… with complete impunity".

A UN report published in 2015 stated:

Women and girls were found to have been raped and sexually assaulted in government detention facilities, in particular in the investigation branches of the Military Intelligence Directorate and prisons administered by the General Security Directorate in Damascus. State officials have perpetrated rape, a crime against humanity. ... Victim and witness accounts of sexual violence were also recorded in northern governorates. During house searches in Aleppo city in 2012 and 2013, Government forces sexually assaulted women and men in their homes. In 2013, detainees were raped in the Political Security branch and sexual assaulted at the Military Security branch in Latakia. Many women and men, including minors, have been victims of the deliberate use of sexual humiliation, sexual torture and rape while in the custody of Government authorities throughout the span of the unrest and conflict in Syria (from 2011 – 2014).

== ISIS ==
During the Yazidis genocide, ISIS sold women into sexual slavery and raped girls as young as nine. Amar Hussein, a captured IS militant who has admitted to raping over 200 women, stated that those in command had given free rein to IS fighters to rape as many Yazidi women as they wanted.

A pamphlet published online by ISIS on the social media platform Twitter explicitly endorsed the rape of children; it reads: "It is permissible to have intercourse with the female slave who hasn't reached puberty, if she is fit for intercourse".

== International reactions ==
In 2012 in a declaration by the UN stated that in Syria rape was being used as a weapon of war, however the help being given to victims was "sorely lacking", and that "Hospitals and clinics are not equipped to deal with the sheer volume of victims, and many victims do not report their attacks."

The NGO Euro-Mediterranean Human Rights Network (EMHRN) released a report in November 2013 stated that, since the conflict began in 2011, approximately 6,000 women had been raped, which included gang-rapes, with figures likely to be far higher given that the majority cases go unreported. According to the EMHRN report the majority of documented attacks have occurred during government-backed attacks on rebel positions, on those kept in detention and at checkpoints.

Speaking at the UN in 2012, Norwegian Foreign Minister Espen Barth Eide stated that the rapes which occurred during the Bosnian war were being repeated in Syria, with rapes in the tens of thousands.

During the first 11 months of 2013 the UN Population Fund (UNFPA) released figures which showed that it had given psychological help to 33,430 people in Syria who had been victims of either rape or gender based violence, with a further 4,800 cases reported in December 2013. Jody Williams of the International Campaign to Stop Rape & Gender Violence in Conflict has said of the sexual violence being visited on the men, women and children of Syria, "With every war and major conflict, as an international community we say 'never again' to mass rape, Yet, in Syria, as countless women are again finding the war waged on their bodies--we are again standing by and wringing our hands."

== Bibliography ==
- BBC (26 November 2013). "Syria conflict: Women 'targets of abuse and torture'". BBC.
- Bentley, Michelle (2016). Syria and the Chemical Weapons Taboo: Exploiting the Forbidden. Manchester University Press. p. 109. ISBN 978-1526104717.
- Brinkley, Joel (6 September 2013). "War Rape: Rwanda, Bosnia, and Now Syria". World Affairs. Archived from the original on 9 September 2013.
- Callimachi, Rukmini (13 August 2013). "ISIS Enshrines a Theology of Rape". New York Times.
- Fitzpatrick, Brenda (2016). Tactical Rape in War and Conflict: International Recognition and Response. Policy Press. p. 33. ISBN 978-1447326694.
- Flock, Elizabeth (21 June 2011). "Women in the Arab Spring: The other side of the story". Washington Post.
- Georgy, Michael (17 February 2017). "Captive Islamic State militant says mass rapes were 'normal'". Reuters.
- Harvey, Allison (1 September 2015). "UN Inaction and Rape as a Weapon of War in Syria". Harvard Health Policy Review. Archived from the original on 8 October 2022.
- Jackson, Allison (26 November 2013). "6,000 cases of women raped during Syrian conflict, human rights group says". Public Radio International.
- Litsas, Spyridon N.; Tziampiris, Aristotle (2015). The Eastern Mediterranean in Transition: Multipolarity, Politics and Power. Routledge. p. 202. ISBN 978-1472440396.
- Miles, Tom (8 January 2013). "U.N. aided 38,000 victims of Syrian gender-based violence in 2013". Reuters.
- Omar, Manal (18 March 2015). "The Women in the Middle of the War". Foreign Policy.
- Minano, Leila; Andrzejewski, Cécile (2 July 2017). "How The Assad Regime Used Child Rape Aa a Weapon Of War". Zero Impunity.
- Priddy, Alice (2014). "Sexual Violence in Armed Conflict in 2012". In Casey-Maslen, Stuart (ed.). The War Report: 2012. Oxford University Press. p. 320. ISBN 978-0199689088.
- Proudman, Charlotte R (21 January 2013). "War rape: The forgotten pandemic sweeping Syria". The Independent.
- Tuysuz, Gul (20 June 2011). "Syrian men promise to marry women who were raped". Washington Post.
- Wolfe, Lauren (3 April 2013). "Syria Has a Massive Rape Crisis". The Atlantic.
- Wintour, Patrick (16 June 2016). "UN condemns Isis genocide against Yazidis in Iraq and Syria". The Guardian.
