= Homs Camp =

Palestinian refugee camp in Syria

Coordinates: 34°42′30.29″N 36°42′26.62″E

Homs camp is a Palestinian refugee camp within the city of Homs, Syria, and around 160 kilometers (99 mi) north of Damascus. As of 2002, the camp had a population of 13,825 inhabitants.

The camp was established in 1949 following the displacement of Palestinians during the 1948 Arab-Israeli War on an area of 150,000 square meters. It is adjacent to Homs University and most of the refugees are originally from the villages surrounding Haifa and Acre in northern Palestine. Today, the majority of the refugees are wage laborers, local civil servants or street vendors.

According to the UNRWA, poor environmental health is a major concern as it affects the quality of life and poses health risks for the refugees. The sewage system needs to be expanded to cope with the increasing camp population. The schools are old and dilapidated condition, and some have major structural defects. The UNRWA's main priority in the camp is to reconstruct the schools to provide improved educational facilities.

In 1996, the UNRWA constructed a new health center with a contribution from the United States government. A new community rehabilitation center for disabled people was built in 1999 in partnership with MOVIMONDO Molisv (an Italian non-governmental organization) with funds from the European Community Humanitarian Office (ECHO).
