= Refugees of the Syrian civil war in Lebanon =

Human toll of the Syrian civil war
- Pre-war population 22 ±.5; Internally displaced 6 ±.5, Refugees 5.5 ±.5, Fatalities 0.5 ±.1 (millions)

Syrian refugees
- By country: Turkey, Lebanon, Egypt, Jordan
- Settlements: Camps: Jordan

Internally displaced Syrians

Casualties of the war
- Crimes: War crimes, massacres, rape

Since the onset of the Syrian Civil War in March 2011, over 1.5 million Syrian refugees have fled to Lebanon, and constitute nearly one-fourth of the Lebanese population today. Lebanon currently holds the largest refugee population per capita in the world. In July 2025, the United Nations High Commissioner for Refugees (UNHCR) announced that 205,000 individuals had returned to their home country since December 2024.

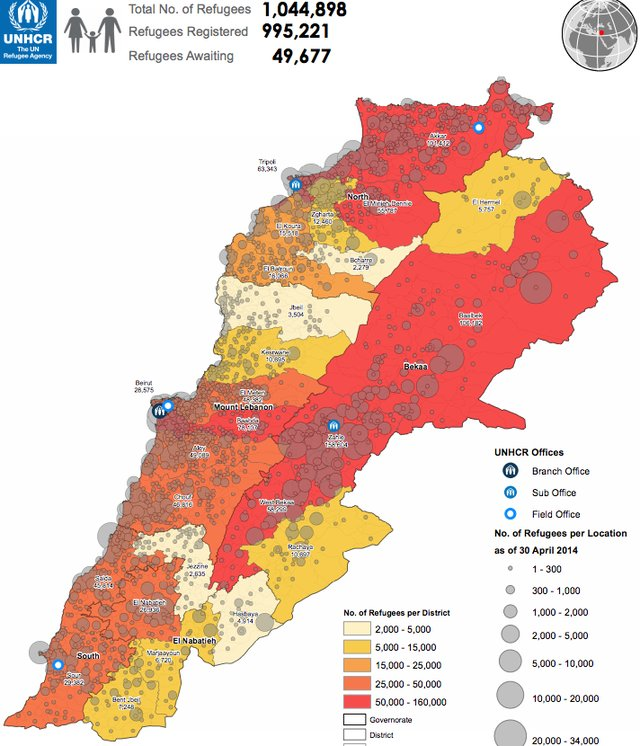
Distribution of Syrian refugees in Lebanon (April 2014)

UNHCR statistics indicate a massive influx of Syrian refugees into Lebanon between 2012 and 2014, which overwhelmed Lebanon's already crumbling infrastructure and public institutions. Between August and December 2012, the number of Syrian refugees increased from 36,000 to approximately 150,000; by May 2013, the number had increased to 463,000, and by October 2014, 1,151,057. These numbers only serve as estimates, however, given other refugees' fear of registering with what they believed to be a pro-Assad Lebanese government. The majority of Syrian refugees reside in Northern Lebanon (Akkar District) or the Beqaa Valley, Lebanon's two poorest regions. Despite cooperation between NGOs and Government Institutions to provide necessary aid to Syrian refugee populations, refugees struggle to access the aid due to legal status, resource scarcity, poverty and lack of information distribution on these resources.

On 29 July 2025, an official Lebanese source stated that, starting in January 2026, no Syrian will remain in Lebanon under the status of "displaced person."

== Statistics ==
As of 31 January 2020, the official distribution of registered Syrian refugees in Lebanon is as follows:

UNHCR Official Population Distribution
Location	Population	% of the total Population
Bekaa	344,013	37.8%
North Lebanon	241,102	26.5%
Beirut	222,944	24.5%
South Lebanon	102,197	11.2%
Total	910,256	100%

Of registered Syrian refugees in Lebanon, 55.3% are between the ages of 0 and 17.

Along with Syrians, the influx of refugees due to the Syrian civil war included 35,000 Lebanese returnees and 31,502 Palestinian refugees from Syria.

As of 2023, most Lebanese sources estimate that the Syrian population in Lebanon has reached between 1.5-2 million refugees. This is mainly due the extremely high birthrates and the number of those that are unregistered in UNHCR.

== Refugee conditions in Lebanon ==
=== Employment ===
The Lebanese government sought to protect its domestic workers from the sudden influx of competing workers by denying Syrian refugees the possibility of legal employment. A 2013 World Bank report found that the influx of Syrian refugees doubled Lebanon's unemployment rate, particularly impacting unskilled youth. To maintain their livelihoods, many refugees resorted to child labor and prostitution, increasing the pressure on them to return to Syria or leave Lebanon for other destinations.

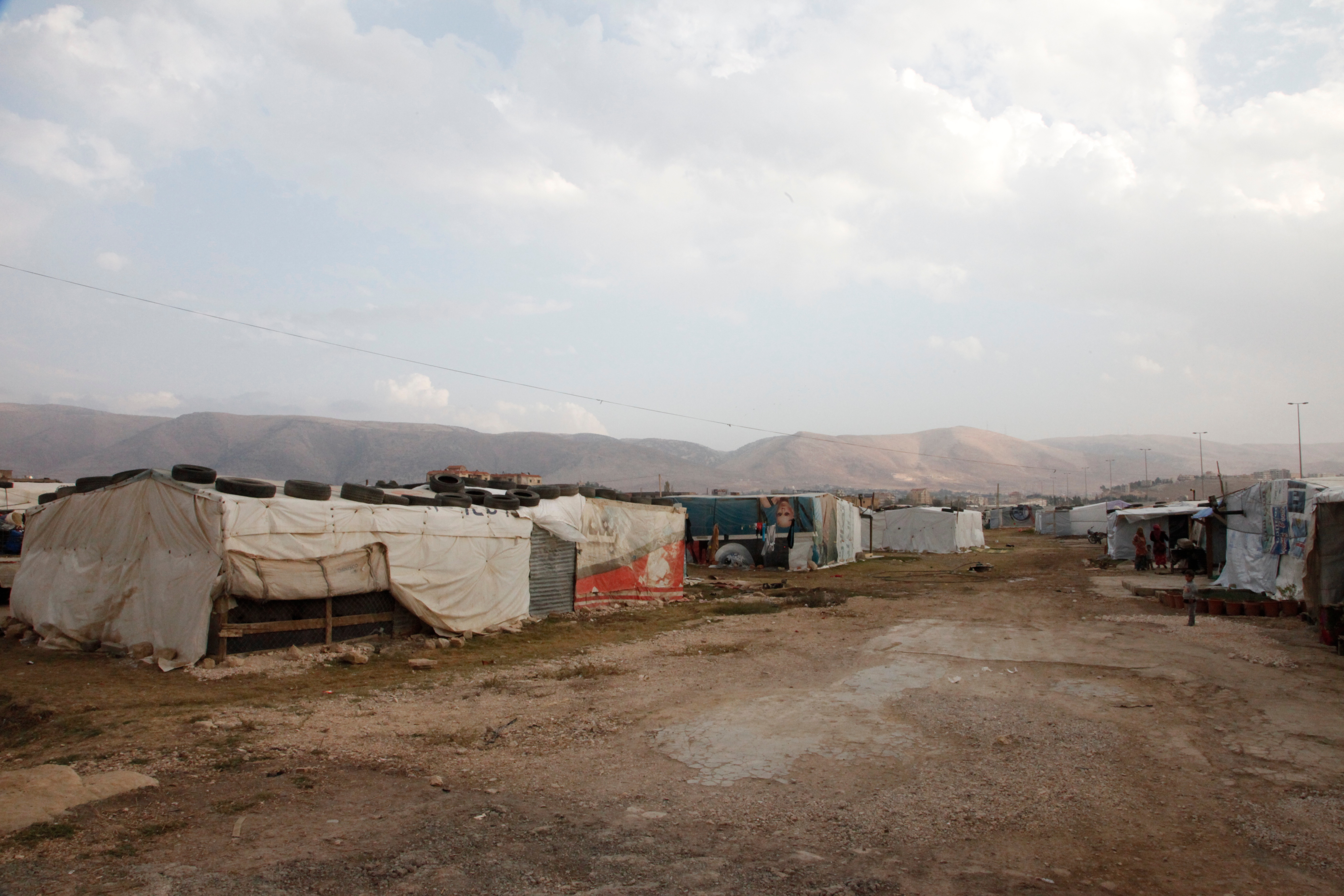
An informal tented settlement in Lebanon's Beqaa Valley

Between 2011 and 2013, the International Rescue Committee estimated that wages in the service and agricultural sectors dropped as much as 50%. As a result, Syrian refugees, with significant competition from local Lebanese workers, opened informal businesses selling products below market prices. These businesses are not sufficient to impact the impoverished situation of most refugees.

In 2014, the International Labour Organization estimated that 50% of young Syrians did not have activities to generate income, and this figure was raised to 66% among young women. The majority of Syrians find work as low- to semi-skilled laborers, with an estimated 92% working without set contracts. As such, this temporary work is heavily underpaid, intermittent, and outside of Lebanese labor protections, and fails to offer financial or job security. One in ten displaced Syrian children in Lebanon is forced to complement family income through work, and is subjected to child marriage, drug and alcohol abuse, violent groups, and begging.

=== Housing ===
The Lebanese government refused to set up official refugee camps to avoid the permanent settlement of Syrian refugees in Lebanon. Instead, Syrian refugees were initially sheltered in accommodation centers and any available housing as long as there was room. The majority of Syrian refugees (some 1.1 million) had to build their makeshift shelters ("informal tented settlements") of poor quality on land rented from private landowners. Refugees also sought shelter in rented rooms, apartments, and garages. A 2014 assessment indicated that 30% of Syrian households lacked sufficient water, 15% lacked hygiene items, and 40% lacked proper access to latrines. The 2013-2014 Lebanon Millennium Development Goals report indicated that many displaced Syrian families subsisted off of one cooked meal per day. Just 6% of displaced Syrian children aged 6–23 months eat the minimum sufficient diet according to UNICEF/WHO standards.

== Education ==
2012 VOA report about Syrian refugee children being enrolled in Lebanese schools

Minimal collaboration between the public, private, NGO, and iNGO sectors in Lebanon has resulted in the fragmented provision of quality education to Syrian refugee children. The overwhelmed public sector remains incapable of providing education during emergencies due to inflexible curriculums, limited capacity, and heavily regulated teaching. As a result, most Syrian students are absorbed into the private sector for primary education, and the informal sector for supplemental education. The percentage of Syrian students enrolled in public schools continues to drop due to the perception of poorer quality of education offered. The 2011–2012 schoolyear posed a significant dropout rate of 70% for Syrian refugee students given a lack of supplemental resources. The failure rate among Syrian children is twice the national average of that of Lebanese children.

=== Public schools ===
Syrian refugee children face many difficulties in Lebanese public schools, such as physical and verbal abuse from teaching staff and fellow peers. Although frequent abuse has been reported, much more abuse remains unreported for fear of loss of place at schools. Lack of remedial and language support also constitutes a great challenge for Syrian students. After seventh grade, Lebanese public schools teach science and math in English or French, creating a major barrier to the integration and retention of Arabic-speaking Syrian students in the Lebanese education system.

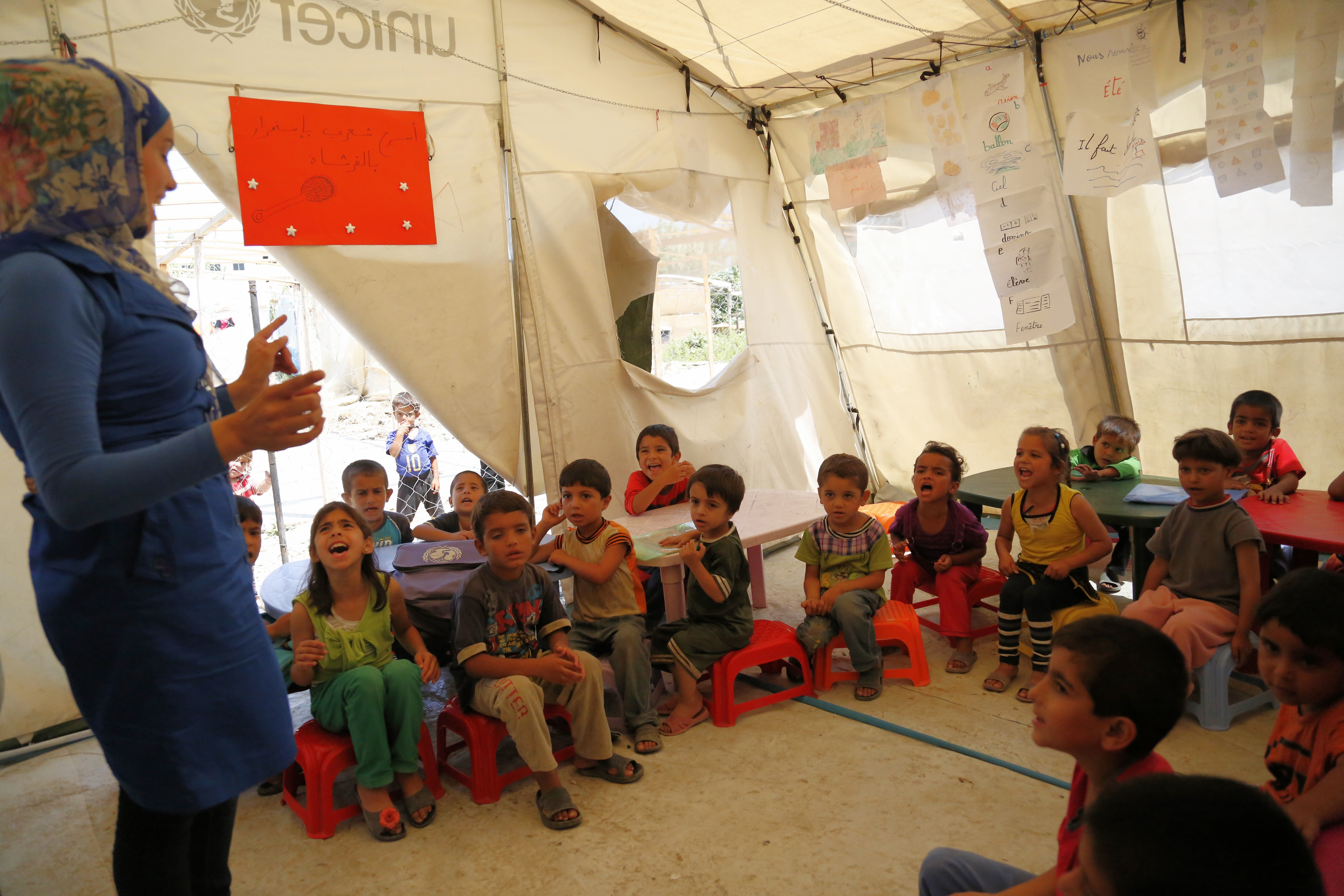
Syrian refugee children attend a lesson in a UNICEF temporary classroom in northern Lebanon (July 2014)

Currently in the Lebanese public school system, the number of Syrian school-aged children is greater than the number of Lebanese children. During the 2013–2014 schoolyear, there were approximately 58,000 Syrian children in Lebanese classrooms, and 30,000 Syrian children in Syrian-only second shifts in the afternoon. As of mid-2015, more than half of the students registered in Lebanese schools were Syrian.

A 2014 International Labor Organization report indicated that the gross enrollment rate of Syrian refugees was around 55% for primary education (6–10 years), but as low as 13% for secondary education (11–15 years). During secondary education, boys are more likely than girls to drop out of school and start working.

=== Evaluation ===
There are several advantages and risks posed by separate education systems for Syrian refugee children. Such a system facilitates Syrian children's adaptation to a new curriculum, as well as preserves their Syrian identity. Further, Arabic language proficiency in schools facilitate students' abilities to learn new material, and serves them in their eventual return to Syria. However, separated school systems can exacerbate tensions between Syrians and Lebanese nationals by creating a perception of lower-quality education for Syrian children, as well as strengthening religious, ethnic, and national divisions.

== Healthcare ==
Syrian refugees largely depend on international agencies and their nongovernmental partners for healthcare, in the absence and inability of the Lebanese health system to provide adequate healthcare. Health services in Lebanon have become increasingly inaccessible to refugee populations because of the high costs incurred for treatment in a largely privatized healthcare system. Furthermore, Syrian doctors in Lebanon are not allowed to treat refugee populations because of outstanding laws that protect the livelihood of local health professionals.

In addition to treating Syrian refugees, the Lebanese healthcare system is also responsible for covering vulnerable Lebanese groups (living on less than US$2.4/day), Lebanese returnees from Syria, Palestinian refugees from Syria, and Palestinian refugees in Lebanon. Each social group of the population has access to different services contingent upon its level of social protection. As a result, the Lebanese healthcare system is overburdened, fractured, and inefficient.

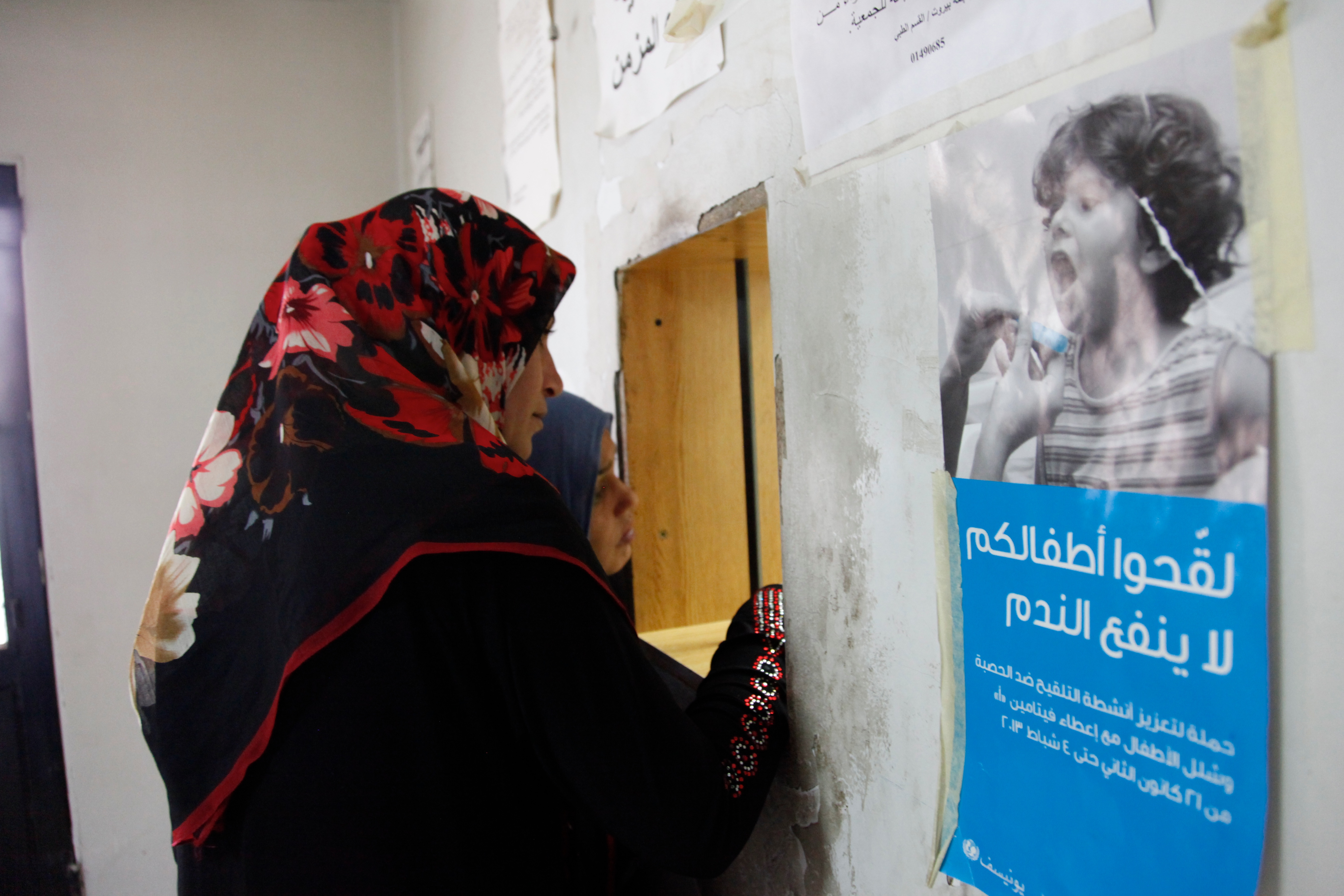
Two Syrian women wait to collect a prescription at a health clinic in Lebanon's Beqaa Valley

=== UNHCR ===
The UNHCR's public health approach in Lebanon prioritizes affordable and accessible primary health and emergency care with the aim of ensuring coverage for the greatest number of refugees in Lebanon. Syrian refugees registered with the UNHCR in Lebanon between the ages of five and sixty can access healthcare in centers managed by UNHCR's NGO partners for a fee of LP 3,000 to LP 5,000 per consultation (approx. US$2–$3).

The United Nations covers 75% of the cost of emergency care for registered refugees, but the remaining 25% must be covered by refugees themselves, unless they meet UNHCR's vulnerability criteria or are victims of torture, sexual violence, or gender-based violence. In these cases, 100% of costs are covered by UNHCR. UNHCR expenditure reports estimate that the average out-of-cost per Syrian patient is around $1000. In order to enforce payment of the remaining 25% of care from refugees, Lebanese hospitals have resorted to aggressive methods such as withholding corpses and newborns or confiscating personal IDs.

A 2014 UNHCR survey report found that 24% of Syrian refugees registered with UNHCR in Lebanon had returned to Syria, and 11% had returned to obtain medical care despite risks of ongoing violent conflict.

=== Health conditions ===
According to the Amel Association's 2013 assessment of 90,000 displaced Syrian patients, 47% suffered from skin diseases, 27% from digestive system diseases, 19% from respiratory diseases, 7% from malnutrition, and 2% from infectious diseases. 13% of these patients were diagnosed with mental illness. Campaigns spearheaded by Lebanon's Ministry of Public Health, UNICEF, and the WHO organized routine immunizations and vaccinations of Syrian refugees across the country, especially for salient diseases such as polio, measles, and cholera.

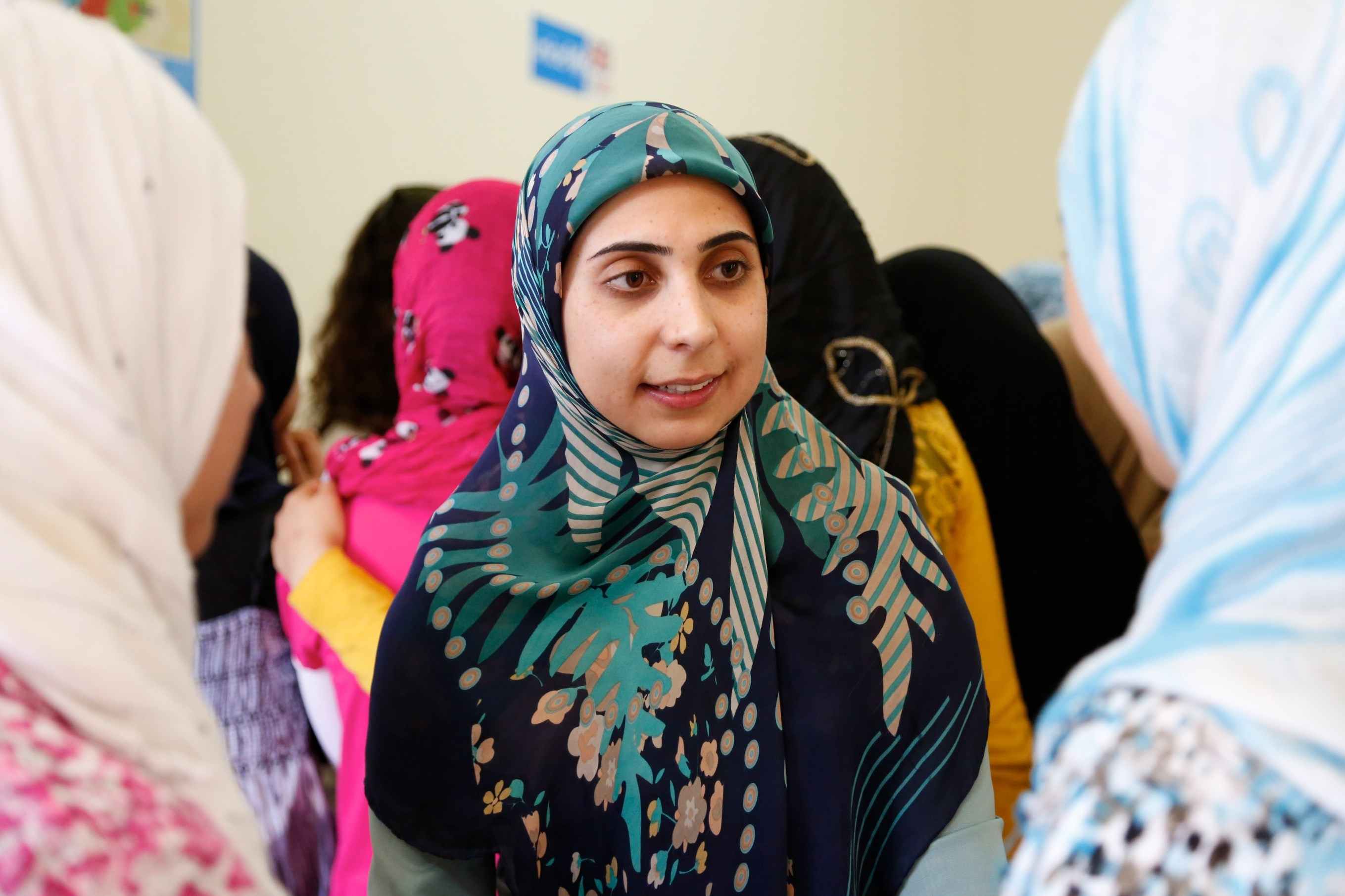
A Lebanese woman talks to two Syrian refugee girls at an information session about gender-based violence and early marriage in southern Lebanon

==== Women's health ====
Syrian refugee women's sexual and reproductive health has also been significantly affected by the lack of equitable, affordable health coverage in Lebanon. Such problems include a lack of access to emergency obstetric care, limited access to contraception, and forced cesarean sections. An increase in gender-based violence, especially intimate partner violence, early marriage, and sexual assault, has also significantly impacted Syrian refugee women's health and has resulted in fewer antenatal care visits, delayed family planning, and poorer reproductive health.

Syrian refugee women and girls, in desperation to earn money or goods to afford cost of living in Lebanon, may also engage in a form of prostitution termed 'survival sex'. Others may be forced into the sex industry as a means to pay back smugglers. The exploitation of refugee women and girls in the sex industry holds serious short- and long-term physical and mental health consequences, including increased risk of experiencing gender-based violence.

==== Mental health ====
Efforts to meet Syrian refugees' psychological needs in Lebanon has come under particular scrutiny. The Mental Health and Psychosocial Support (MHPSS) task force was established after UNHCR's December 2013 report addressing Syrian refugees' psychosocial needs in Lebanon. The task force, which aimed to coordinate services provided by different agencies and organizations, has been considered ineffective given the significantly high demand for psychosocial support among Syrian refugee populations.

== Barriers to Aid Access ==
Many factors like legal status, a lack of resources and poverty hinder Syrian refugees in Lebanon from accessing necessary aid to meet their basic needs. According to a 2019 Human Rights Watch World Report, 74% of the 1.5 million Syrian refugees residing in Lebanon do not have legal status. To avoid detainment, arrest, or deportation, illegal Syrian refugees limit their movements as much as possible. Out of fear of prosecution for their legal status, refugees' access to vital aid and services becomes more limited.

A study assessing the impacts of the Syrian refugee crisis on Lebanon found that the large influx of Syrian refugees into the country strained infrastructure including electricity, water, sanitation, municipal services, transportation and schools. A Lebanon Humanitarian Fund report determined that the strain on infrastructure increases poverty and tensions between communities and heightens socioeconomic inequalities. Due to the resource strain, the Lebanese Ministry of Education is unable to meet the needs of the 488,000-school aged Syrian refugee children in Lebanon, causing half of them to remain out of school. Food assistance provision was also determined to be insufficient, with 91% of Syrian refugees experiencing some degree of food insecurity in 2017. Inadequate access to healthcare services is also predicted to cause higher mortality rates within the Syrian refugee population.

Nine out of ten Syrian refugee families currently live under the poverty line, making it difficult to access necessary services. A Human Rights Watch report determined that severe economic strain makes school enrollment difficult for Syrian refugee families because of the necessary enrollment fees, transportation costs and school supply costs. According to the International Labour Organization for Arab States, poverty leads Syrian refugee children to work dangerous jobs to support their families instead of attending school, subjecting them to labor exploitation.

A 2016 RAND Corporation research report on the Syrian refugee crisis in Lebanon found that aside from illegal status, poverty and resource scarcity, the lack of information on aid resources is what prevents refugees from accessing necessary resources. The lack of access to aid resources is attributed to an information gap in understanding what resources are available and under what conditions one can or cannot be eligible for aid. Additionally, Syrian refugees in Lebanon reportedly perceived aid provision as "random, unfair, corrupt, unequal, insufficient, or unresponsive".

== Response to the refugee crisis ==
=== Government response ===
The Lebanese government's response to the Syrian refugee crisis has been largely shaped by the long-term presence of Palestinian refugees in Lebanon. Following the aftermath of the Palestine War in 1948, Lebanon welcomed Palestinian refugees in the expectation that their presence would be temporary. In response to the continual settlement of Palestinian refugees in Lebanon nearly seven decades later, Lebanon decided not to grant citizenship to Syrian refugees in order to protect its own fragile sectarian balance. The influx of Syrian refugees, mostly Sunni Muslims, has increased the demographic weight of Sunnis in Lebanon. Currently, Sunnis are the third largest confessional group in Lebanon; as political power in Lebanon is distributed on a confessional basis, the demographic shift holds significant implications for Lebanese politics.

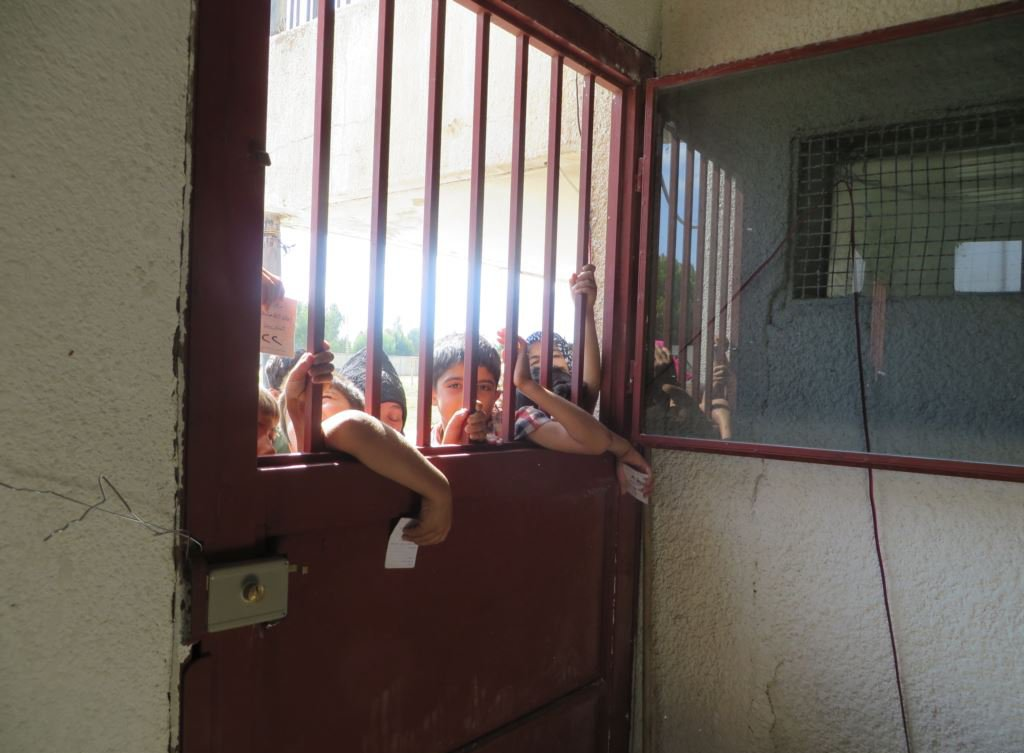
Children wait with slips of paper entitling them to collect bread for their families in the Beqaa Valley (September 2013)

The governmental deadlock created by the failure to elect a new president, as well as tension between Sunni and Shia Lebanese communities with regards to the fragile sectarian violence, resulted in the Lebanese government's "semi-laissez faire" policy towards Syrian refugees as they entered the country unabated. Despite praise from human rights organizations and the UNHCR for its open border policy, the Lebanese government officially decided to remain neutral with regards to the Syrian conflict due to pro- and anti-Assad members in its government. Consequently, international organizations such as the UNHCR took primary responsibility for dealing with Syrian refugees.

The Lebanese government attempted to control the influx of Syrian refugees into the country after the number of refugees reached 1,000,000 in 2014. In October 2014, refugees' access to territory in Lebanon was diminished and their return to Syria was officially encouraged by policies introduced by the Council of Ministers. The government also imposed a visa requirement for Syrian refugees arriving to Lebanon, as well as new procedures for renewing residency permits. Shortly thereafter, the government declared it would take the lead role in dealing with the Syrian refugee crisis amidst claims that the UNHCR infringed upon its sovereignty. By March 2015, the number of registered refugees in the country had reached 1,200,000; on 6 May 2015, the government suspended official registration mechanisms to reduce the official number of refugees in the country.

The Lebanese government issued the Lebanon Crisis Response Plan (LCRP) in 2015 (which was modified and reissued in 2017) in coordination with the UNHCR. The LCRP formed part of the Regional Refugee and Resilience Plan (3RP) that detailed response to the refugee crisis in the Levant, Turkey, Iraq, and Egypt. Notably, the LCRP reaffirmed that because Lebanon had not ratified the 1951 Convention Relating to the Status of Refugees or its 1967 Protocol, it could not officially be considered a country of asylum.

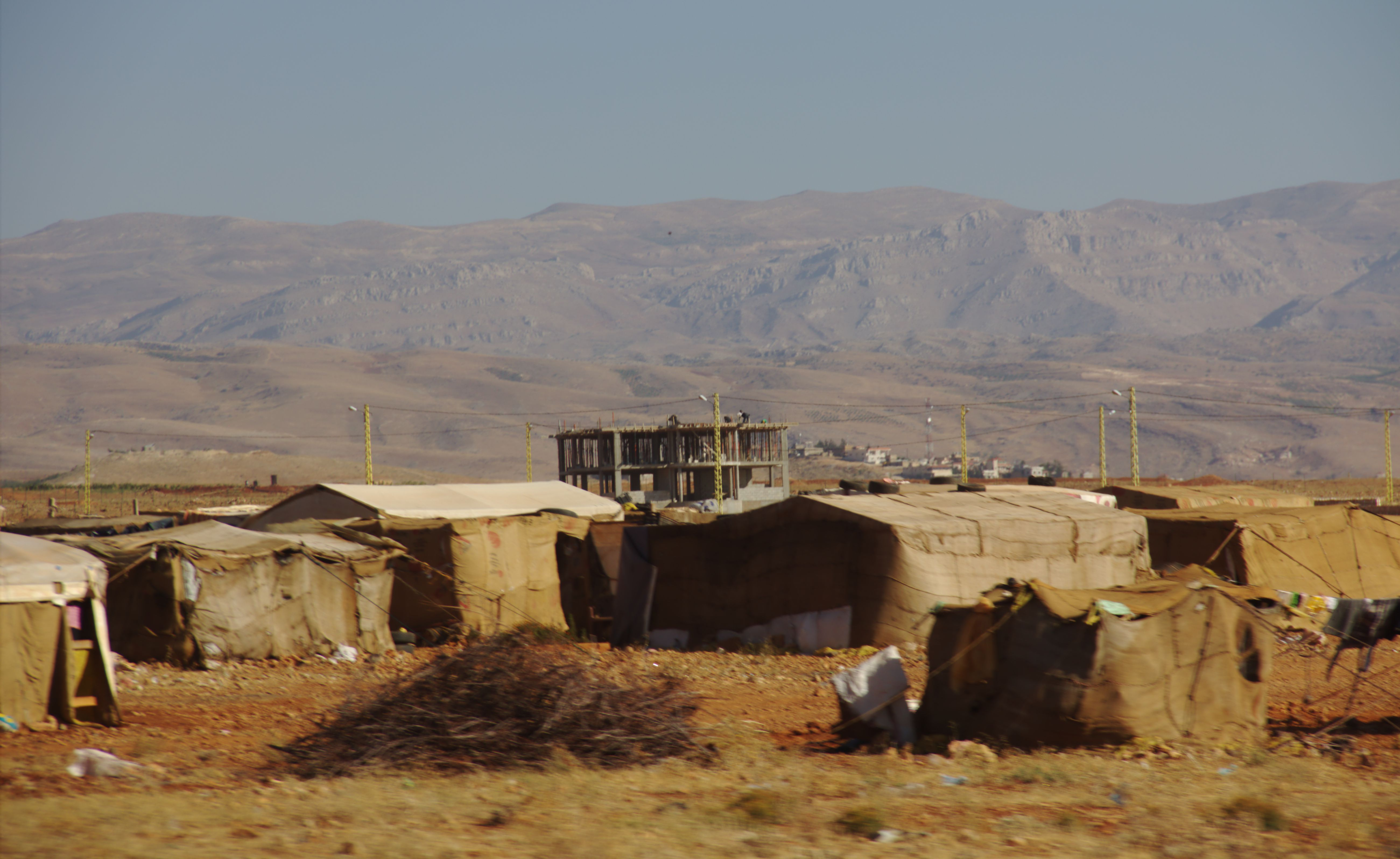
Refugee camp in Northern Lebanon, near the Syrian border (August 2012)

=== Public opinion ===
Resentment among the general Lebanese public toward Syrian refugees is exacerbated by rising prices and unemployment, as Lebanese families are paying directly for the Syrian crisis. This holds particularly salient in communities in the Beqaa Valley and the north of the country, which historically were economically marginalized and underdeveloped with respect to social services and infrastructure. A 2013 poll in Lebanon found that 52% of respondents believed that Syrian refugees threatened national security and stability, and 90% of respondents believed that the Syrian conflict hindered the Lebanese government's ability to protect its citizens.

=== Recruitment into armed groups ===
Militants are often mixed in with refugee flows into Lebanon near the Lebanon-Syria border. As such, there have been reports of militant groups recruiting fighters from Lebanon's refugee populations.

Some Syrian refugee camps in Lebanon have served as bases for jihadist groups fighting in Syria. Between 2014 and 2015, Sunni jihadists affiliated with Jabhat al-Nusra (now Hayat Tahrir al-Sham) reportedly attacked Shi'a Lebanese groups on several occasions. Further, ISIS was believed to be recruiting Syrian youth in Lebanon, taking advantage of their anger and disillusionment.

On 19 and 25 September 2014, the Lebanese army raided several refugee camps and arrested refugees for alleged acts of terrorism.

== See also ==
- Syrian Civil War
- Refugees of the Syrian Civil War
- Syrians in Lebanon
- Palestinians in Lebanon
- Human rights in Lebanon
