= Refugees of the Syrian civil war in Egypt =

Human toll of the Syrian civil war
- Pre-war population 22 ±.5; Internally displaced 6 ±.5, Refugees 5.5 ±.5, Fatalities 0.5 ±.1 (millions)

Syrian refugees
- By country: Turkey, Lebanon, Egypt, Jordan
- Settlements: Camps: Jordan

Internally displaced Syrians

Casualties of the war
- Crimes: War crimes, massacres, rape

Refugees of the Syrian civil war in Egypt refers to Syrian nationals who have fled the Syrian civil war and reside in Egypt. Egypt, which does not border Syria, became a major destination for Syrian refugees since 2012 following the election of Egyptian president Mohamed Morsi, who was a critic of Syrian president Bashar al-Assad. By March 2025, there were almost 140,000 registered Syrian refugees living in Egypt, making Syrians the second-largest refugee population in Egypt after Sudanese refugees. However, the Egyptian government estimates that about 1.5 million Syrian citizens live in Egypt, although the figure is uncertain.

The country is also under the Regional Refugee and Resilience Plan (3RP), a coordination effort between countries neighboring Syria (Jordan, Lebanon, Turkey, Iraq), Egypt, and UN agencies with NGOs including UNHCR and 240 partners.

== History ==
After the outbreak of the Syrian revolution in March 2011, Egypt allowed Syrians to enter without prior visas or additional security clearance, and many were able to reside in the country on short-term tourist permits without registering through the UNHCR asylum process. In July 2013, after Mohamed Morsi was removed from office and Adly Mansour became interim president, Egypt introduced new entry restrictions for Syrians, requiring prior visas and security approval, with exemptions for Syrians holding residency in certain foreign countries. This was a significant departure from the previous entry rules. The security approval process then became more extensive, but the visas issued through it allowed only temporary entry, not residency rights.

From late 2013, many Syrians encountered increasing difficulty when trying to enter Egypt. The changes in entry policy disrupted family reunification, limited access to asylum in Egypt, and created obstacles for Syrian students seeking to study in Egypt. Some Syrians instead entered from Sudan through irregular desert routes, where they faced exploitation and abuse, and where dozens of deaths were documented. The loss of legal protections for Syrian citizens, regardless of UNHCR status, contributed to hostile media coverage and incitement against Syrians in Egypt. Human rights organisations documented harassment and targeting of Syrians.

There were forced deportations, denials of entry, and removals without due process or judicial review. Human Rights Watch (HRW) reported that Egypt forcibly deported Syrian refugees to Damascus in January 2013. In 2013 and 2014, HRW and Amnesty International also reported several threatened or planned deportations of Syrians, including refugees, migrants and asylum seekers.

== Refugee conditions in Egypt ==
=== Employment ===
Egypt has a large informal market and most Syrians work in it. There are cafés in this informal market where a majority of unregistered Syrians work. The majority of Syrian registered with UNHCR have a higher chance of receiving a job because they are in Egypt legally. It is not a simple task to gain employment because of Egypt's reservation on refugee access to the labor market in the 1951 refugee convention.

=== Housing ===
In Egypt, refugees are allowed to live in the cities unlike some of their neighboring countries. The majority of Syrians that registered with UNHCR have housing in Egypt because of their resettlement program. However, there are more barriers to entry in Egypt. There has been more detention as a means of housing and a holding ground before deportation.

== Education ==
=== Public schools ===
In 2012, Egypt granted Syrians access to the public school system and aid in registration. Education is free to Syrian Refugees but it does exclude post-graduate education. Students are required to have their passports and a copy of their transcript from Syria. If a student does not have their transcript they can take a placement exam to determine their level of education. Upon application for school Syrian students receive a document that gives them access to a one-year residency permit.

=== Refugee schools ===
There are Syrian learning centers in Egypt that differ from the public school system because they are accredited. These educational institutions are a source of jobs for Syrian teachers because they are not allowed to legally teach in the Egyptian public school system. These schools offer assistance with the Egyptian curriculum.

== Healthcare ==
Egypt with the help UNHCR and other NGOs mainstreamed healthcare for Syrian refugees and made their healthcare free. Mainstreaming effect refugees in urban areas like Cairo. There was standardization of the healthcare system and more transparency of the costs.

=== Services provided ===
- Birth registration and certificate issuing
- Issuing of health cards
- Premarital care
- Antenatal care
- Routine immunization
- Early detection of thyroxine hormone deficiency
- Infant feeding counseling and growth monitoring
- Management of childhood illness
- Adolescent care
- Medical examinations
- Medicine provisions
- Chronic illness treatment
- Dental services

== Egypt's legal reaction to Syrian immigration ==
In order to gain refugee status in Egypt it must be proved that the applicant has a well founded fear of persecution. After gaining refugee status, the refugee is given a UNHCR yellow card which gives them three year temporary residency permit. However, Egypt is having refugees renew their permits every six months.

=== Restrictions ===
In July 2013, the Egyptian government required Syrian refugees to have entry visas, residency documents, and work permit before they could enter the country. Since the implementation of this law, 3,058 refugees have been detained for attempting to depart illegally by sea. 75 female refugees from multiple countries, including Syria, are being detained in prison for allegedly having fake passports, being undocumented, and attempting to depart. There is a high unemployment rate among refugees, due to the 1982 Article 11 of the Ministry of Labor's Ministerial Resolution that required employers to prove that no Egyptian national was available for a job before a work permit was issued to a refugee.
