= List of diplomatic missions of Syria =

Map showing Syrian diplomatic missions Syria Embassy Consulate-General

This is a list of diplomatic missions of Syria, not including honorary consulates.

== Current missions ==
=== Africa ===
Host country	Host city	Mission	Concurrent accreditation	Ref.
Algeria	Algiers	Embassy		
Egypt	Cairo	Embassy	Multilateral Organizations: Arab League	
Libya	Tripoli	Embassy		
Mauritania	Nouakchott	Embassy		
Morocco	Rabat	Embassy		
Nigeria	Abuja	Embassy		
Senegal	Dakar	Embassy		
South Africa	Pretoria	Embassy	Countries: Mauritius	
Sudan	Khartoum	Embassy	Countries: Kenya	
Tanzania	Dar es Salaam	Embassy	Multilateral Organizations: United Nations; United Nations Environment Programme; United Nations Human Settlements Programme	
Tunisia	Tunis	Embassy		

=== Americas ===
Host country	Host city	Mission	Concurrent accreditation	Ref.
Argentina	Buenos Aires	Embassy	Countries: Paraguay; Uruguay	
Brazil	Brasília	Embassy		
Brazil	São Paulo	Consulate-General		
Chile	Santiago de Chile	Embassy	Countries: Ecuador; Peru	
Cuba	Havana	Embassy		
United States	Washington, D.C.	Embassy		
Venezuela	Caracas	Embassy	Countries: Colombia; Trinidad and Tobago	

=== Asia ===
Host country	Host city	Mission	Concurrent accreditation	Ref.
Armenia	Yerevan	Embassy		
Bahrain	Manama	Embassy		
China	Beijing	Embassy	Countries: Laos; Mongolia; Vietnam	
India	New Delhi	Embassy	Countries: Myanmar; Nepal; Sri Lanka; Bangladesh	
Indonesia	Jakarta	Embassy	Multilateral Organizations: Association of Southeast Asian Nations	
Iran	Tehran	Embassy		
Iraq	Baghdad	Embassy		
Japan	Tokyo	Embassy	Countries: South Korea	
Jordan	Amman	Embassy		
Kuwait	Kuwait City	Embassy		
Lebanon	Beirut	Embassy		
Malaysia	Kuala Lumpur	Embassy	Countries: Philippines; Singapore; Thailand	
North Korea	Pyongyang	Embassy		
Oman	Muscat	Embassy		
Pakistan	Islamabad	Embassy		
Qatar	Doha	Embassy		
Saudi Arabia	Riyadh	Embassy		
Saudi Arabia	Jeddah	Consulate-General		
United Arab Emirates	Abu Dhabi	Embassy		
United Arab Emirates	Dubai	Consulate-General		
Turkey	Ankara	Embassy		
Turkey	Gaziantep	Consulate-General		
Turkey	Istanbul	Consulate-General		

=== Europe ===
Host country	Host city	Mission	Concurrent accreditation	Ref.
Austria	Vienna	Embassy	Countries: Slovakia; Slovenia; Multilateral Organizations: United Nations	
Belarus	Minsk	Embassy	Countries: Estonia; Latvia; Lithuania	
Belgium	Brussels	Embassy	Countries: Luxembourg; Netherlands; Multilateral Organizations: European Union	
Bulgaria	Sofia	Embassy		
Cyprus	Nicosia	Embassy		
Czechia	Prague	Embassy		
France	Paris	Embassy	Countries: Portugal; Switzerland	
Germany	Berlin	Embassy		
Germany	Bonn	Consulate-General		
Greece	Athens	Embassy	Countries: Albania	
Hungary	Budapest	Embassy		
Italy	Rome	Embassy	Multilateral Organizations: Food and Agriculture Organization; International Fund for Agricultural Development; World Food Programme	
Poland	Warsaw	Embassy		
Romania	Bucharest	Embassy	Countries: Moldova	
Russia	Moscow	Embassy	Countries: Kazakhstan; Kyrgyzstan; Tajikistan	
Spain	Madrid	Embassy		
Serbia	Belgrade	Embassy	Countries: Bosnia and Herzegovina; North Macedonia	
Sweden	Stockholm	Embassy	Countries: Denmark; Finland; Iceland; Norway	
Switzerland	Geneva	Consulate-General		
United Kingdom	London	Embassy	Countries: Ireland	

=== Multilateral organisations ===
Organization	Host city	Host country	Mission	Concurrent accreditation	Ref.
Organisation for the Prohibition of Chemical Weapons	The Hague	Netherlands	Permanent Representation		
United Nations	New York City	United States	Permanent Mission	Countries: Nicaragua	
United Nations	Geneva	Switzerland	Permanent Mission		
UNESCO	Paris	France	Permanent Mission	Countries: Holy See	

== Gallery ==
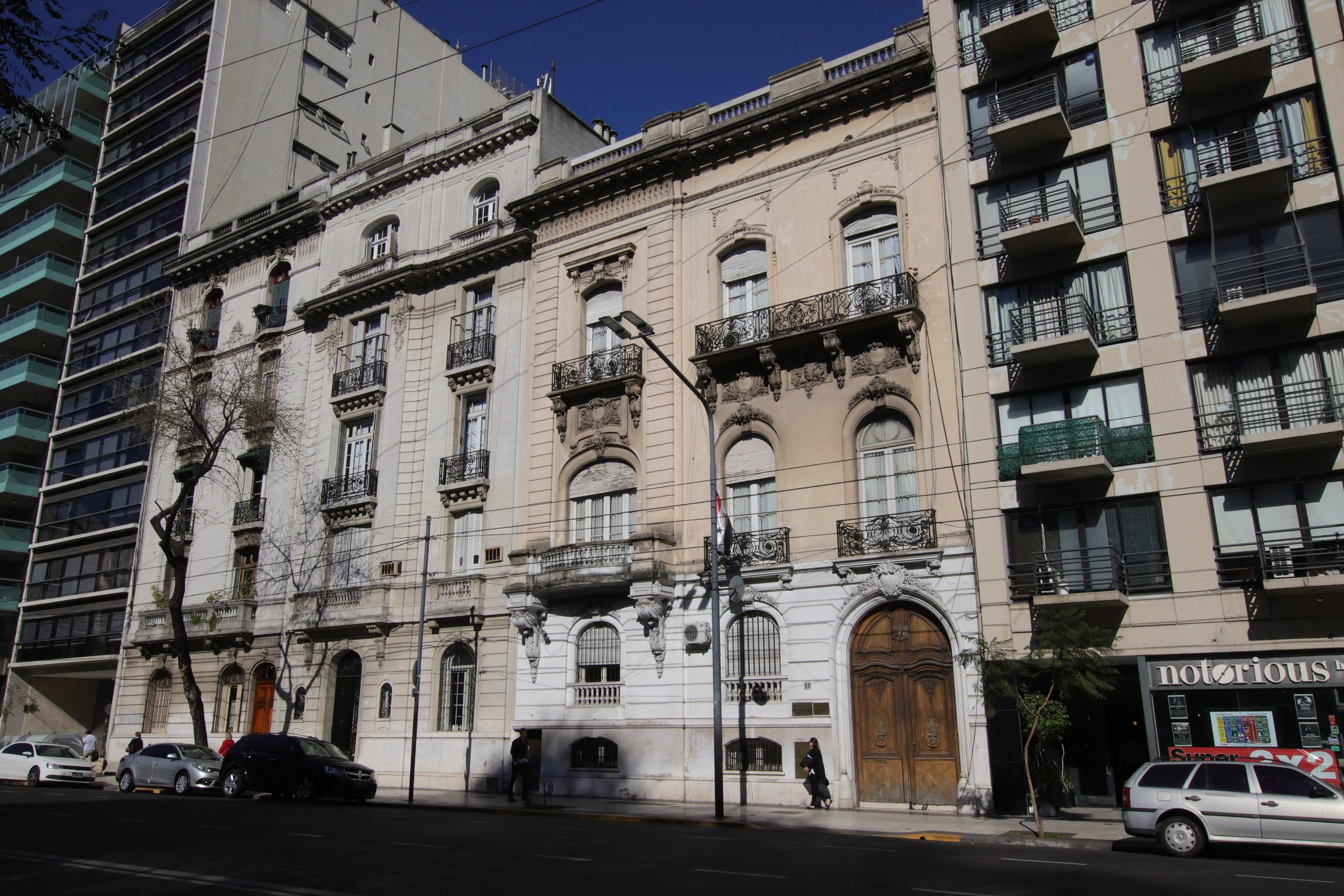
Embassy in Buenos Aires

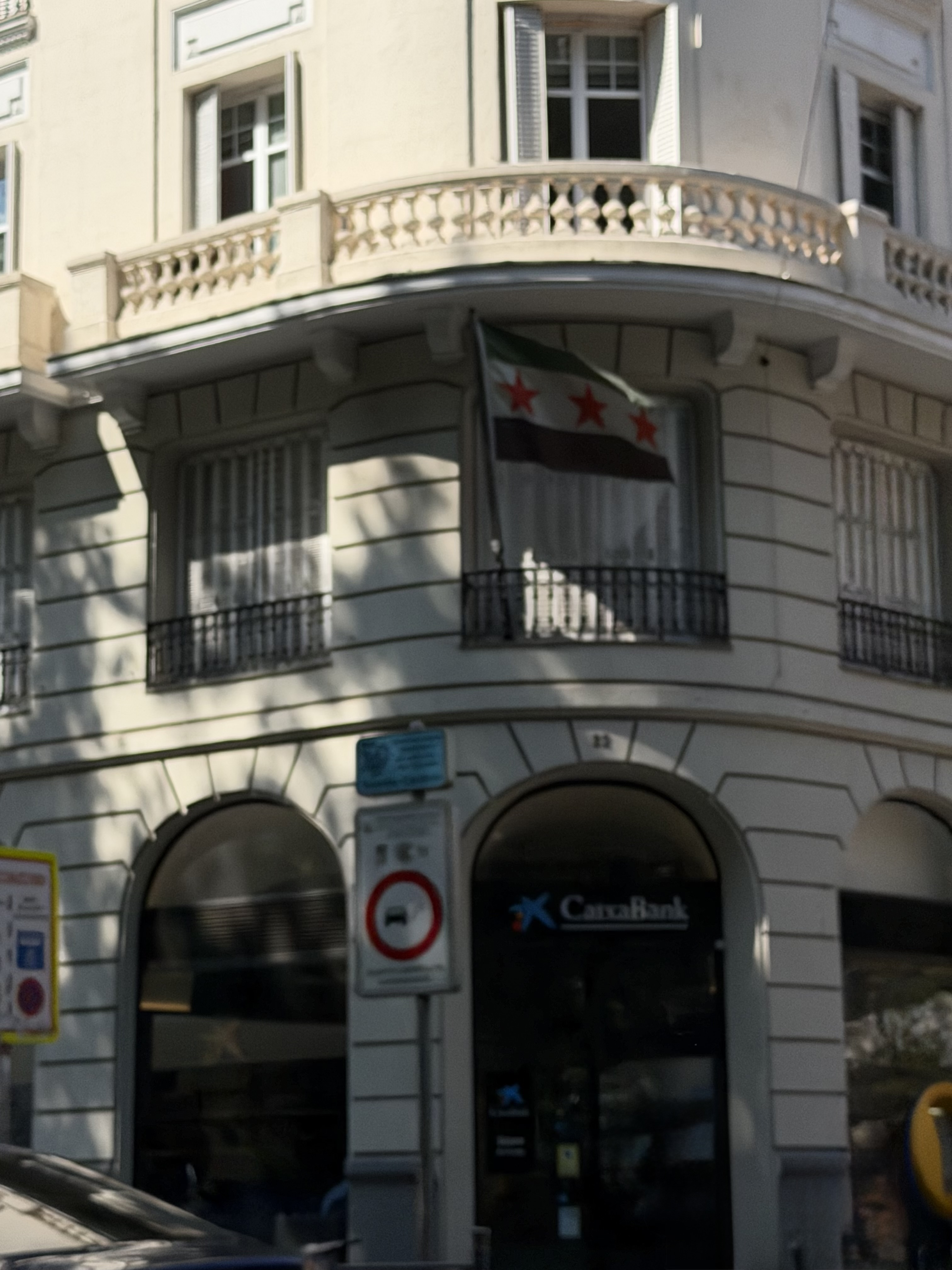
Embassy in Madrid

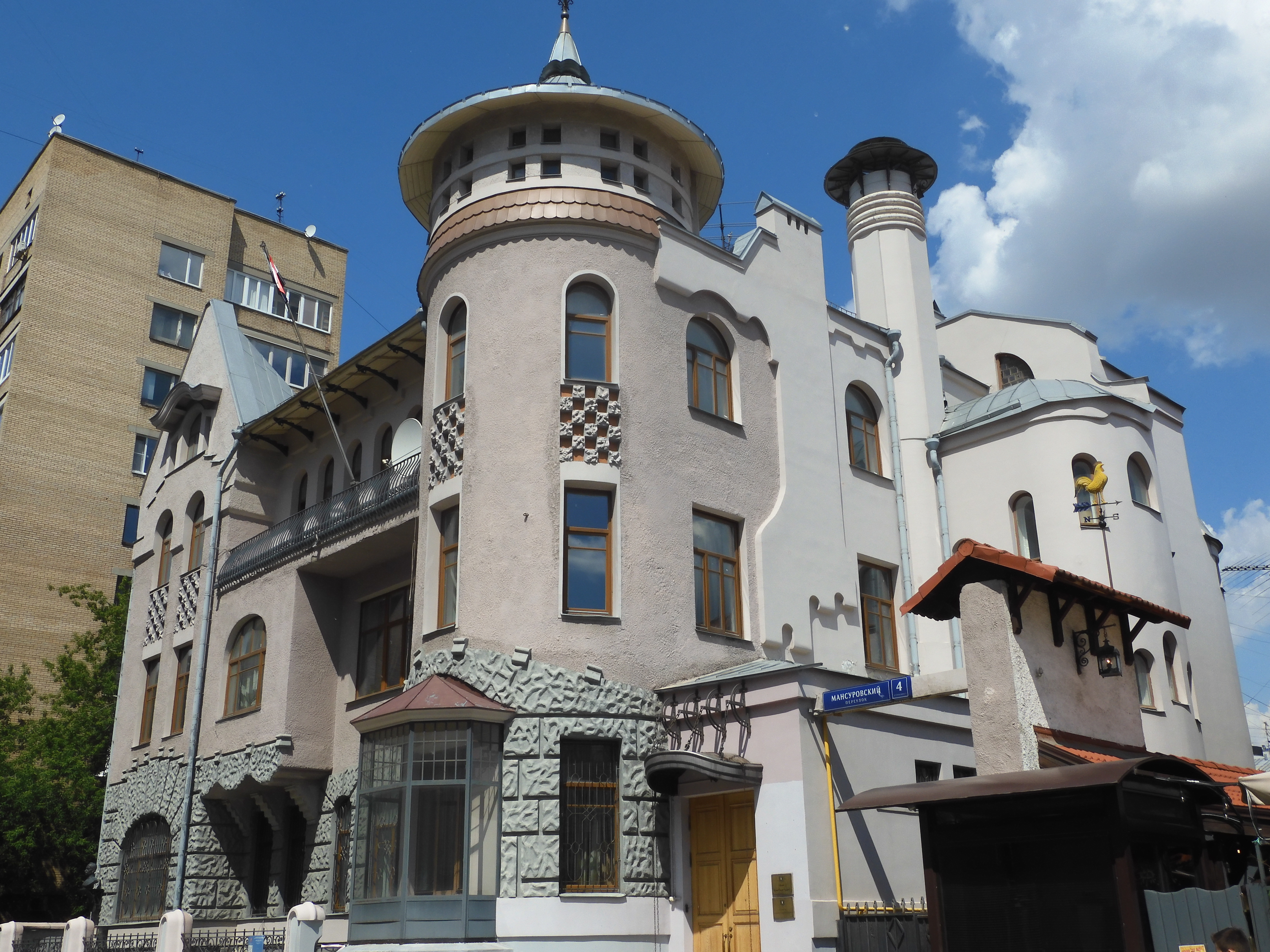
Embassy in Moscow

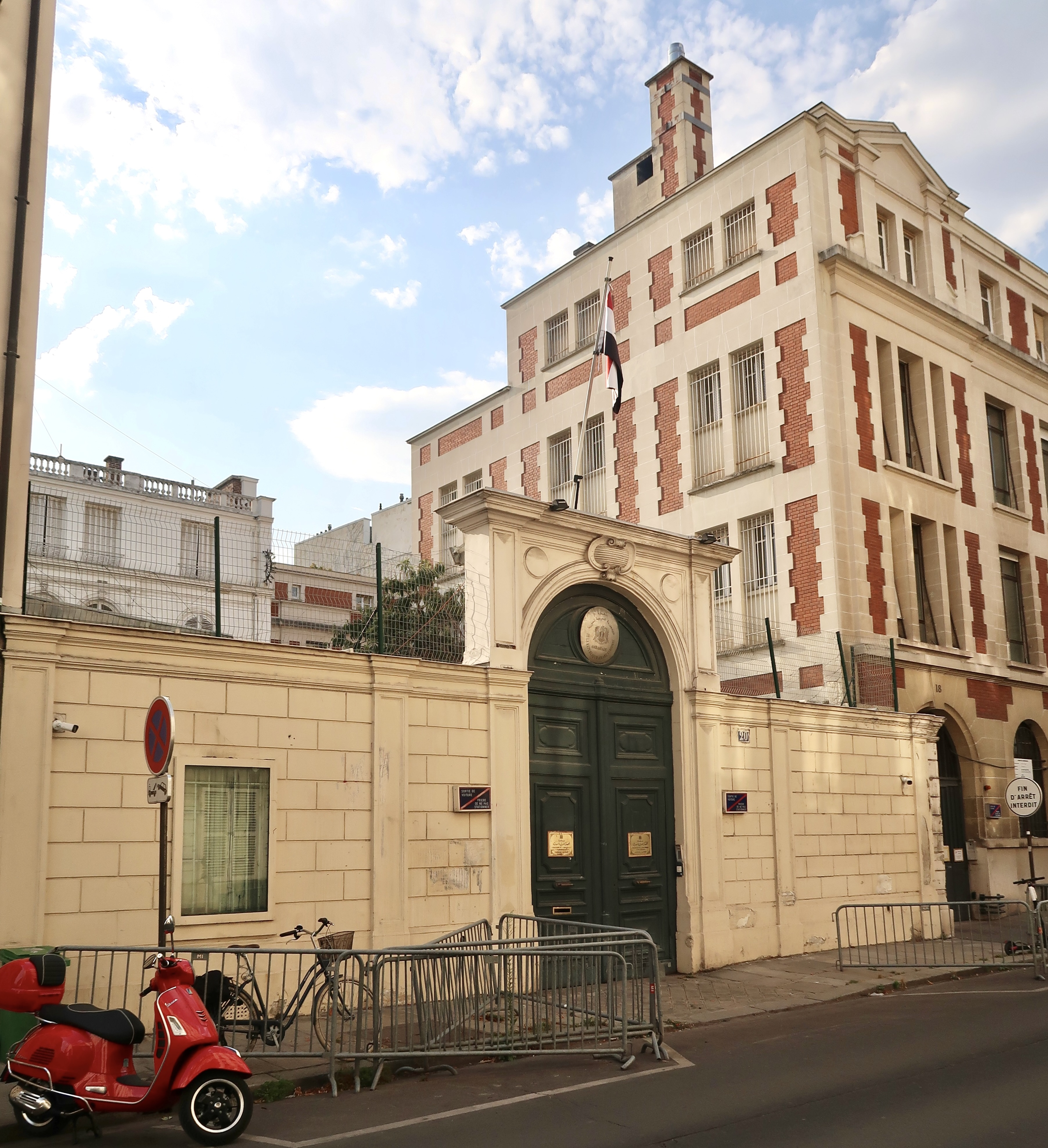
Embassy in Paris

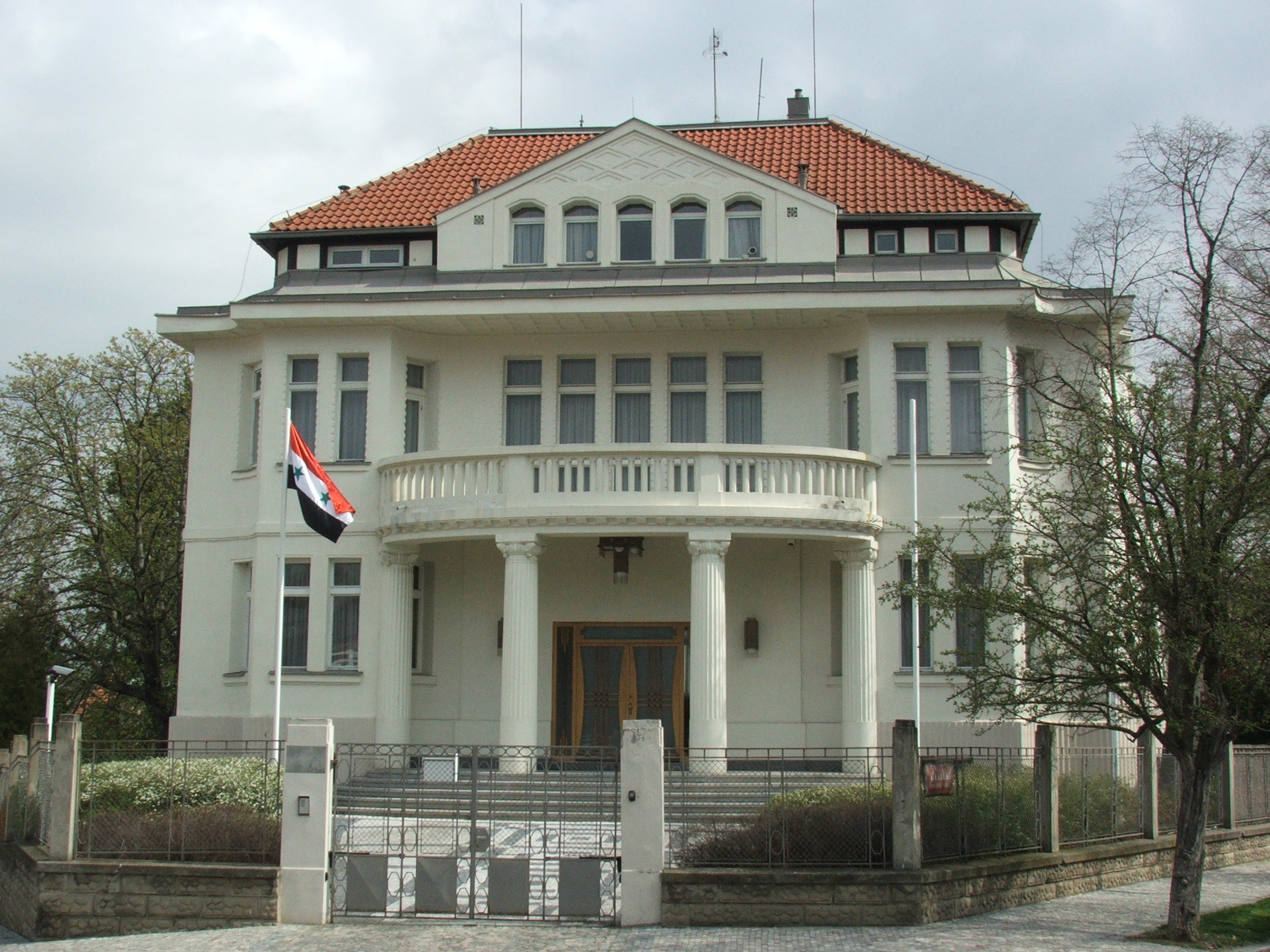
Embassy in Prague

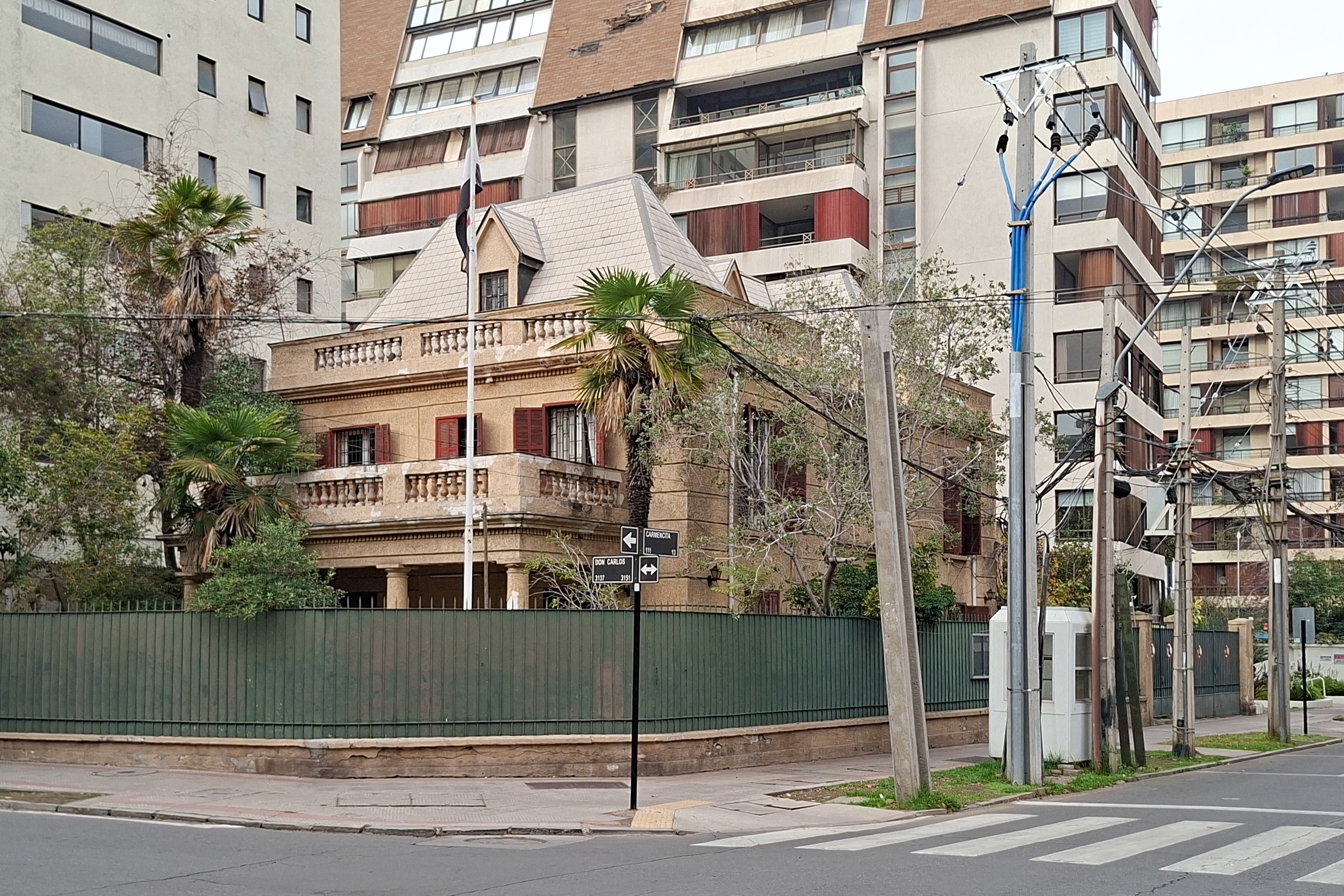
Embassy in Santiago

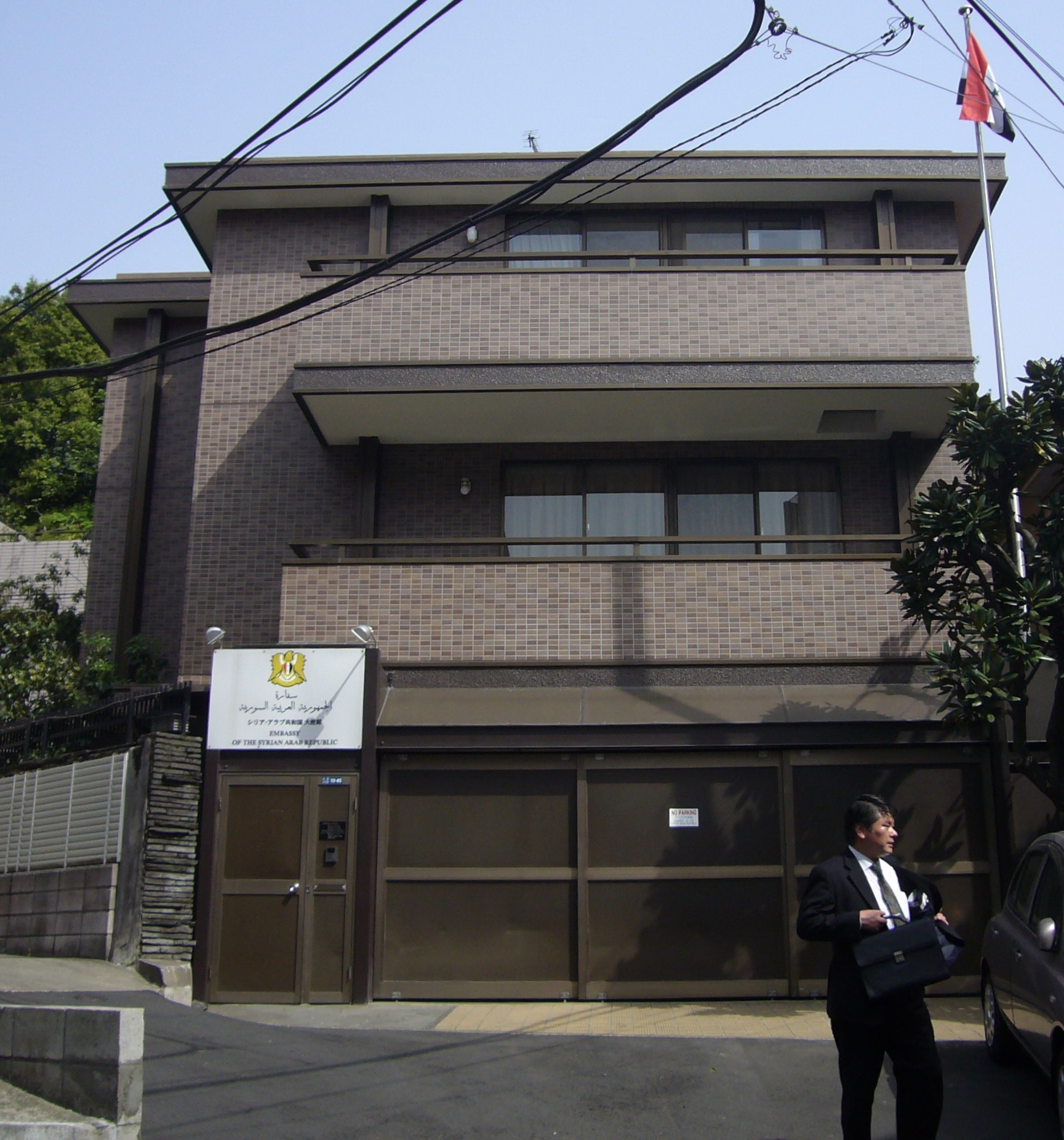
Embassy in Tokyo

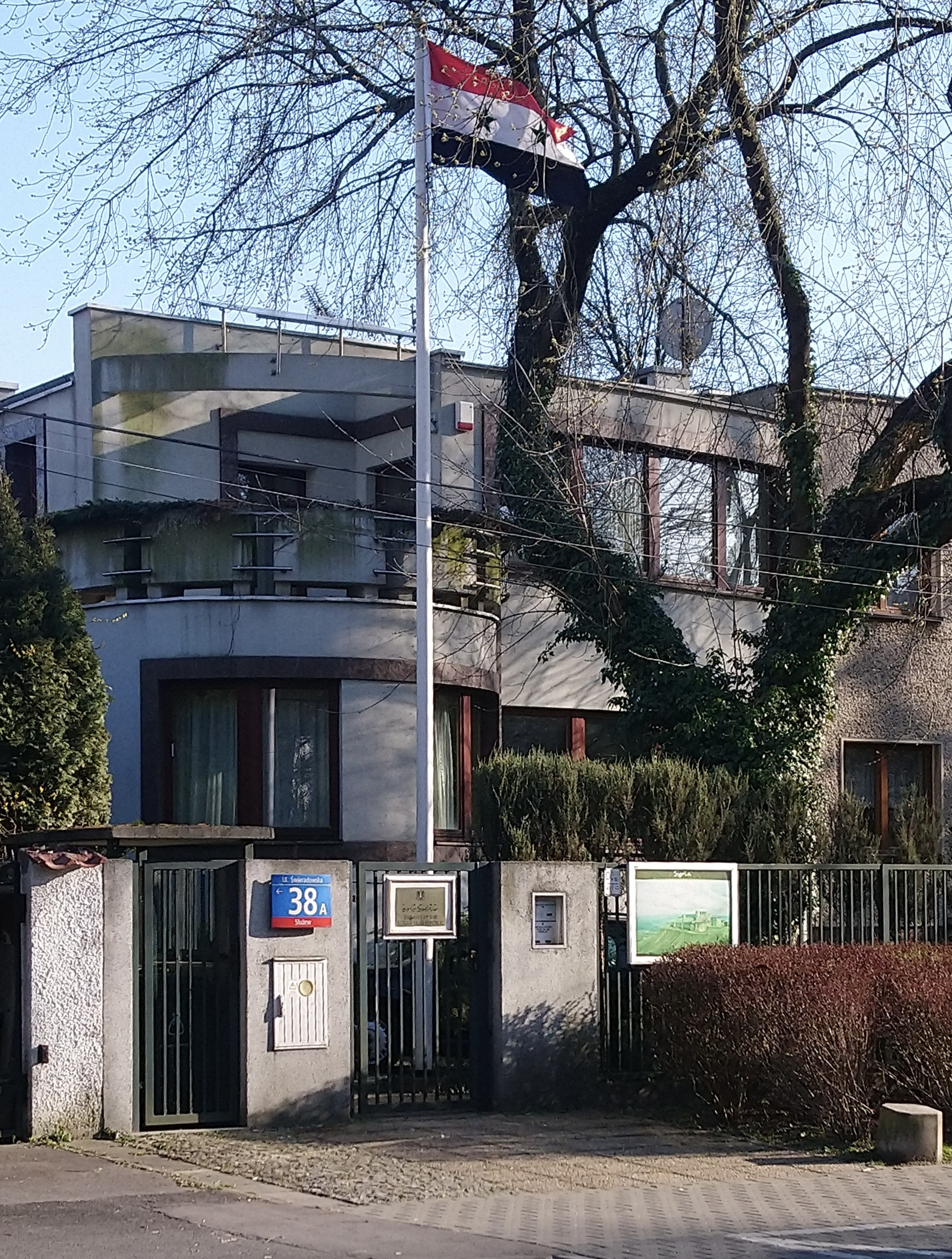
Embassy in Warsaw

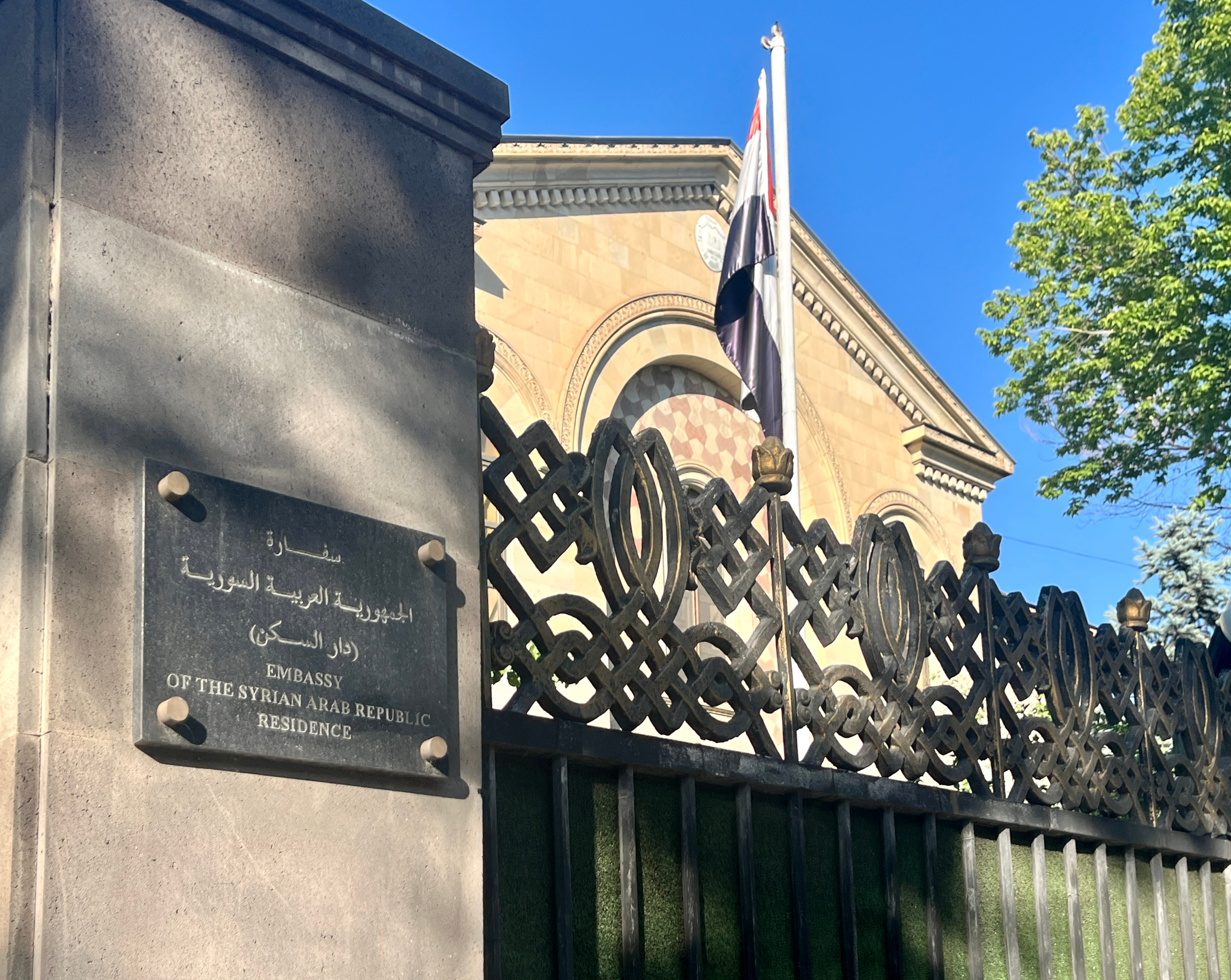
Embassy in Yerevan

== Closed missions ==
=== Americas ===
Host country	Host city	Mission	Year closed	Ref.
Canada	Ottawa	Embassy	2012	

=== Europe ===
Host country	Host city	Mission	Year closed	Ref.
Switzerland	Bern	Embassy	1968	
Ukraine	Kyiv	Embassy (Note: To be reopened.)	2018	

=== Oceania ===
Host country	Host city	Mission	Year closed	Ref.
Australia	Canberra	Embassy	2012	

== See also ==
- Foreign relations of Syria
- List of diplomatic missions in Syria
- Syrian passport
- Visa policy of Syria
