= Visa requirements for Syrian citizens =

Administrative entry restrictions

Syrian passport

Visa requirements for Syrian citizens are administrative entry restrictions by the authorities of other states placed on citizens of Syria.

As of 2026, Syrian citizens had visa-free or visa on arrival access to 26 countries and territories, ranking the Syrian passport 100th in the world (only above Afghanistan) according to the Henley Passport Index.

== Visa requirements map ==
Visa requirements for Syrian citizens holding ordinary passports Syria Visa not required Visa on arrival eVisa Visa available both on arrival or online Visa required Admission refused

== Visa requirements ==
Country	Visa requirement	Allowed stay	Notes (excluding departure fees)
Afghanistan	eVisa		Visa is not required in case born in Afghanistan or can proof that one of their parents is a national of Afghanistan or born in Afghanistan.; e-Visa : Visitors must arrive at Kabul International (KBL).
Albania	eVisa		Visa is not required for Holders of a valid multiple-entry Schengen, UK or US visa has been previously used once or residence permit of Schengen, UK, US or UAE 10 years.
Algeria	Visa required		
Andorra	Visa required		
Angola	Visa required		
Antigua and Barbuda	eVisa		
Argentina	Visa required		Eligible for Syria Program (Programa Siria). humanitarian visa.
Armenia	Visa required		
Australia	Online Visa required		
Austria	Visa required		
Azerbaijan	Visa required		
Bahamas	eVisa		
Bahrain	eVisa / Visa on arrival	14 days	Passengers with a resident permit issued by Saudi Arabia can obtain a visa on arrival for a maximum stay of 1 month if: the residence permit is at least 3 months old and valid for at least another 3 months when entering Bahrain; and; having a re-entry visa issued by the country of residency; and; having a hotel reservation confirmation; and; having a return/onward ticket for next destination and sufficient funds to cover their stay.; Passengers with a visa issued by Saudi Arabia, USA, United Arab Emirates, United Kingdom or a Schengen Member State can obtain a visa on arrival for a maximum stay of 1 month. They can apply to extend their stay for an additional 2 weeks.
Bangladesh	Visa required		
Barbados	Visa required		
Belarus	Visa required		
Belgium	Visa required		
Belize	Visa required		
Benin	eVisa	30 days	Must have an international vaccination certificate.
Bhutan	eVisa		
Bolivia	Online Visa	30 days	
Bosnia and Herzegovina	Visa required		
Botswana	eVisa	3 months	
Brazil	Visa required		
Brunei	Visa required		
Bulgaria	Visa required		
Burkina Faso	eVisa		
Burundi	Visa on arrival	1 month	
Cambodia	eVisa / Visa on arrival	30 days	
Cameroon	eVisa		
Canada	Visa required		
Cape Verde	Visa on arrival	3 months	
Central African Republic	Visa required		
Chad	Visa required		
Chile	Visa required		
China	Visa required		24-hour visa-free transit through any international airports of China (except Guangzhou and Ürümqi), allows domestic travel through different airports. (Note: Custom procedure for 24-hour visa-free transit is required in principle, except in Beijing (both Capital and Daxing), Shanghai Pudong, Hangzhou, Xiamen, Guangzhou, Shenzhen, Chengdu Tianfu and Xi'an if no leaving of international transit areas.)
Colombia	Online Visa		
Comoros	Visa on arrival	45 days	
Republic of the Congo	Visa required		
Democratic Republic of the Congo	eVisa	7 days	
Costa Rica	Visa required		
Côte d'Ivoire	eVisa	3 months	
Croatia	Visa required		
Cuba	Visa required		
Cyprus	Visa required		
Czech Republic	Visa required		
Denmark	Visa required		
Djibouti	eVisa	90 days	Visas are issued for stays of up to 1 month, 3 months or 6 months.
Dominica	Visa not required	21 days	
Dominican Republic	Visa required		
Ecuador	eVisa		
Egypt	Admission refused		Only Syrians holding a resident card for non-tourism purposes are allowed entry
El Salvador	Visa required		
Equatorial Guinea	eVisa		
Eritrea	Visa required		
Estonia	Visa required		
Eswatini	Visa required		
Ethiopia	Visa required		Credit card payment transactions are not accepted when applying for e-Visa.
Fiji	Visa required		
Finland	Visa required		
France	Visa required		
Gabon	eVisa	90 days	
Gambia	Visa required		
Georgia	Visa required		Visa Exemptions: Holders of valid visa or residence permit of: "Australia, Austria, Bahrain, Belgium, Bulgaria, Canada, Croatia, Cyprus, Czech Republic, Denmark, Estonia, Finland, France, Germany, Greece, Hungary, Iceland, Ireland, Italy, Japan, South Korea, Kuwait, Latvia, Lichtenstein, Lithuania, Luxembourg, Malta, Netherlands, New Zealand, Norway, Oman, Poland, Portugal, Qatar, Romania, Saudi Arabia, Slovakia, Slovenia, Spain, Sweden, Switzerland, UAE, UK, USA." are exempted from visa. You can enter Georgia without a visa for 90 days in any 180-day period. Please, note that you must present relevant valid visa or residence permit along with your travel document/passport at arrival.: Additional Information: Nationals of Syria must have health insurance.; Visitors not holding return/onward tickets could be refused entry.; Passengers with Arabic residence permit must have an official English translation of the residence permit.
Germany	Visa required		
Ghana	Visa required		
Greece	Visa required		
Grenada	Visa required		
Guatemala	Visa required		
Guinea	eVisa	90 days	
Guinea-Bissau	Visa on arrival	90 days	
Guyana	Visa required		
Haiti	Visa required		
Honduras	Visa required		
Hungary	Visa required		
Iceland	Visa required		
India	Visa required		
Indonesia	Visa required		
Iran	Visa not required	90 days	Visa not required if arriving directly from Damascus Airport only for 90 days every 180-day period.
Iraq	eVisa		
Ireland	Visa required		
Israel	Visa required		Confirmation from Israeli Foreign Ministry is required before a visa is issued.
Italy	Visa required		
Jamaica	Visa required		
Japan	Visa required		Eligible for an e-Visa if residing in one these countries Australia, Brazil, Cambodia, Canada, India, Saudi Arabia, Singapore, South Africa, Taiwan, United Arab Emirates, United Kingdom, United States.; May apply online
Jordan	Visa required		A Syrian visitor of the following categories does not need prior approval (entry visa) and can come to the Kingdom directly: Those who have never visited Jordan and who have residency for a period of not less than 6 months in one of the following countries (Gulf Cooperation Council countries, European countries, North American countries, South American countries, Canada, Australia, Japan, South Korea) - Those who have previously been in Jordan on a regular basis and left Jordan on a regular basis and on the Syrian passport with which they entered Jordan and who have residency for a period of not less than 4 months in one of the following countries (Gulf Cooperation Council countries, European countries, North American countries, South American countries, Canada, Australia, Japan, South Korea) - Those who have not been issued a deportation decision and who have residency in one of the following countries (Gulf Cooperation Council countries, the United States of America, Canada, Australia, Japan, South Korea - Investors who hold investor cards (A, B) issued by the Ministry of Investment, and their family members who hold investor family cards - Investors in the Jordanian free zones who hold an investor card from the Jordanian free zones and the family members who hold an investor family card - Children and husbands of Jordanian women and wives of Jordanians - Owners of companies and investing partners, and the amount of the partnership share is 50,000 Jordanian Dinars or more, and their family members (husband / wife / son / daughter), provided that the son/daughter is not married
Kazakhstan	Visa required		
Kenya	Electronic Travel Authorisation	90 days	Applications can be submitted up to 90 days prior to travel and must be submitted at least 3 days in advance.; eTA fee is 32.50 USD.; Proof of reservation at the hotel where visitors plan to stay is required (if staying with friends, an invitation letter is also acceptable).; Yellow fever vaccination certificate is required if coming from endemic countries.
Kiribati	Visa required		
North Korea	Visa required		
South Korea	Visa required		Multiple-Entry Visa may be granted to who entered South Korea 4 or more times within the last 2 years, or 10 or more visits in total (one of those 10 visits should be within the last 2 years).; May apply online
Kuwait	Visa required		e-Visa can be obtained for holders of a Residence Permit issued by a GCC member state under the following conditions: To be 18 years old and over.; The residence permit for a GCC state must be valid for at least another 3 months.; To be accompanied by the sponsor of the residence permit if the sponsor is an individual.; Does not apply to holders of a GCC Student Visa and Non-Skilled Worker Vis
Kyrgyzstan	eVisa	60 days	
Laos	Visa required		
Latvia	Visa required		
Lebanon	Visa on arrival (conditional)		Visa Issuance: Passengers with a residence permit issued by a GCC Member State on which the profession of businessmen, managers, company owners, doctors, engineers and lawyers is stated, can obtain a visa on arrival at Beirut (BEY) for a period not exceeding the validity of their passport.; Nationals of Syria passing through Lebanon on their way to Syria can obtain a visa on arrival at Beirut (BEY) for maximum stay of 48 hours.; Nationals of Syria traveling as tourists can obtain a visa on arrival at Beirut (BEY) for the duration of the pre-arranged accommodation if they have: USD 1,000.- or equivalent; and; a proof of accommodation during their stay; and; a return/onward ticket.; Nationals of Syria traveling on business can obtain a visa on arrival at Beirut (BEY) for maximum stay of 1 month. They must have: a proof of business/occupation; and; a letter of invitation/guarantee issued by the inviting party.; Spouses and children of Lebanese nationals can obtain a visa on arrival at Beirut (BEY) for a maximum stay of 6 months. They must have an official marriage certificate, a family book or other valid proof of relationship.
Lesotho	eVisa	14 days	
Liberia	eVisa		
Libya	Admission refused		
Liechtenstein	Visa required		
Lithuania	Visa required		
Luxembourg	Visa required		
Madagascar	eVisa / Visa on arrival	60 days	
Malawi	eVisa	90 days	
Malaysia	Visa not required	90 days	
Maldives	Free visa on arrival	30 days	
Mali	Admission refused		
Malta	Visa required		
Marshall Islands	Visa required		
Mauritania	Visa required		
Mauritius	Visa required		
Mexico	Visa required		Visa is not required for Holders of a valid visa of Canada, US, UK or a Schengen State and Permanent residence of Canada, Chile, Colombia, Schengen State, Japan, UK, US; Entry may be refused by immigration officials for individuals who were previously denied a US visa, even if holding a valid Mexican visa.
Micronesia	Visa not required	30 days	
Moldova	Visa required		Citizens holding a residence permit or a valid visa issued by one of the member states of the European Union or one of the parties to the Schengen Agreement can apply for an electronic visa.
Monaco	Visa required		
Mongolia	Visa required		
Montenegro	Visa required		Visa not required for holders of a valid Australia, Japan, Canada, New Zealand, Ireland, US, UK or a Schengen Visa.; Holders of residence permit in the United Arab Emirates may enter, in Montenegro for a duration of 10 days
Morocco	Visa required		
Mozambique	eVisa / Visa on arrival	30 days	
Myanmar	Visa required		
Namibia	eVisa		
Nauru	Visa required		
Nepal	Visa required		
Netherlands	Visa required		
New Zealand	Visa required		Holders of an Australian Permanent Resident Visa or Resident Return Visa may be granted a New Zealand Resident Visa on arrival permitting indefinite stay (pursuant to the Trans-Tasman Travel Arrangement), subject to meeting character requirements and obtaining an Electronic Travel Authority prior to departure.
Nicaragua	Visa required		Visa on arrival if holding valid visa issued by United States, Canada, or Schengen Member State.
Niger	Visa required		
Nigeria	eVisa	90 days	
North Macedonia	Visa required		
Norway	Visa required		
Oman	Visa required		Passengers with a Visa Deposit Receipt can obtain a visa on arrival.; Residents of Saudi Arabia can obtain a visa on arrival for a maximum stay of 28 days.; Visa on arrival fee must be paid in local currency (OMR) or by credit card.
Pakistan	eVisa	3 months	Online Visa eligible.
Palau	Free visa on arrival	30 days	
Panama	Visa required		
Papua New Guinea	eVisa	60 days	Visitors may apply for a visa online under the "Tourist - Own Itinerary" category.
Paraguay	Visa required		
Peru	Visa required		
Philippines	Visa required		Residents of the United Arab Emirates may obtain an eVisa through the official Philippine eVisa website. A valid Emirati residence visa must be shown upon an eVisa application.
Poland	Visa required		
Portugal	Visa required		
Qatar	eVisa		Visitors may apply for a visa on the Hayya website.
Romania	Visa required		
Russia	Visa required		
Rwanda	eVisa / Visa on arrival	30 days	Nationals of Syria can obtain a visa on arrival for a maximum stay of 30 days. They can apply to extend their stay.
Saint Kitts and Nevis	evisa		
Saint Lucia	Visa required		
Saint Vincent and the Grenadines	Visa required		
Samoa	Visa not required	60 days	
San Marino	Visa required		
São Tomé and Príncipe	eVisa		
Saudi Arabia	Visa required		Tourist visa on arrival for holders of a valid multiple entry visa from US, UK or Schengen area, under the condition that the multiple entry visa has been used at least once, proving that by showing the entry and exit stamps of the country of issuance.
Senegal	Visa required		
Serbia	Visa required		
Seychelles	Electronic Border System	3 months	Application can be submitted up to 30 days before travel.; Visitors must upload a reservation confirmation(s) for each visitor's location of stay in Seychelles.; Yellow fever vaccination certificate is required if coming from endemic countries.; Payment of the fee (EUR 10) by credit or debit card.; Valid for one journey only and it expires once exit the country.
Sierra Leone	eVisa	3 months	
Singapore	eVisa		
Slovakia	Visa required		
Slovenia	Visa required		
Solomon Islands	Visa required		
Somalia	eVisa	30 days	
South Africa	Electronic travel authorization		
South Sudan	eVisa		Obtainable online.; Printed visa authorization must be presented at the time of travel.
Spain	Visa required		
Sri Lanka	Visa required		Below are the documents required: Police Clearance report; If the applicant is coming from another country after staying for more than 6 months, are required to provide Police clearance from that country and copy of the Visa; Certificate from a Sri Lankan guarantor & a photocopy of the guarantors NIC; Affidavit from a Sri Lankan JP (Justice of Peace) or a Lawyer; Accommodation information (Place of stay)
Sudan	Visa required		
Suriname	eVisa		
Sweden	Visa required		
Switzerland	Visa required		
Tajikistan	Visa required		
Tanzania	eVisa / Visa on arrival	90 days	
Thailand	eVisa		
Timor-Leste	Visa on arrival	30 days	
Togo	eVisa	15 days	
Tonga	Visa required		
Trinidad and Tobago	Visa required		
Tunisia	Visa required		
Turkey	Visa required		
Turkmenistan	eVisa		
Tuvalu	Visa on arrival	1 month	
Uganda	eVisa	3 months	
Ukraine	Visa required		
United Arab Emirates	Visa required		May apply using 'Smart service'.
United Kingdom	Visa required		
United States	Visa required		
Uruguay	Visa required		
Uzbekistan	Visa required		
Vanuatu	Visa required		
Vatican City	Visa required		
Venezuela	eVisa		Introduction of Electronic Visa System for Tourist and Business Travelers.
Vietnam	eVisa		e-Visa is valid for 90 days and multiple entry.; Prearranged visa obtained online through travel agencies available at Hanoi, Ho Chi Minh City, Phu Quoc or Da Nang airports.; Phú Quốc Visa exemption for up to 30 days
Yemen	Visa on arrival	3 months	Visa on arrival issued free of charge.
Zambia	eVisa	90 days	
Zimbabwe	eVisa	3 months	

== Territories and disputed areas ==
Visa requirements for Syrian citizens for visits to various territories, disputed areas and restricted zones:

Visitor to	Visa requirement	Notes (excluding departure fees)
Kosovo	Visa required	Visa not required for holders of a valid biometric residence permit issued by one of the Schengen member states or a valid multi-entry Schengen Visa, a holder of a valid Laissez-Passer issued by United Nations Organizations, NATO, OSCE, Council of Europe or European Union a holder of a valid travel documents issued by EU Member and Schengen States, United States of America, Canada, Australia and Japan based on the 1951 Convention on Refugee Status or the 1954 Convention on the Status of Stateless Persons, as well as holders of valid travel documents for foreigners (max. 15 days stay)
Northern Cyprus	Visa required	
Palestine	Visa required	
Taiwan	Visa required	Syrian citizens are subject to special visa requirements and may only visit Taiwan under specific conditions, including official invitations, business activities, medical treatment, family visits, or participation in approved events.; Those visiting Taiwan on business must be interviewed by a Taiwanese consular officer, and their sponsors must submit a letter of guarantee to the Bureau of Consular Affairs in Taiwan.

== See also ==
- Visa policy of Syria
- Syrian passport
- Foreign relations of Syria
