= Italy–Syria relations =

Bilateral relations

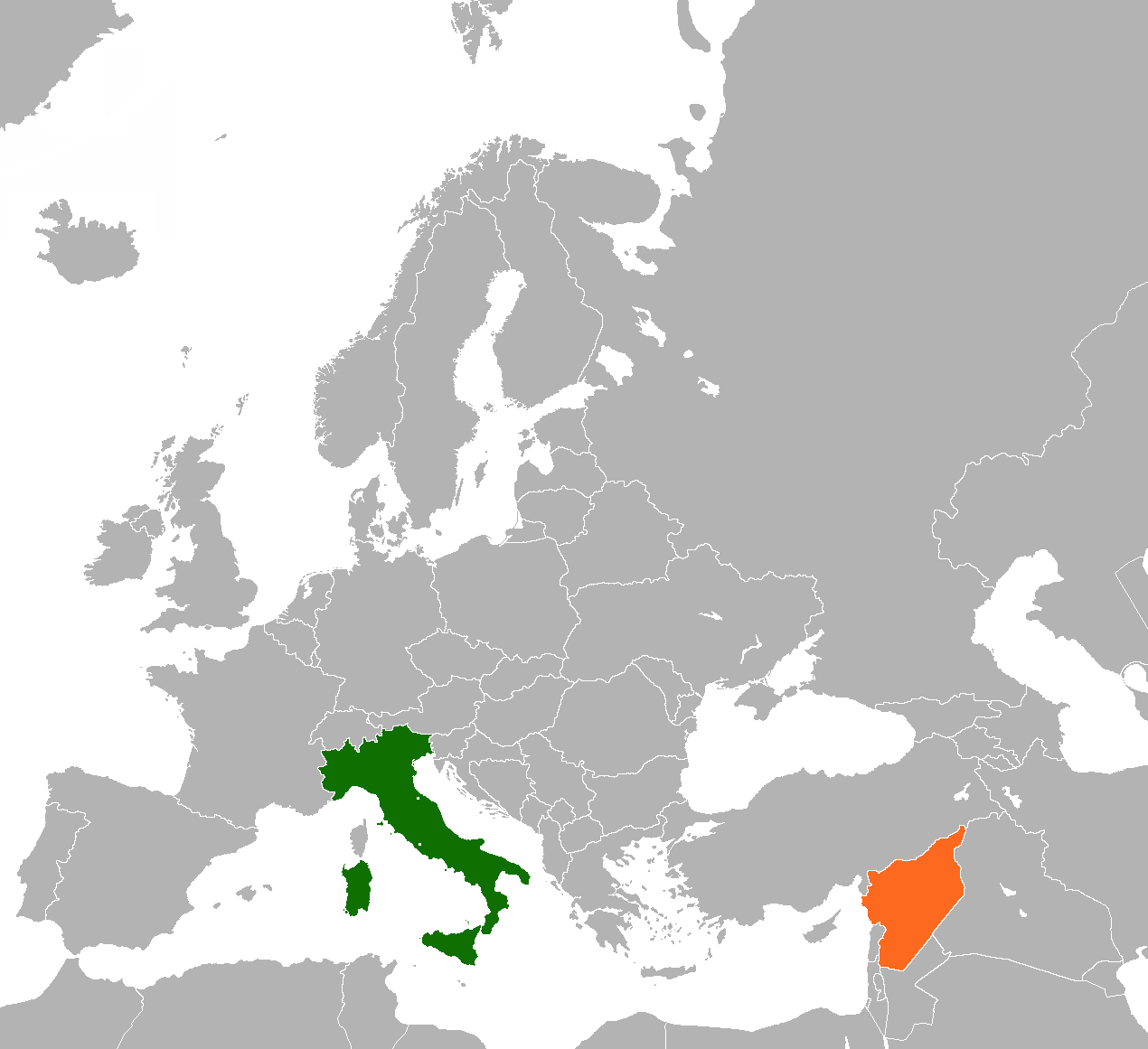
- Italy: Syria

Diplomatic mission
- Embassy of Syria, Rome: Embassy of Italy, Damascus

Italy–Syria relations refer to bilateral relations between the Italian Republic and the Syrian Arab Republic. The Syrian embassy in Italy is located in Rome, whereas the consulate was located in Milan. In 2024, Rome made the decision to start a reaprochement with the Ba'athist Syria and re-open its embassy in Damascus. After the fall of the Assad regime, a visit by the Italian Foreign Minister, Antonio Tajani, to Syria was made where he stated that: "Italy wants to serve as a bridge between Damascus and the European Union."

== History ==
The first contact between two organized political entities in the territories of Italy and Syria was in the decade before the conquest of Pompey of the Seleucid Kingdom in 64 B.C. During this period the Romans tried to make the Realm into a client Kingdom by exploiting the rivalries between the realms of the region. After these conquests, the Syrian territory became part of the Roman Mediterranean system as Roman Syria province.

After the fall of the Western Roman Empire the relations between the peninsula and Syria stagnated until the rise of the Maritime Republics that built their wealth on the commerce with the Middle East. Starting from the XI century, Amalfi's merchants were present in various forms in every major port of the region from which they traded spices, jewelry, and carpets.

Afterward, and until the opening of the oceanic route for commerce, the bond between the ports of Syria and those of the Italian Republics made both of them among the wealthiest cities in the world at the time.

With the beginning of the decline of the Italian maritime Republics, in the 1500s, the relationship between the European nations and the Ottoman Empire, in which the territories of Syria were included, deteriorated once again.

In the 1900s, during the Sanremo Conference, which took place from the 19th to 26 April 1920 the Allied Supreme Council of War, composed of Italy, France, United Kingdom, United States, and Japan, met to discuss the situation of the Middle East after the dissolution of the Ottoman Empire and the declaration of independence of the Arab Kingdom of Syria with the Coronation of King Faisal I on 8 March 1920.

== Diplomatic relations ==
After the beginning of the Syrian civil war, on 25 November 2011, Italian Foreign Minister, Giulio Terzi di Sant'Agata reiterated Italy's support to "organised opposition" in the shape of SNC. In March 2012 Italy decided to shut down its embassy and withdrew its diplomatic body from the Syrian territory, declaring that in virtue of the worsening of the situation. Italy did not recognize al-Assad's government as legitimate but refused to intervene in the region, contrary to other NATO members. Still, some political groups in Italy supported the Syrian government, such as the Italian Communist Party.

In 2011, the European Union adopted a decision (2011/273/CFSP) imposing an embargo on the export of weapons and instruments which could be useful for internal repression, it has forbidden any form of technical and financial assistance, it has frozen the assets, and the economic resources of those individuals held accountable for the repression of the Syrian population, and it has imposed restrictions on the admission in the European Union. In 2013, the Italian minister of foreign affairs Emma Bonino criticized the decision of the European Union to cease this embargo, adding that Italy would never supply weapons to Syria.

=== Normalization of relations (2016–2024) ===
Between 2016 and 2017, Mohammed Dib Zaitoun, then head of Syria's GID and Ali Mamlouk, then National Security Bureau director, held meetings with Alberto Manenti, then head of Italy's external security agency AISE with participation of Abbas Ibrahim, then director of Lebanese GSD. Additionally, Ali Mamlouk also reportedly visited Rome and met with Alberto Manenti and Minister of Interior Marco Minniti in early 2018. Between 2017 and 2019, two Italian delegations, led by Paolo Romani, a former chairman of the Forza Italia group in the Senate, travelled to Damascus to meet with Syrian officials.

In 2019, Italy announced it was considering re-opening its embassy. In 2020, the European Union imposed travel restrictions on individuals suspected of being linked with Assad's government and who are accused of financially supporting it, creating a list that contains 292 names. Despite the sanctions, in February 2023, the Italian Development Cooperation Agency signed a humanitarian agreement with the Syrian Arab Red Crescent.

On 28 May 2024, Giovanni Caravelli, the head of Italy's foreign intelligence service AISE, visited Damascus, Syria and met with President Bashar al-Assad and Hossam Louka, the director of GID, and expressed the desire of six EU countries to normalize relations with Damascus. On 26 July 2024, Rome made the decision to appoint a special envoy and chargé d'affaires to Syria, Stefano Ravagnan, becoming the first G7 state to restore relations with the country. On 12 November 2024, the Syrian embassy in Rome was reopened as a Consulate General. Later that month, on 20 November, the Italian embassy in Damascus was reopened with Stefano Ravagnan as the chief of mission.

=== Post-Assad relations ===
On 10 January 2025, the Italian Foreign Minister, Antonio Tajani, met in Damascus with Ahmed al-Sharaa, de facto leader of Syria. On 5 May 2026, Syria upgraded its Consulate General in Rome to an Embassy.

== Economic relations ==
Italy and Syria are both Mediterranean countries and they have strategic common interests. For this reason, Italy and Syria had relatively intense economic relations before the Syrian civil war.

Before the civil war, from 2004 to 2008, the imports of Italy from Syria amounted to €800 million, each year, whereas the exports from Italy to Syria amounted to €1 billion, each year. After the start of the civil war in 2011, the exchanges decreased and the imports from Syria to Italy amounted to €18 million, whereas exports from Italy to Syria amounted to €33 million.

The goods mainly exported from Italy to Syria were machinery of various kinds, chemical products, and medical products. The imported goods from Syria to Italy, in addition to oil, were leather goods and saddlery, travel items, bags, prepared and dyed furs, and meat. As of 2011 Syrian goods represented only 0.2% of Italy's whole economic exchange. The economic exchanges from Syria to Italy, as of 2019, amounted to €100 million, whereas the latest data, from January 2020 to July 2020, show that the economic exchanges dropped to €36.9 million.

Before the civil war began in 2011, Italy used to sell weapons to Syria, but the Council of the European Union imposed upon member States the embargo to sell weapons in Syria with the decision 2011/273/CFSP, which then was rendered applicable with the Council Regulation (EU) No. 442/2011 of 9 May 2011 concerning restrictive measures given the situation. These European laws forbid Italy to sell weapons directly or indirectly to Syria. Furthermore, it forbids Syria to provide financial support and froze the assets of all individuals deemed responsible for the conflict.

Economic exchanges with Italy (in million euros)
Year	Total exchange with Italy	Export Italy	Import Italy
2013	153,1	125,6	27,5
2014	194,4	177,6	16,7
2015	161,3	138,8	22,5
2016	78,4	70,9	7,5
2017	100,9	93,7	7,2
2018	111,7	104,0	7,7
2019	122,1	117,6	4,5
2020 (Jan-Jul)	36,9	35,4	1,6

== Migration ==
=== Syria to Italy ===
The number of Syrian citizens who have relocated to Italy, from 2015 to 2021, has increased. In 2015 there were 4.538 Syrian citizens in Italy and in 2018 this number increased to 5.892. This number has kept on increasing and in 2021 the number of Syrians in Italy amounted to 6.633. The regions with the biggest presence of Syrian citizens on their territories, in 2021, are Lombardy, with a total of 1,802 (27.2%); Lazio with 1,143 (17.2%) and Emilia - Romagna, with 518 (7.8%).

Many of these individuals traveling from Syria to Italy are asylum seekers or refugees, some of whom can reach Europe, through humanitarian corridors. For example, some humanitarian corridors are organized in Italy by religious organizations, such as the 'Comunità di Sant'Egidio', which in March 2022 was able to bring to Italy 105 Syrians, of which 38 were children. These humanitarian corridors have been organized since February 2016 with the collaboration of the Ministry of Internal Affairs and the Ministry of Foreign Affairs. Since then, the humanitarian corridors were able to bring 2150 people into Italy. These humanitarian corridors are organized also throughout Europe and through them, 4.400 asylum seekers have reached Europe.

=== Italy to Syria ===
In regard to Italian citizens in Syria, there is the phenomenon of foreign fighters, which are foreign citizens, who join the Islamic State of Iraq and Syria (ISIS) in order to support the cause. As of January 2017, the number of Italian citizens who have traveled to Syria in order to join ISIS amounted to 110 individuals, of which 32 have died, 17 have returned to Europe and 6 have returned to Italy.

== See also ==
- Foreign relations of Italy
- Foreign relations of Syria
- Syria–EU relations
- AL–EU relations
