= France–Syria relations =

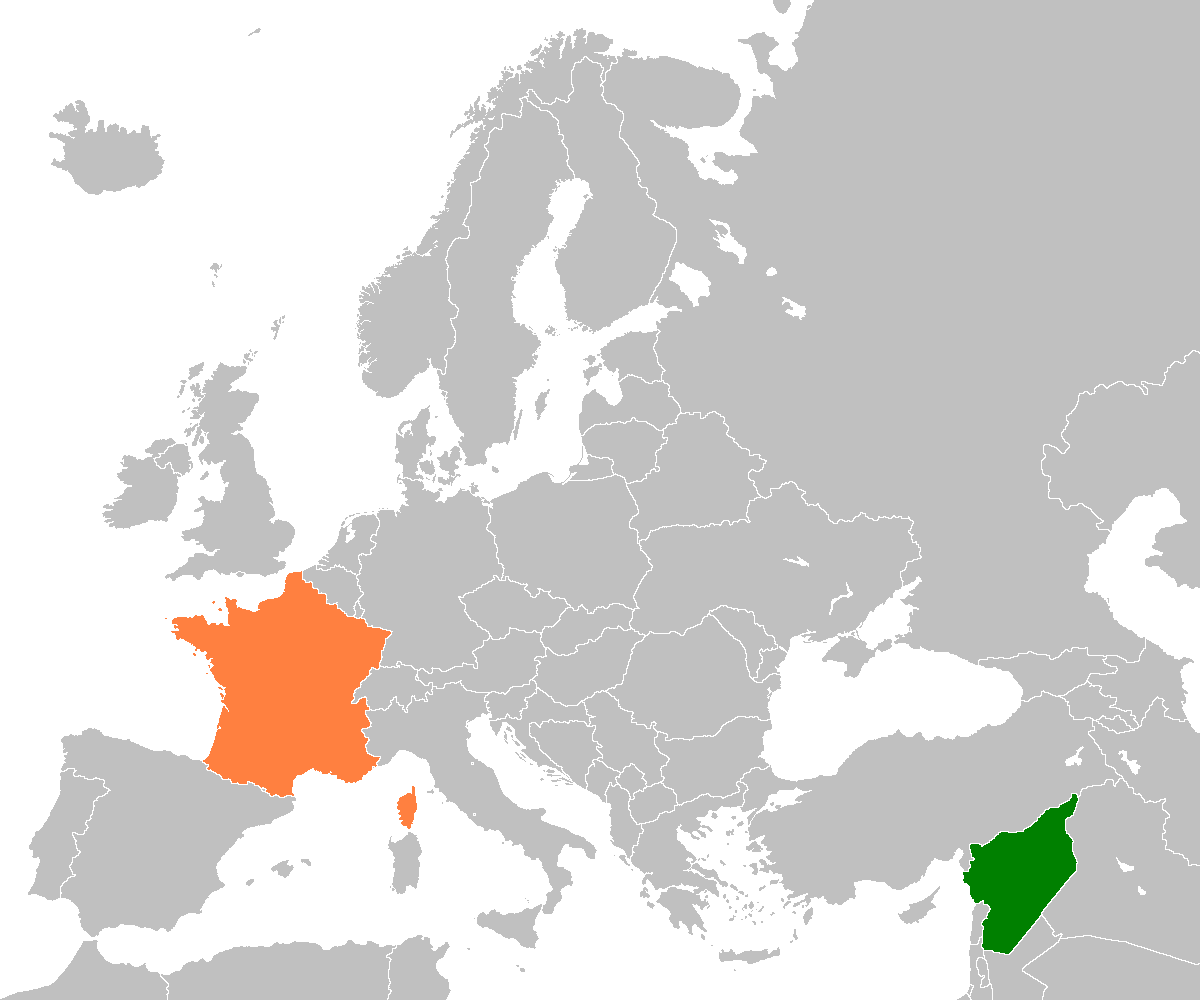
- Syria: France

France–Syria relations refers to the bilateral relations between the French Republic and Syrian Arab Republic. France has an embassy in Damascus and a consulate general in Aleppo and Latakia. Syria has an embassy in Paris and honorary consulates in Marseille and Pointe-à-Pitre. Both countries are members of the United Nations.

Relations between France and Syria have a long and complex history. The contemporary relationship largely dates back to the French mandate (1923–1946) over Syria established in the midst of the defeat and subsequent Partition of the Ottoman Empire at the end of World War I.

Despite the historical links between Syria and France, relations have often been strained as a result of the unstable condition of the Middle East's politics and France's foreign policies. France, since August 2011, insisted that the Syrian president, Bashar al-Assad, backed by Russia and Iran, must step down, and ever since, France had been backing the Syrian opposition. France was the first Western country to give recognition to the SOC on 13 November 2012. France has since then issued arrest warrants and prosecuted senior officials of the Syrian government, accused of abetting "crimes against humanity" and various war-crimes of the Assad regime. In May 2023, French Foreign Minister Catherine Colonna publicly called for the prosecution of Bashar al-Assad, labelling him as "the enemy of his own people". After an interruption of diplomatic relations for 13 years, France re-opened its embassy in Damascus following the fall of the Assad regime. In July 2026, French President Emmanuel Macron's visit to Syria marked the first occasion a Western leader had visited since the fall of the Assad regime.

== History of relations ==
=== Franco-Syrian War ===
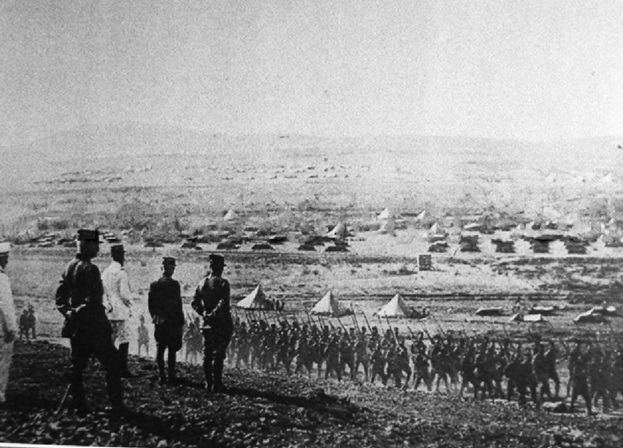
Henri Gouraud inspecting French troops before the Battle of Maysalun

Following the Arab Revolt which resulted in the defeat of the Ottomans in Syria, British troops led by General Edmund Allenby, entered the city of Damascus in 1918 accompanied by troops of the Arab Revolt led by Faisal, son of Sharif Hussein of Mecca, and an Arab government was established in Damascus in October 1918. Although the Arabs hoped, trusting earlier British promises, that the newly established state would include all the Arab lands stretching from northern Syria to Yemen, in accordance with the secret Sykes–Picot Agreement between Britain and France, only the interior regions of Syria were given to the Arab kingdom. On 8 October, French troops disembarked in Beirut and occupied the Lebanese coastal region. The French immediately dissolved the local Arab governments in the region, with France demanding full implementation of the Sykes–Picot Agreement, with Syria under its control.

On 14 July 1920, General Henri Gourard gave King Faisal the choice between submission or abdication. Faisal abdicated and fled. However, the minister of war, Youssef al-Azmeh, refused to comply. With little remaining troops of the Arab army, Bedouin soldiers and civilian volunteers, Azmeh composed an army and met the 12,000 strong French forces under General Mariano Goybet at the Battle of Maysaloun. The French won the battle and Azmeh died on the battlefield along with many of the Syrian troops, with the survivors defecting. Damascus was captured with little local resistance on 24 July 1920.

=== French Mandate for Syria and the Lebanon ===
Map showing the states of the French Mandate from 1921 to 1922

In 1923, following the Franco-Syrian War France was assigned the League of Nations mandate of Syria and Lebanon, starting from 29 September.

The mandate region was subdivided into six states. The states of Damascus, Aleppo, Alawites, Jabal Druze, the autonomous Sanjak of Alexandretta, and the State of Greater Lebanon. The drawing of those states was based on the sectarian demographics on the ground in Syria and was meant to prevent any unified nationalist revolts. However, nearly all the Syrian sects were hostile to the French mandate and to the division it created.

==== Great Syrian Revolt ====
On 23 August 1925, Druze leader Sultan Pasha al-Atrash officially declared revolution against French rule in Syria. Calling upon unification of all Syrian sects, ethnic communities and religions against French rule, he managed to enlist the aid of large sections of the population in the nationwide revolt which was led by many notable figures from all around Syria such as Hassan al-Kharrat, Nasib al-Bakri, Fawzi al-Qawuqji and Abd al-Rahman Shahbandar.

Although the revolt was initially declared on 23 August, fighting had begun with the Battle of al-Kafr on 22 July 1925, one month before that. Many battles would follow, resulting in rebel victories. France sent thousands of troops to Syria and Lebanon from its African colonies, equipped with modern weapons, compared to the meager supplies of the rebels. The French regained many cities, although fierce resistance against their rule lasted until the spring of 1927, when the revolution was suppressed with the shelling of Damascus. The French sentenced al-Atrash and other national leaders to death, but al-Atrash escaped with the rebels to Transjordan and was eventually pardoned, returning after the signing of the Franco-Syrian Treaty, met with a huge public reception.

==== Independence ====
Although Syria and France had previously negotiated a treaty of independence in September 1936, the treaty never came into force because of the French Legislature's refusal to ratify it. Following the Fall of France in 1940 during World War II, Syria came under the control of Vichy France until the British and Free French occupied the country in the Syria-Lebanon campaign. Pressured from Syrian nationalists and the British forces, France evacuated their troops on 17 April 1946, which marked the creation of the new, independent Syrian republic.

=== Post-Independence ===
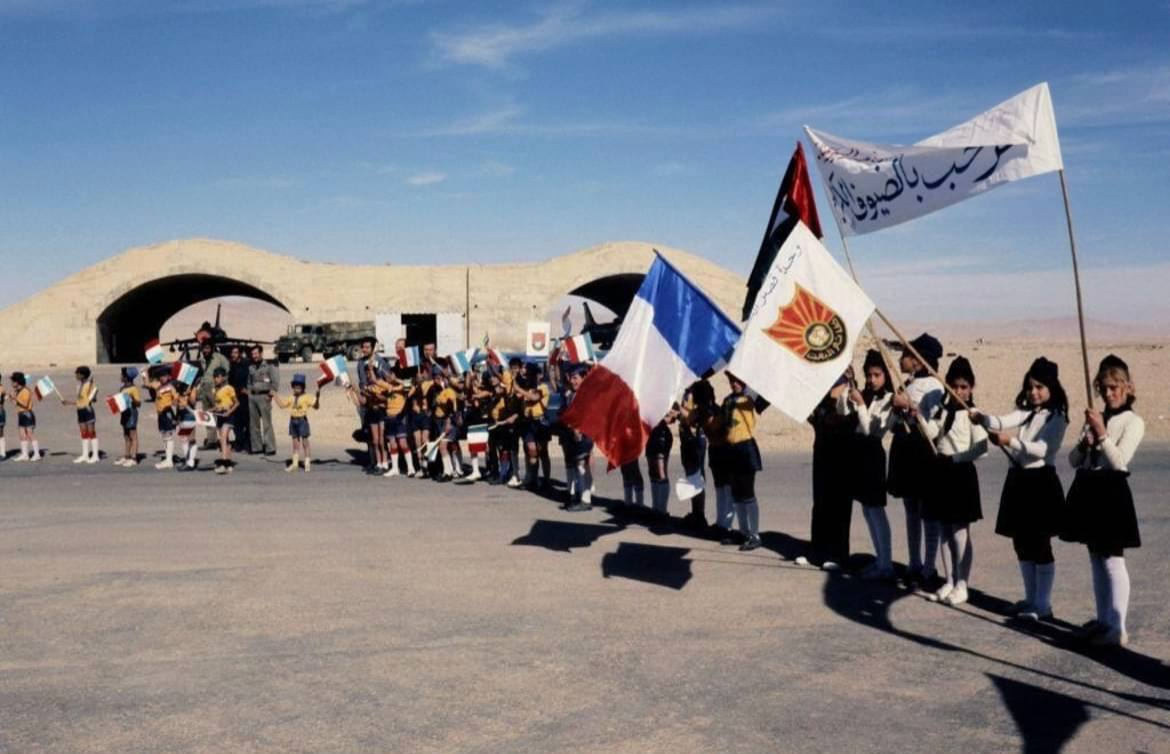
Children in Ba'ath Vanguard uniforms welcome the French Prime Minister at Syrian city of Palmyra, 1977

Both countries established diplomatic relations on 18 June 1946. Franco-Syrian relations remained well following the independence, marked with a historical background and shared cultural relations.

In June 2000, following the death of Syrian President Hafez al-Assad, French President Jacques Chirac attended his funeral, being the only western head of state to do so. Following the death of Rafiq al-Hariri, which Chirac blamed on Syria, Syria was isolated diplomatically by France.

French president Nicolas Sarkozy worked on pulling Syria out of isolation. He proposed for Syria to join the Union for the Mediterranean, with most EU countries complying and Syria joining the union, with Sarkozy later visiting Damascus and meeting with Syrian President Bashar al-Assad, making him the only western head of state to visit Syria following the assassination of Rafiq Hariri, blamed on Syria by western nations.

On 13 July 2008, Syrian president Bashar al-Assad visited Paris, meeting with President Sarkozy and attending the 14 July parade as a guest of honor.

==== Syrian Civil War ====
Following the outbreak of the Syrian Civil War, France called for President Bashar al-Assad to step down from power, and has provided opposition forces with non-lethal military aid, including communications equipment and medical supplies following the escalation of the armed conflict in 2012. French President Nicolas Sarkozy initiated the Friends of Syria Group in 2012 to seek a diplomatic solution to the Syrian conflict.

In August 2013, when the Syrian government was accused of using chemical weapons in the Ghouta area near Damascus, Paris called for military intervention but was isolated after the US president, Barack Obama, refused to act. Despite France not being involved militarily in the early phases of the conflict, in August 2014 French President François Hollande confirmed that France had delivered arms to Syrian rebels.

After the emergence of ISIL, France began conducting airstrikes against ISIL targets in Syria, and in mid-November 2015, in the wake of the 13 November Paris terror attacks, France, citing self-defence under Article 51 of the United Nations Charter, significantly intensified its air strikes in Syria, closely coordinating with the U.S. military.

Also mid inn November, France drafted a UN Security Council resolution urging UN members to "take all necessary measures" in the fight against Islamic State and al-Nusra Front. The following day the French-drafted resolution was co-sponsored by the UK. On 20 November 2015, the UN Security Council unanimously passed the French-British drafted-sponsored resolution. Also on 20 November, France dismissed Russia's suggestions that the French air strikes against oil installations in Syria were illegal, saying they were "an appropriate and necessary riposte" to attacks by Islamic State.

On 14 April 2018, French President Emmanuel Macron said in a statement that France's "red line has been crossed", in reference to the previous attacks on Douma. Beginning at 04:00 Syrian time (UTC+3), France, the United States, and the United Kingdom carried out a series of military strikes involving aircraft and ship-based missiles against multiple government sites in Syria. They said it was in response to the Douma chemical attack against civilians on 7 April, which was conducted by the Syrian government. The Syrian government denied involvement in the Douma attacks and called the airstrikes a violation of international law. On 20 April, the Syrian government returned the Légion d'honneur award that was given to President Bashar al-Assad by France in 2001, stating that he would not wear the award of a "slave country" to the US. Following the French participation in US led airstrikes on Damascus and Homs France began a "disciplinary procedure" for withdrawing the award.

In November 2018, France issued international arrest warrants for three high-ranking Ba'athist security officers over torturing and killing French-Syrian citizens. The accused officers included Ali Mamlouk, director of National Security Bureau of Syrian Ba'ath party and Jamil Hassan, former head of the Syrian Air Force Intelligence Directorate. In April 2023, a French court declared a tribunal for the regime officers charged with crimes against humanity, torture and various war-crimes. In May 2023, then French Foreign Minister Catherine Colonna publicly demanded the prosecution of Bashar al-Assad, blaming him for pursuing chemical warfare and killing hundreds of thousands of civilians, stating:

"the battle against crime, against impunity is part of French diplomacy. We have to remember who Bashar al-Assad is. He's a leader who has been the enemy of his own people for more than 10 years.. So long as he doesn't change, so long as he doesn't commit to reconciliation... so long as he doesn't fulfil his commitments, there's no reason to change our attitude towards him."

On 24 May 2023, the Syrian Ministry of Foreign Affairs and Expatriates strongly condemned this statement and responded with the following statement:

"We have recently followed the hysteric, isolated and detached from reality stances of French diplomacy, which has lost its senses after the historic decisions taken by the 2023 Arab League summit. France, along with its terrorist tools, has failed to achieve their goals in Syria. The dreams of patients at the French diplomacy to restore the inheritences of colonial era and domination on peoples are no longer valid for today's world which produces new values based on multipolar system, the rejection of immoral and inhumane economic sanctions, respect for the sovereignty and independence of states and equality among them."

=== Post-Assad Syria ===
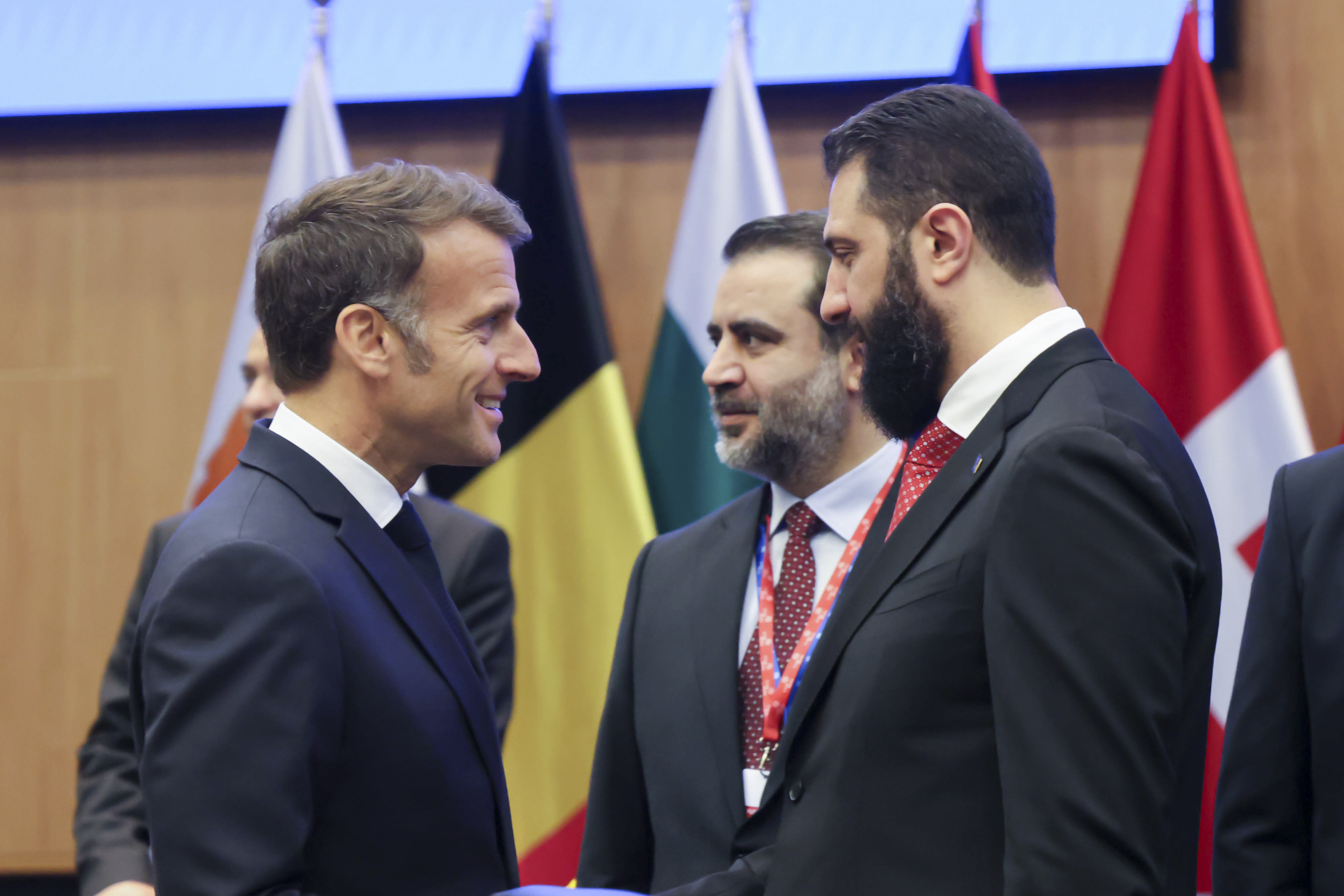
French President Emmanuel Macron, Syrian President Ahmed al-Sharaa, and Syrian Foreign Minister Asaad al-Shaibani, April 2026

Following the fall of the al-Assad regime and formation of a Syrian transitional government, France raised its flag on the French embassy in Damascus for the first time in 12 years. On 31 December 2024, French Armed Forces Minister Sebastien Lecornu stated that France committed airstrikes targeting ISIS bases in Syria during the weekend before.

On 3 January 2025, French Foreign Minister Jean-Noël Barrot visited Damascus to support Syria's political transition, in which he met with Ahmed al-Sharaa, leader of Hay'at Tahrir al-Sham, highlighting the importance of including Kurdish authorities in the process and stressing that a political solution requires the involvement of all key groups. He also met with Patriarch John X of Antioch, discussing the importance of a democratic Syria based on equality, citizenship, and human dignity. On 21 January 2025, two French investigating judges have issued an arrest warrant for former Syrian leader Bashar al-Assad on suspicion of involvement in war crimes.

On 5 February 2025, the Syrian port authority in Latakia signed a deal with the French shipping company CMA CGM to operate the container terminal at Latakia port, revising revenue distribution and lease terms.

On 7 May 2025, French President Emmanuel Macron met Syrian President Ahmed al-Sharaa in Paris. It was al-Sharaa’s first official European visit since taking office after Assad’s ousting in 2024. Macron supported lifting EU and U.S. sanctions on Syria if the interim government commits to justice and reforms. He also urged protection of all communities, especially minorities affected by recent violence.

Al-Sharaa confirmed indirect talks with Israel aimed at reducing tensions. The visit sparked debate due to his links with the Islamist group Hay’at Tahrir al-Sham, but Macron defended the engagement as a step toward regional stability and inclusive diplomacy.

On 18 January 2026, President Macron expressed his concern about the Syrian government offensive against the Kurdish–led SDF and his support for Syria's territorial unity. He called for the ceasefire to be made permanent and for integration of the SDF into the Syrian state structures per the March 2025 agreement. In January 2026, thousands of Kurdish demonstrators took to the streets across France to protest a major military offensive launched by the Syrian Army against Kurdish-held territories in Syria.

On 6 July, Macron visited Syria, in first visit by a western leader since the fall of Assad regime. During his visit, bombs exploded near the hotel he was staying in. Macron announced that France was ready to support the rebuilding of Syria's economy and banking sector, with the two countries signing cooperation agreements covering investment, infrastructure, transport, healthcare, banking and institutional development. He was accompanied by business leaders including Rodolphe Saadé of CMA CGM and Patrick Pouyanné of TotalEnergies, as part of efforts to encourage French investment in Syria's reconstruction.

France's Ministry of Foreign Affairs has called for Israeli forces to withdraw from Syrian territory and has voiced support for a "security agreement" between Syria and Israel. Paris regards any military deployment in the Area of Separation along the Syrian border as a violation of the 1974 Disengagement Agreement. France has also reaffirmed its full backing for UNDOF, the United Nations observer force tasked with monitoring the disengagement, stressing that the force's security must be preserved. The French position follows a UN report released on 8 September 2026, which documented a rise in Israeli attacks on Syrian territory. According to the report, ground incursions, patrols, raids, and searches are carried out routinely, displacing local residents. Israeli forces are said to persistently enter Syrian territory, assault Syrians and their property, conduct artillery and aerial bombardments in numerous instances, and set forests ablaze and demolish buildings.

== Resident diplomatic missions ==
- France has an embassy in Damascus.
- Syria has an embassy in Paris.

== See also ==
- Foreign relations of Syria
- Foreign relations of France
- Syria–European Union relations
- Arab League-EU relations
- French Mandate for Syria and the Lebanon
- Syrians in France
