= Syrian nationality law =

Syrian Citizenship Act

Parliament of Syria
- Long title: An Act relating to Syrian citizenship
- Citation: Act No. 276/69
- Territorial extent: Syria
- Enacted by: People's Council of Syria
- Enacted: 24 November 1969
- Signed by: President Nureddin al-Atassi
- Commenced: 24 November 1969
- Administered by: Ministry of the Interior

Repeals
- Legislative Decree 67/1961
- Status: Current legislation

Syrian nationality law is the law governing the acquisition, transmission and loss of Syrian citizenship. Syrian citizenship is the status of being a citizen of the Syrian Arab Republic and it can be obtained by birth or naturalization. The Syrian Nationality Law was enacted in 1969, by Legislative Decree No. 276/1969.

== The Law ==
The law that regulates Syrian nationality is Legislative Decree No. 276 issued on November 24, 1969.

== Acquisition of citizenship ==
Alleged cover of the Syrian biometric passport issued since 2025.

=== Nationality at birth ===
The Syrian nationality is determined predominantly by paternity (father) (see Jus sanguinis). The place of birth is irrelevant, and being born in Syria does not grant an automatic right to Syrian nationality. That is, in most cases, individuals are deemed to be Syrian nationals regardless of whether they are born inside or outside Syria as long as their father holds Syrian nationality. Birth in Syria does not in itself confer Syrian citizenship. Therefore, Jus soli does not apply.

Birth to a Syrian mother does not automatically confer nationality. If a Syrian woman marries a foreign husband, their children will have the foreign husband's nationality and have no claim to Syrian nationality, even if they were born and raised in Syria. The legal ramifications are that these persons face a number of obstacles, one of which is their inability to work in the public sector. It is also harder and more restrictive for foreigners to own real estate in Syria.

Children born in Syria to fathers who are Palestinian nationals, even if they themselves were born in Syria, are considered Palestinian not Syrian nationals. Although the Syrian Palestinian enjoys most of the rights available to the Syrian citizen except the right to vote and run for office. The special Syrian ID cards for Palestinian refugees are issued. "Only in very limited circumstances, such as the absence or statelessness of a father, could the mother grant her child Syrian citizenship."

=== Avoidance of statelessness ===
To avoid statelessness, under the legislative decree No. 2/2023, persons whose paternity is unknown or undeclared also acquire Syrian nationality if they are born in Syria in some circumstances.

For example, if born to a Syrian mother but are unable to determine who their father is, or a foundling born in Syria where both parents are unknown, or the parents have an unknown nationality or who do not in fact possess a nationality (i.e., are stateless); when they are born in Syria and were not at the time of their birth entitled to acquire a foreign nationality from their parents; and when they have Syrian origins but have not acquired another nationality.

However, these safeguards against statelessness at birth are not systematically implemented. Moreover, this provision only applies to children born in Syria and so clearly does not apply to the children of refugees from Syria who are born in host countries.

=== Implications for displaced persons ===
Displaced persons or refugees from Syria, such as refugees of the Syrian Civil War, may have difficulty establishing their father's Syrian nationality. For example, a marriage may not have been registered, marriage documents may have been lost, or the father may be dead, lost or have moved on to third countries, or their whereabouts or identity may be unknown.

A combination of these factors can mean that there is no legal or physical proof that a child's father is Syrian. In some neighbouring countries a child cannot be registered without legal proof of the father's identity. Since January 2023, when a refugee mother cannot prove that the father of her child is Syrian, to avoid statelessness, the child is granted Syrian citizenship.

== Naturalisation ==
The other way to acquire Syrian nationality is through naturalisation. The nationality law gives the Ministry of Interior the authority to regulate the naturalization of foreigners but also allows for special considerations.

Non-nationals who have resided in the country for over 5 years and fulfil a number of other requirements can apply for naturalisation. The requirements are eased for individuals from another Arab country, such as the requirement to be able to speak and read Arabic fluently.

A foreign woman who marries a Syrian man can naturalise on the basis of that marriage, but a foreign husband cannot acquire Syrian citizenship on the basis of marriage to a Syrian wife.

== Loss of Syrian nationality ==
The nationality law does not give Syrians the right to unilaterally abandon their Syrian nationality. Syrians may not forfeit it if they acquire a foreign nationality, but only with the consent of the Syrian authorities. Furthermore, Syria reserves the right to revoke a person's Syrian nationality under certain circumstances, such as those involving matters of national security.

== Dual nationality ==
Dual nationality is recognized by Syria. Though Syrian law recognizes dual citizenship, it also states that a Syrian with dual citizenship is considered a Syrian citizen first.

== See also ==
- Syrian passport
- Visa requirements for Syrian citizens
- Visa policy of Syria
