= Visa policy of Syria =

Policy on permits required to enter Syria

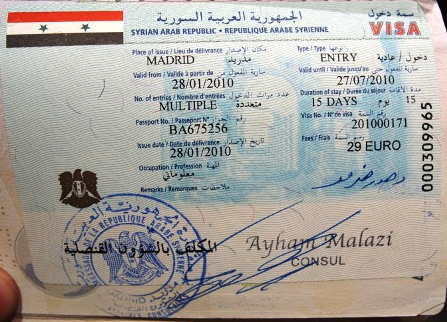
Syrian visa in 2010

Syria imposes entry visa fees (visa on arrival or e-visa) on its visitors based on a "principle of reciprocity" – as of April 2026 the situation at the land border is still unclear – Israeli citizens are banned from entering or transiting through the country, Iranian citizens are required to obtain a prior authorization, and Lebanese citizens who do not hold a valid residence permit in another country or do not have at least one family member who is a Syrian citizen are required to obtain a prior visa (obtainable at any port of entry).

For entry via Aleppo or Damascus International Airport, citizens of certain countries can enter visa-free, while others are required to obtain a visa on arrival or a traditional visa via the nearest Syrian embassy. The eVisa platform is no longer operational.

Iranian visitors can obtain a visa from one of the Syrian diplomatic missions.

== History ==
Before the Syrian civil war, hostilities and conflicts and the start of the devastating Civil war in Syria in 2011, citizens of many Asian, European, African and American countries visited Syria without a visa or got a visa on arrival, gradually Syria began to cancel visa-free entry and visa on arrival for many countries, and in 2014 the Syrian authorities officially announced the introduction of a visa regime for all countries. However, citizens of some states de facto entered Syria without a visa or received a visa on arrival. The visa policy of Syria was extremely unstable, and there was no exact data on the visa policy of the country and while entering Syria, the Syrian authorities sometimes asked tourists to obtain a Syrian visa in advance by contacting one of the country's diplomatic missions in the world.

Until 2014, citizens of the former Soviet republics of the USSR (excluding the Baltic republics), Iran, some Asian, African, European, American countries, and almost all countries of the Arab world did not need a visa to enter Syria. According to IATA, which provides information provided by national governments, despite the Syrian government's officially stated the need to obtain a visa in advance, a visa on arrival was still de facto valid for citizens of Armenia, Azerbaijan, Belarus, Egypt, Iran, Kazakhstan, Kyrgyzstan, Russia, Tajikistan, Turkmenistan and Uzbekistan, but after the intensification of the Civil war, some citizens of these countries were denied a visa on arrival “for security reasons” and asked citizens of these countries to obtain a Syrian visa in advance:

Since May 2018, after the recognition of partially recognized Abkhazia and South Ossetia by Syrian Arab Republic, citizens of these countries entered Syria after obtaining a visa. In 2023, the Syrian Ministry of Finance imposed a new fee, which obligated foreign vehicles entering the country to pay a $100 fee for a temporary visit, valid for a period of two weeks. The amount doubled ($200) for vehicles that had been in the country for up to four months. Jordanian and Lebanese vehicle plates were excluded from the requirement.

In April 2024, the introduction of electronic visa was announced, starting 1 May.

In January 2025, and after the fall of the Assad regime, the Syrian transitional government announced a new visa policy, restricting entry to the country to Lebanese and Iranian citizens and banning Israeli citizens. While Iranians are required to obtain an authorized visa. All other nationalities are either required to obtain a prior e-visa or pay a visa on arrival fee while entering the country, based on a "principle of reciprocity".

== Visa policy map ==
Visa policy of Syria (according to Timatic) Syria Visa not required Visa on arrival Visa required in advance Authorised visa required Admission refused

== As of right ==
- Syria
Citizens of Syria do not require a visa to enter, reside, study, and work indefinitely in Syria, and are not subject to any immigration requirements. They may enter with the Syrian passport, national identity card, individual civil status record, driver's license, expired passport or civil extract issued by Syria. Accompanying passengers (mother, wife or children) can obtain a visa on arrival.

The same rules also apply to Palestinian refugees with Syrian documents which were granted (with little exceptions) the same rights and duties as Syrian citizens by Law no 260 for 1956.

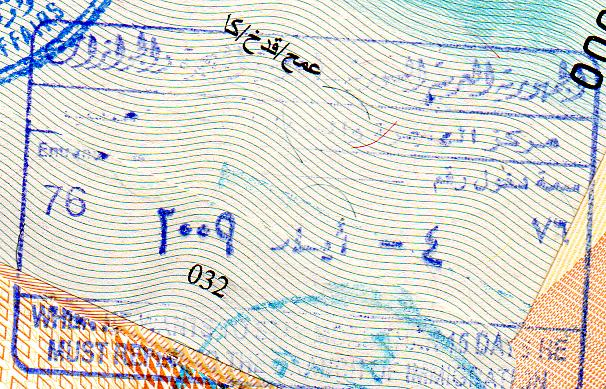
Syrian entry stamp in 2009

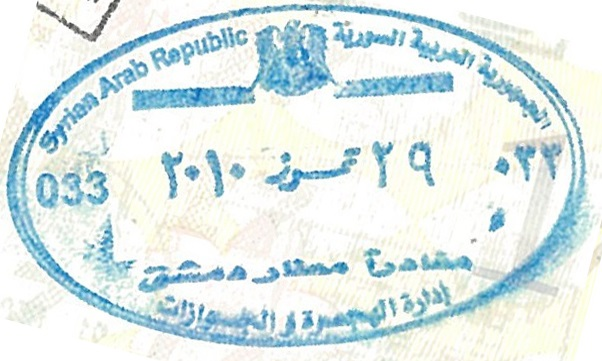
Syrian departure stamp from Damascus International Airport in 2010

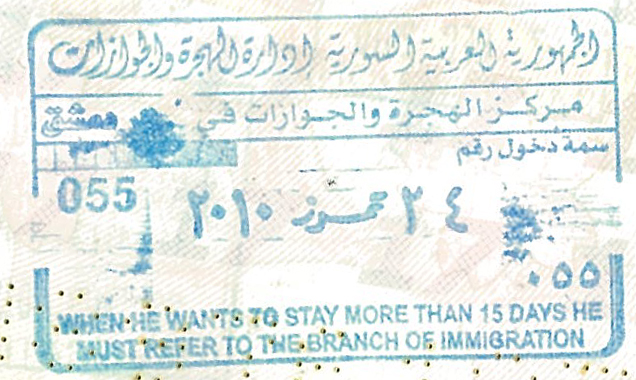
Syrian entry stamp in 2010

== Visa exemption ==
Citizens of the following countries can visit Syria without a visa when arriving at Aleppo or Damascus International Airport:

- Algeria
- Jordan
- Lebanon
- Mauritania
- Morocco
- Sudan
- Tunisia
- Turkey
- Yemen

== Visa on arrival ==
Citizens of the following countries may obtain a visa on arrival for a fee when arriving at Aleppo or Damascus International Airport, for stays up to the durations listed below:

Unknown

- (Cooperation Council for the Arab States of the Gulf) All Gulf Cooperation Council member states

30 days

- All European Union member states
- All European Free Trade Association member states
- United Kingdom
- United States

15 days

- Azerbaijan
- Belarus
- Georgia
- Kazakhstan
- Kyrgyzstan
- Malaysia
- Moldova
- Tajikistan
- Turkmenistan
- Uzbekistan

Citizens of Russia are also eligible for a 15 day visa on arrival. However, they must obtain an OK to board approval at least 48 hours before departure.

== Land border ==
The land border situation is currently unclear. While some sources report that many nationalities can obtain a visa on arrival, conditions on the ground change frequently.

== Electronic visa (e-visa) ==
Syria has introduced an e-visa platform available to citizens of all countries and territories except Israel and Iran. Currently the platform is not operational.

== Visa required in advance ==
Nationals of the following country must obtain a visa in advance:

- Iran

== Israel-related entry restrictions ==
Nationals of Israel are banned from entering and transiting in Syria, even if not leaving the aircraft and proceeding by the same flight due to the non-recognition of this state, and accordingly, the passport of this state by Syria, which considers Israel an enemy state. Entry and transit into the Syria will be refused to holders of passports or other travel documents of all countries containing a visa, or an entry/exit stamp of Israel, or an Egyptian or Jordanian border stamp issued by an office bordering Israel, or any information that a person has ever been to Israel, or an indication of any connection with the State of Israel.

== Visitor statistics ==
Before the outbreak of the Syrian civil war in 2011, Syria was one of the most popular tourist destinations in the Middle East. Tourism and the entry of foreigners into Syria in general began to develop especially since the late 1990s. Foreigners entered Syria not only to visit relatives or friends, but also for tourism, medical treatment and pilgrimage to Islamic and Christian sites, as well as for trade, as Syria became an important trading hub for the surrounding countries. Syria was popular especially for citizens of Turkey, Iran, almost all countries of the Arab world, Europe and South Asia, as well as for almost all countries of the Post-Soviet space as a budget travel option and a shopping point for merchants.

Year	Visitors
Until 1994	No data
1995	2,253,000
1996	▲2,435,000
1997	▼2,332,000
1998	▲2,464,000
1999	▲2,682,000
2000	▲3,412,000
2001	▲3,671,000
2002	▲4,678,000
2003	▲4,837,000
2004	▲6,334,000
2005	▼5,859,000
2006	▼5,682,000
2007	▼5,434,000
2008	▲6,951,000
2009	▲7,721,000
2010	▲10,970,000
2011	▼6,476,000
2012—2015	During these years, during the height of the civil war, the official government of the Syrian Arab Republic did not control most of the borders of Syria, especially the border with Turkey and Iraq, which is why many foreigners entered the country at that time, the number of which cannot be calculated accurately.
2016	▼1,043,000 (Many more foreigners have entered the country through the borders of Syria, which are not controlled by the official Government of the Syrian Arab Republic)
2017	▲1,291,000 (Just as it was said above)
2018	▲1,802,000 (Just as it was said above)
2019	▲2,424,000 (Just as it was said above)
2020	No data
2021	▼750,000 (Just as it was said above)
2022	▲1,850,000 (Just as it was said above)
2023	▲2,000,000 (Just as it was said above)

=== By country ===
The list does not include Russian citizens who entered Syria through third countries, as well as through the uncontrolled borders of Syria by the official government of the Syrian Arab Republic. Especially between 2012 and 2016, the real number of Russian citizens who entered Syria was several times more.

Country	2021	2020	2019	2018	2017	2016	2015	2014	2013	2012	2011	2010
Russia	▲33,839	▲32,215	▼29,370	▲31,614	▼21,743	▲25,436	▲7,868	▼1,784	▼1,835	▼4,012	▼9,944	15,256

== See also ==
- Visa requirements for Syrian citizens
- Tourism in Syria
