= Embassy of Syria, Rome =

Embassy in Rome, Italy

Embassy of the Syrian Arab Republic in Rome السفارة السورية في روما
- Location: Parioli, Rome
- Address: Via Bruxelles 51, Rome, 00198
- Coordinates: 41.923635°N 12.499352°E
- Ambassador: Hussein Sabbagh

The Embassy of Syria in Rome (Arabic: السفارة السورية في روما) is the diplomatic mission of Syria to Italy.

== History ==
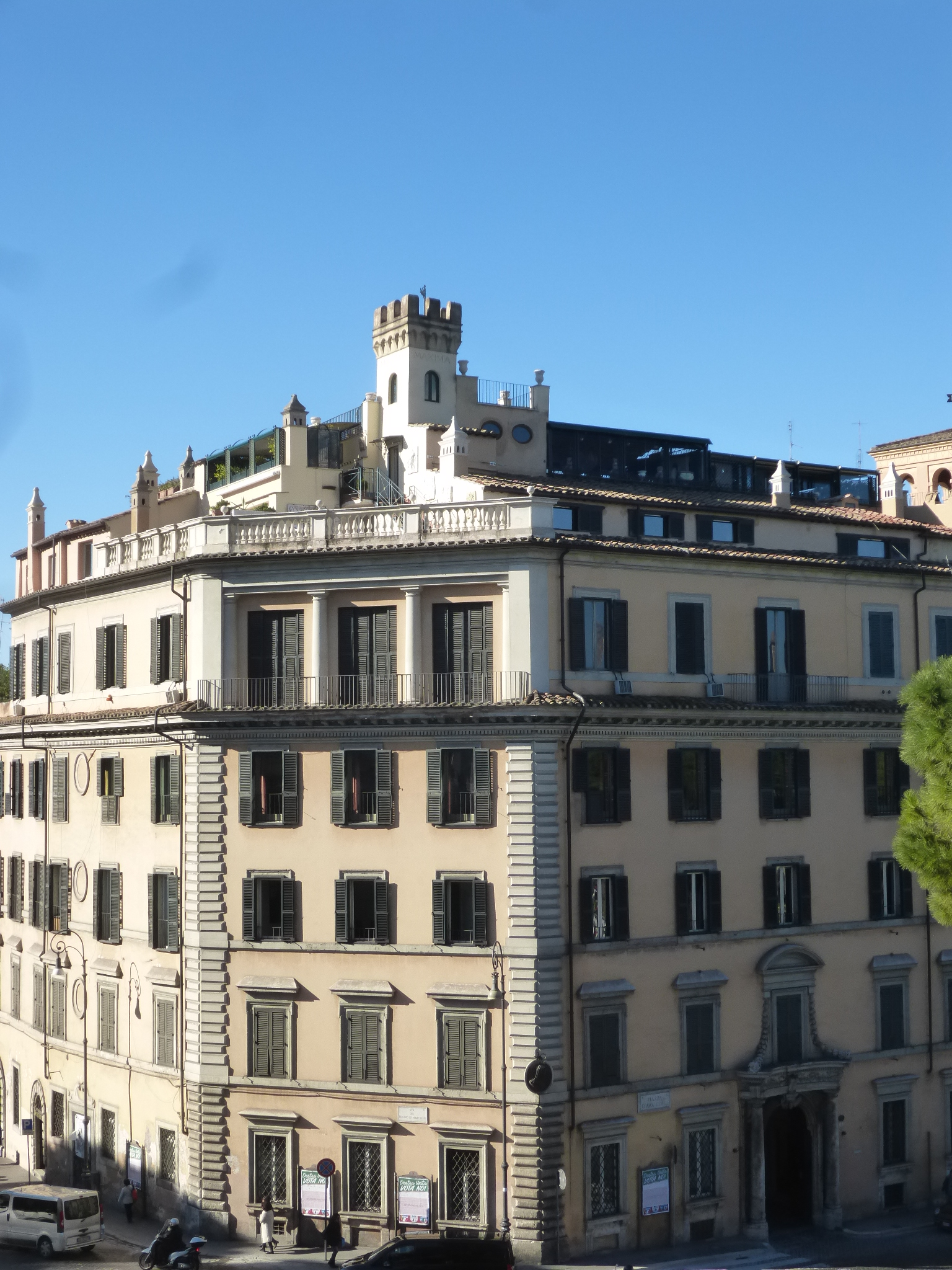
Massimo di Rignano Palace In this picture, the Ba'athist Syrian flag has already been removed from the entrance gate (bottom right).

Before the outbreak of the Syrian civil war, Syria maintained an embassy in Rome located at Piazza d'Aracoeli 1, housed on the second floor of a section of the baroque Massimo di Rignano Palace, on Capitoline Hill.

During the civil war, the embassy became the target of protests. In 2012, a group of Syrian nationals attempted to storm the diplomatic premises in protest against the massacres taking place in Syria. On 29 May 2012, Italy, together with France, Belgium, Germany, the United Kingdom, and Spain, expelled the Syrian ambassador. The ambassador to Italy, Khaddour Hasan, was declared persona non grata, leading to the closure of the Syrian Embassy in Rome.

In July 2024, a few months before the Fall of the Assad regime, Italy became the first G7 country to reopen a Syrian diplomatic office. However, the office did not become operational until 12 November 2024, a month before the fall of Assad.

The new Syrian diplomatic mission is no longer located at Piazza d'Aracoeli but at Via Bruxelles 51, in the Parioli quartiere, near Villa Ada. The office is situated on the same street as the Embassy of the People's Republic of China and the Embassy of the Republic of North Macedonia, and adjacent to the Embassy of Iran to the Holy See.

The reopened mission did not hold the status of a full embassy from 12 November 2024 to 5 May 2026 but operated as a Consulate General. It was expected to be upgraded to a full embassy once the political situation in Syria stabilizes. The upgrade happened in May 2026, when the Syrian Embassy in Rome reopened and Hussein Sabbagh was named Syrian Ambassador to Italy. The Consulate General from November 2024 was de facto abolished and the duties were taken by the newly reopened embassy in Rome.

== See also ==
- List of diplomatic missions of Syria
- Italy–Syria relations
