= Syrian passport =

Passport of the Syrian Arab Republic issued to Syrian citizens

- The front cover of a contemporary Syrian biometric passport
- Type: Passport
- Issued by: (Syria) Ministry of Interior (Syria) Immigration and Passport Directorate
- First issued: 1929 (first version); 21 August 2023 (biometric)
- Purpose: Identification, proof of citizenship,travel
- Eligibility: Syrian citizenship
- Expiration: 6 years

The Syrian passport (Note: Arabic: جواز سفر الجمهورية العربية السورية, romanized: Jawāz Safar Al-Jumhūriyyah Al-ʿArabiyyah Al-Sūriyya) is a travel document issued by the government of Syria to Syrian citizens for international travel. It can also be issued on behalf of the directorate at various Syrian diplomatic missions outside of Syria.

== History ==
=== Biometric passport ===
In late 2016, Syria's Department of Immigration and Passports announced that it is planning to change to biometric passports.

In early 2019, Syria's Interior Minister announced that the country is getting ready to release its new passport. In August 2023, Syria officially introduced the biometric passport, which notably dropped the usage of the French Language and kept Arabic and English.

On 3 July 2025, the Syrian transitional government unveiled a redesigned Syrian passport as part of the country's newly adopted visual identity following the fall of the Assad regime. The updated passport features a green cover and incorporates a newly introduced national emblem.

== Issuance procedure ==
The processing time for Syrian passports varies depending on the type of service requested. Ordinary passports are typically issued within 14 working days, while expedited passports are processed within 1 to 3 days. As of August 2025, the fee for ordinary processing is US$200, and the fee for urgent (expedited) processing is US$400.

=== Facilitations during the civil war ===
In April 2015, Syria changed its passport requirements so that Syrians outside Syria, including refugees who have fled the Syrian Civil War, are eligible for passports without having to go through a review by the intelligence services. Passports will be issued to Syrians "even if they left in an illegal manner or they hold non-official passports or travel documents", likely referring to passports issued by Syrian opposition representatives in Qatar.

However, the government was also criticized for increasing fees and limiting the ease of obtaining passports for Syrians abroad throughout the war, with costs going from less than US$20 in Syria to hundreds or even a thousand dollars needed to renew a passport in Turkey between official fees and corruption. This was seen as a way to obtain foreign currency reserves and fund al-Assad's administration. Consular revenues increased from 0.4% of government income in 2010 to 5.4% in 2023. Some countries supplied Syrian refugees with a certificate of identity or a refugee travel document due to the issues with getting a new passport.

== Types ==
=== Common feature ===
Syrian passports include the following data on the information page:

- Photo of the passport holder
- Type (“PN” for ordinary passports, “PD” for diplomatic passports, “PL” for special passports, “PS” for service passport)
- Country Code (SYR)
- Passport number
- Name and surname of the passport holder
- Date of Birth (DD/MM/YYYY)
- Sex
- Place of birth (For people born in Syria only the name of the governorate of birth is written, for people born outside Syria only the country of birth is written)
- Father name and mother name
- Holder's national ID number (written under the photo of the holder)
- Date of expiry (DD/MM/YYYY)
- Place of Issue (For passports issued in Syria the name of the governorate of issue is written followed by a number specifying the centre within the governorate, for passports issued outside Syria only the country of issue is written)
- Date of issue (DD/MM/YYYY)

The information page ends with the machine readable zone.

The items are identified by text in Arabic and English (e.g., "تاريخ الولادة / Date of birth")

=== Passport note ===
The passports contain inside the front cover a note that is addressed to the authorities of all countries and territories, identifying the bearer as a citizen of Syria and requesting that he or she be allowed to pass and be treated according to international norms:

In Arabic:

يُطلب من موظفي حكومة الجمهورية العربية السورية ومن ممثليها في الخارج ويرجى من كل سلطة أخرى تعمل باسم الحكومة العربية السورية ومن السلطات المختصة أن تسمح لحامل هذا الجواز بحرية المرور وأن يقدم له كل ما يحتاج إليه من مساعدة ورعاية.

In English:

Officials of the Syrian Arab Republic and the diplomatic and consular authorities and any other authority acting on behalf of the Syrian Arab Government together with the relevant foreign authorities are kindly requested to let this passport holder pass freely and to give him the assistance and protection he may need.

=== Ordinary passport ===
Ordinary passports are passports that are issued to Syrian citizens. They are green-colored, with the country's emblem emblazoned in the center of the front cover.
The words "الجمهورية العربية السورية" and their English translation "SYRIAN ARAB REPUBLIC" are centered on the top, whilst the words "جواز سفر" and their English translation "PASSPORT" are centered on the bottom, with the biometric passport symbol positioned below. Three transparent golden-colored stars are also seen at the very top.

== Physical appearance ==
=== Ordinary biometric passport ===
An ordinary Syrian passport contains 48 pages, each two of them (excluding the first three and the last one, which include governmental notations and the holder's information) have a Syrian landmark.

==== Front Cover exterior ====
Emblem of the Syrian Arab Republic

- Front Cover interior and page 1
- Pages 2 and 3

Holder's Information

- Pages 4 and 5

Citadel of Aleppo, Aleppo Governorate

- Pages 6 and 7

Umayyad Mosque, Damascus Governorate

- Pages 8 and 9

Jabar Citadel, Raqqa Governorate

- Pages 10 and 11

Busra Amphitheatre, Daraa Governorate

- Pages 12 and 13

Deir ez-Zor Suspension Bridge, Deir ez-Zor Governorate

- Pages 14 and 15

Citadel of Salah ed-Din, Latakia Governorate

- Pages 16 and 17

Hama Waterwheels, Hama Governorate

- Pages 18 and 19

Palmyra Theatre, Homs Governorate

- Pages 20 and 21

Al-Marqab Citadel, Tartus Governorate

- Pages 22 and 23

Convent of Saint Thecla, Rif Dimashq Governorate

- Pages 24 and 25

Ain Diwar Bridge, Al-Hasakah Governorate

- Pages 26 and 27

Gothic Church of Qalb Lozeh, Idlib Governorate

- Pages 28 and 29

Nimrod Fortress, Quneitra Governorate (Note: The Fortress is de facto in Israel's Northern District as it is located in the Israeli-occupied Golan Heights, which the international community, with the exception of Israel and the United States, regards as Syrian territory held under Israeli occupation)

- Pages 30 and 31

Qanawat, As-Suwayda Governorate

- Pages 32 and 33

October War Panorama, Rif Dimashq Governorate

- Pages 34 and 35

Souq Al-Hamidiyah, Damascus Governorate

- Pages 36 and 37

Euphrates Dam, Raqqa Governorate

- Pages 38 and 39

Krak des Chevaliers, Homs Governorate

- Pages 40 and 41

Afamia, Hama Governorate

- Pages 42 and 43

Saint Simon Citadel, Aleppo Governorate

- Pages 44 and 45

Martyrs' Monument, Rif Dimashq Governorate

- Pages 46 and 47

Citadel of Damascus, Damascus Governorate

- Page 48 and Back Cover interior

Countries and territories with visa-free or visa on arrival entry for holders of ordinary Syrian passports

== Visa requirements ==
Visa requirements for Syrian citizens are administrative entry restrictions by the authorities of other states placed on citizens of Syria. As of April 2025, Syrian citizens had visa-free or visa on arrival access to 27 countries and territories, ranking the Syrian passport 101st which is the second least powerful passport in the world in terms of travel freedom, only behind the Afghan passport, according to the Henley Passport Index.

== Gallery ==
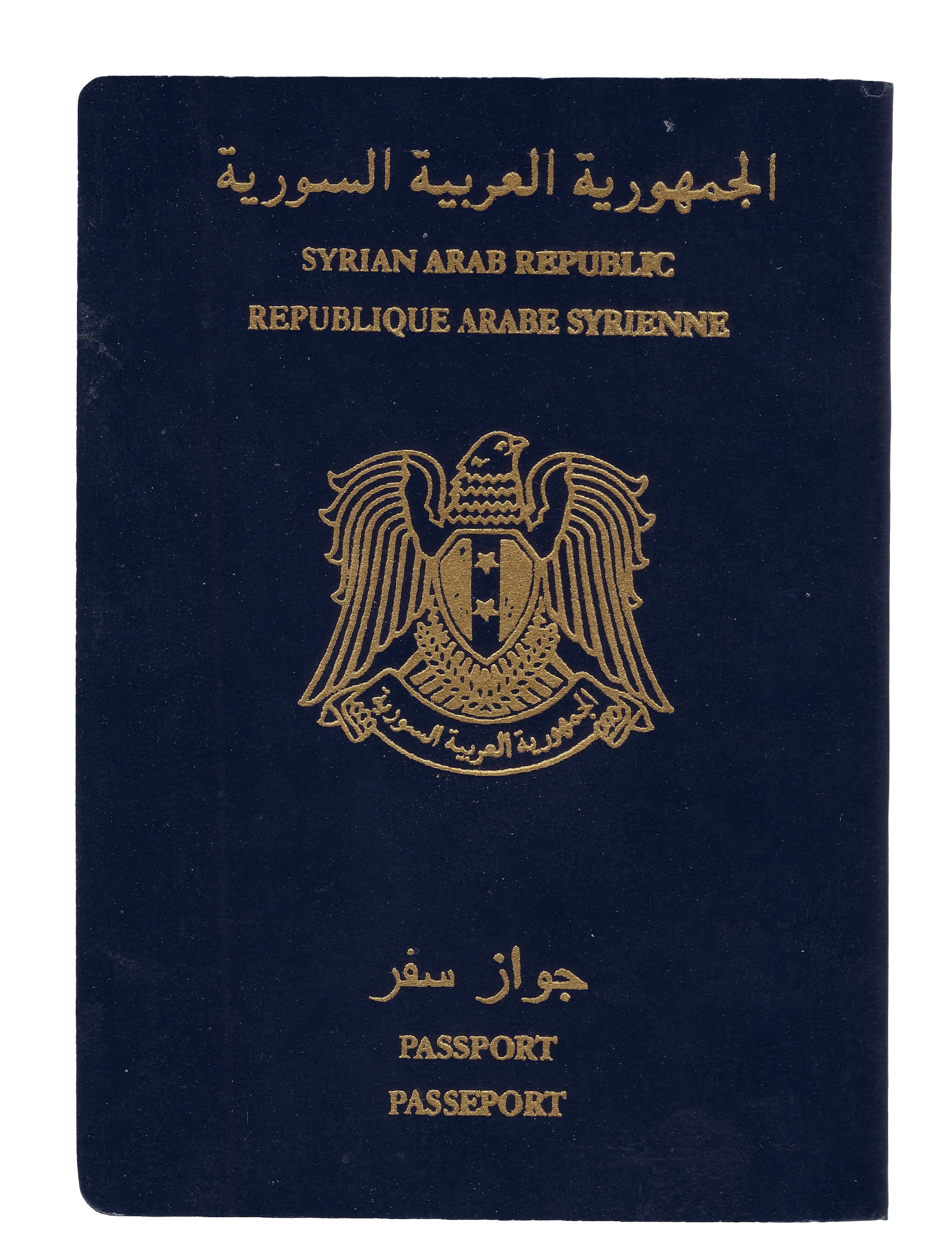
Front Cover of an ordinary non-biometric Syrian passport issued until 2023.

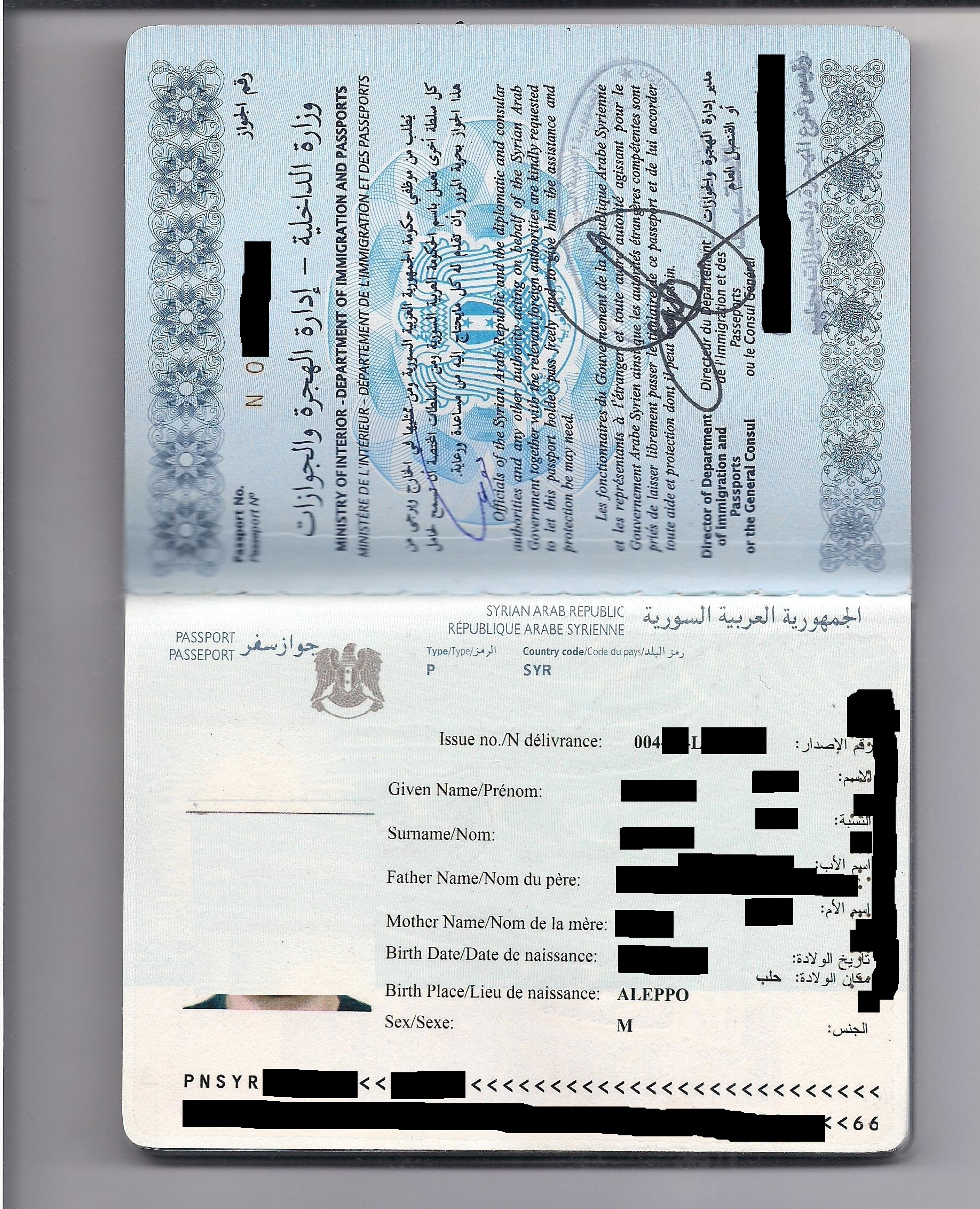
Front Cover interior and page 1 of an ordinary non-biometric Syrian passport issued until 2023.

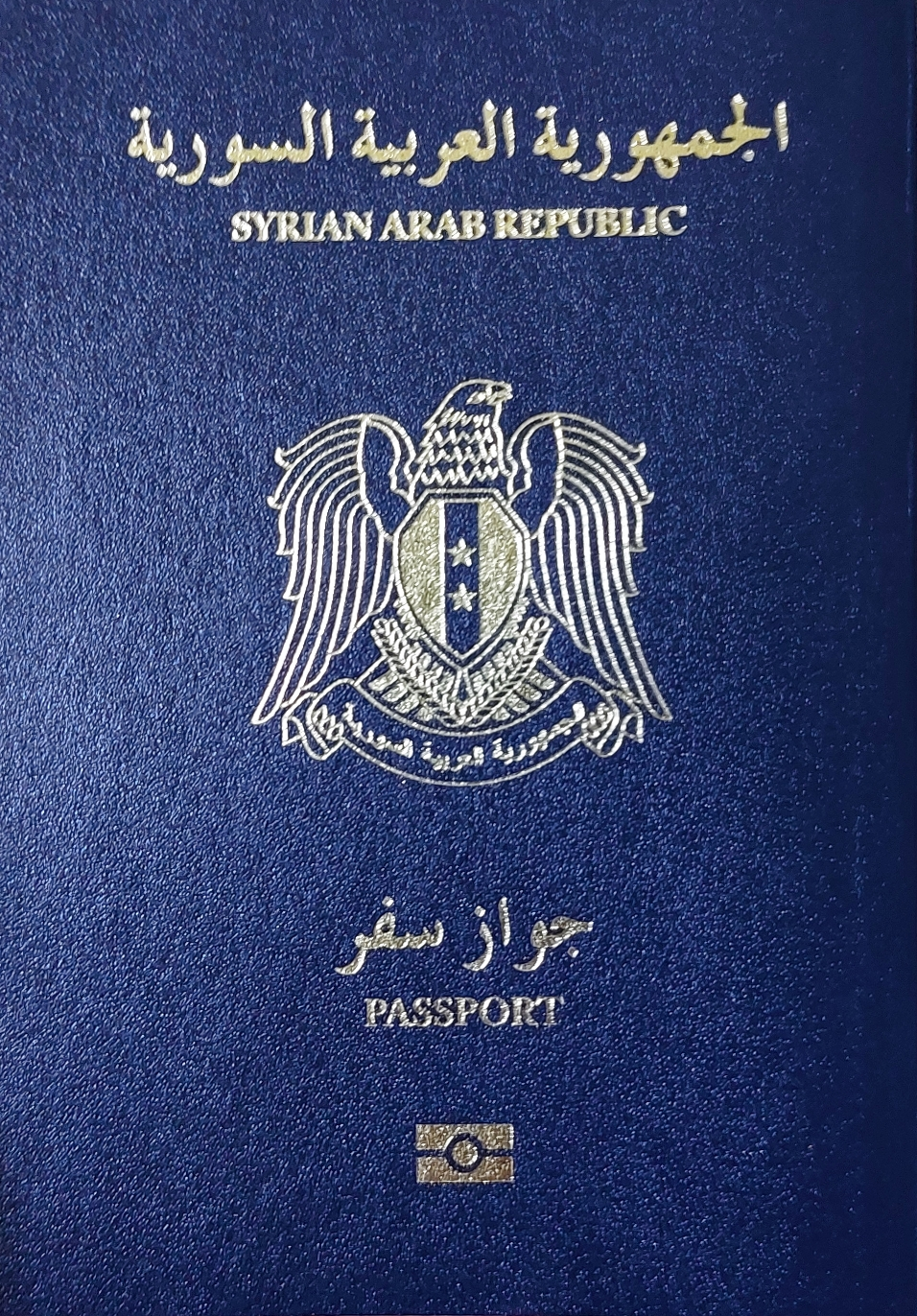
Front cover of a biometric Syrian passport issued from 2023–present.

Front cover of the new biometric Syrian passport, yet to be issued.

== See also ==
- Visa requirements for Syrian citizens
- Visa policy of Syria
- Syrian nationality law
