= Embassy of Syria, Paris =

Diplomatic mission in Paris, France

Embassy of Syria in France سفارة الجمهورية العربية السورية في باريس Ambassade de la République arabe syrienne
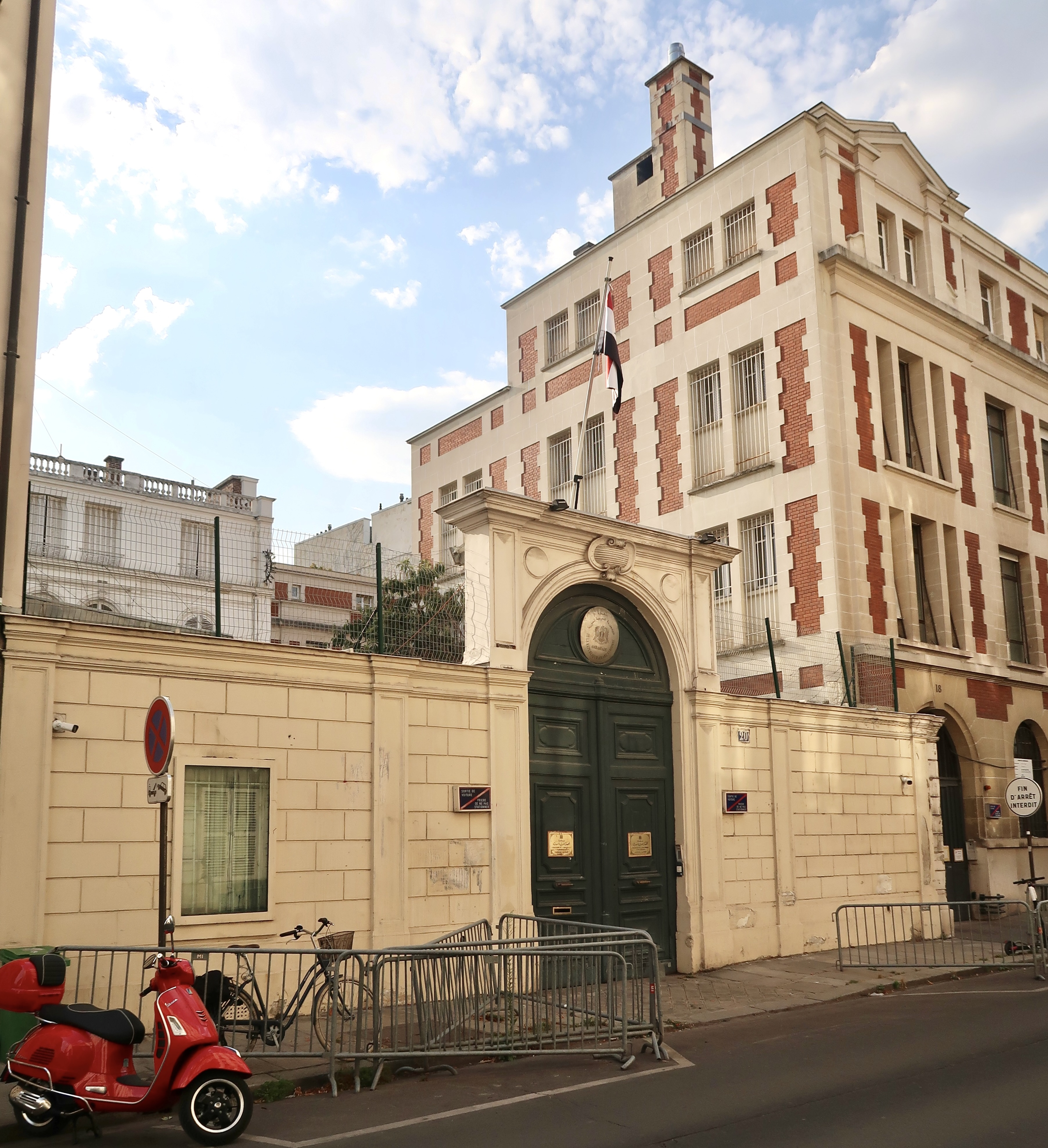
- Embassy entrance
- Location: Paris, France
- Address: 20 Rue Vaneau, 7th arrondissement of Paris
- Coordinates: 48°51′13″N 2°19′08″E
- Jurisdiction: France; Andorra; Monaco
- Chargé d'affaires: Louay Fallouh
- Website: ambassadesyrie.fr/new/

The Embassy of Syria in Paris (Arabic: سفارة الجمهورية العربية السورية في باريس; French: Ambassade de la République arabe syrienne à Paris) is the diplomatic mission of the Syrian Arab Republic to France. It is located at 20 Rue Vaneau in the 7th arrondissement of Paris.

== History ==
The Syrian Embassy has been located at its current location since 1980; previously it was located in a villa at 22 Boulevard Suchet, which now houses the Embassy of Monaco. This move, which had been planned for several years, was however precipitated by an attack on the embassy on January 29, 1980.

Its Ambassador, also Permanent Delegate of Syria to UNESCO, was Lamia Chakkour. She was declared, along with two other officials from the embassy, to be a persona non grata on May 29, 2012, following a decision by the French Foreign Ministry, motivated by the Houla massacre.

On November 17, 2012, the President of the Republic, François Hollande, announced that France would welcome in Paris an ambassador from the Syrian Opposition Coalition, the French-speaking diplomat Monzer Makhous.

== See also ==
- France–Syria relations
- Foreign relations of Syria
- Foreign relations of France
