= Statelessness in Lebanon =

A stateless person is, according to article 1 of the New York Convention relating to the Status of Stateless Persons of 28 September 1954, "any person who is not considered as a national by any State under the operation of its law".

In Lebanon, statelessness is a phenomenon intimately linked to the history of the creation of the Lebanese state, but also to its status as a host country for refugees fleeing the various conflicts that have broken out in the Middle East.

Although their number is extremely difficult to evaluate, the number of stateless people in Lebanon is in the tens of thousands, and their origins and profiles are very varied. Because of its history of hosting several refugee populations (Armenians and Christians from the Ottoman Empire, Palestinians and now Syrians), Lebanon has been confronted with statelessness linked to a migratory context since its creation. The link between demographic balance and the distribution of power between the different confessional communities is also a powerful factor of exclusion of certain groups, deprived of the Lebanese nationality, producing situations of statelessness in situ.

== Statelessness in situ ==
Lebanese stateless persons, or stateless persons of Lebanese origin (or descent), are persons who do not hold Lebanese nationality, although they have very close ties with Lebanon, the country to which they consider themselves to belong. They have lived most of their lives, if not all of their lives, in Lebanon, the country where their parents and ancestors resided, regardless of whether the latter have Lebanese nationality or are stateless themselves.

Lebanese stateless persons find the origin of their status in the negligence or ignorance of their parents who did not register their birth, or in the fact that one or both parents (most often the father, as the Lebanese mother cannot pass on her nationality to her children) are themselves stateless.

More generally, Lebanese stateless persons are persons who could obtain citizenship of their country of residence, Lebanon, according to the Lebanese nationality law, but are excluded for a number of reasons.

=== Magnitude of the phenomenon ===
In the absence of an official census since the last one conducted in 1932 by the French Mandate authorities, the number of stateless persons of Lebanese origin living in Lebanon is very difficult to assess. An initial study by the Lebanese NGO Frontiers Ruwad Association in 2011 estimated their number at between 80,000 and 200,000, excluding stateless Palestinian refugees from this estimate.

In a 2012 study of 1,000 Lebanese families with at least one stateless member, the same NGO gave a new estimate of this population, putting it at 60,000.

In their 2013 study, Dawn Chatty, Nisrine Mansour and Nasser Yassin estimate that between 100,000 and 150,000 Bedouins live in Lebanon, mainly in the Bekaa plain. Of this number, two-thirds – up to 100,000 people – would not hold Lebanese nationality and would be stateless.

There are reportedly between 3,000 and 5,000 stateless Kurds in Lebanon in 2014. According to the U.S. State Department, out of a population of 10,000 Kurds living in Lebanon, about 1,500 are deprived of Lebanese nationality.

The Lebanese Doms are another group that has long been excluded from Lebanese nationality. Although most of them obtained it thanks to the naturalization decree of 1994, a study by the associations Terre des hommes and Tahaddi conducted among 206 Doms households (1161 individuals) in 2011 showed that one fifth of them were stateless, while the Dom population represents 3112 individuals in Beirut and South Lebanon. A more recent household survey led by Tahaddi, in Fall 2019 in Hay el-Gharbeh, showed that about 40% of the Dom living there and surveyed were stateless. "A total of 897 households were included in the sample, with 897 primary respondents providing information on a total of 3,843 members".

The UNHCR only refers to "tens of thousands" of stateless persons residing in Lebanon, noting the severe lack of statistics on them.

The population of Wadi Khaled, in the Akkar region, near the Lebanese Syrian border, was stateless for a long time, before being almost entirely naturalized by the 1994 decree. Today, there are between "a few hundred" and 1,600 stateless people left in this region, who represent barely 1% of the population counted in the Search for Common Ground report.

Without citing sources, in an interview with Lebanese women's rights activist Lina Abou Habib, the newspaper OZY gave the figure of about 80,000 stateless Lebanese, not to be confused with "Syrian refugees born without papers or Palestinians who still don't have a country". The figure of "100,000 stateless Lebanese children" was also put forward by the French-language daily newspaper L'Orient-Le Jour in 2016, seeming to focus on stateless minors, without giving any sources.

There are reportedly between 18,000 and 24,000 Lebanese stateless people still living with "Under Consideration" status after the 1994 naturalization decree, according to Samira Trad, head of the legal support program for stateless people at Frontiers Ruwad.

In a 2019 report, The Plight of the Rightless. Mapping and Understanding statelessness in Tripoli, the Lebanese association MARCH Lebanon reassessed these potentially overestimated numbers. Based on a survey of stateless persons of Lebanese origin living in the city of Tripoli, the NGO counted 1400 stateless persons, and estimates the number of Lebanese stateless persons to be 27,000 persons in the whole of Lebanon.

As the MARCH report notes, these figures, as well as those that attempt to estimate the population of Palestinian and Syrian refugees in the country, are subject to over- or under-estimates linked to the political strategies of Lebanese actors.

=== Categories of Lebanese stateless persons ===
The Plight of the Rightless distinguishes three different categories of Lebanese stateless persons.

First, an unregistered person (ghayr mousajjal, غير مسجل) is defined as a person born to a Lebanese father and whose birth has not been registered by either parent. Unregistered persons do not have a personal status file. However, they can file a lawsuit for late registration of birth in order to obtain Lebanese nationality, once all the required documents are available. Illegitimate children of Lebanese parents are also included in this category. Unregistered persons represent the majority of Lebanese stateless persons.

"Maktoum Al Qayd" (MAQ, مكتوم القيد) refers to a person who was born to a stateless father or unknown parents, of Lebanese or non-Lebanese origin, but who has been a long-term resident of Lebanon. MAQ persons have no identity papers and are not registered in the official Lebanese censuses, making their nationality unknown. Therefore, they have no connection with Lebanon or their country of origin. They may be children of unregistered fathers, with Lebanese grandparents or great-grandparents, but with no proof of Lebanese ancestry. Abandoned children are also included in this category.

"Under study" (جنسية قيد الدرس) is a category that refers to people of undetermined nationality who have been given "Under study" status by the General Directorate of General Security. These individuals were not counted in either the 1932 census or any subsequent statistical initiative in Lebanon. As such, they were initially issued official cards stating that they were of "undetermined nationality". After the entry into force of the Law of 10 July 1962 regulating entry, residence and exit from Lebanon, these cards were replaced by residence cards indicating that the nationality of their holders is under consideration. Thus, the "Under Study" category provides legal status but does not confer full citizenship. Persons "Under Consideration" are considered aliens. They are required to apply for a special residence permit for one or three years in exchange for an annual fee of $200. However, the spouses and children of Lebanese women who are "under study" are exempt from this annual fee. The status of "Under Study" is hereditary and inherited from the father at birth.

=== Origins of statelessness in situ in Lebanon ===
==== Historical origins of the phenomenon ====
The principle of nationality was introduced in Lebanon in the second half of the 19th century, with the adoption of the Ottoman nationality Law of 19 January 1869, which granted it to the subjects of the Ottoman Empire, within the framework of the Tanzimat.

After the victory of the Allies at the end of the First World War and the dismemberment of the Ottoman Empire, the State of Greater Lebanon was created by the Decree n° 318 of the French High Commissioner, General Henri Gouraud, on 31 August 1920, under the League of Nations Mandate granted to France.

A first census of the population of Greater Lebanon was conducted by the Mandate officials in March 1921. Identity cards proving the Lebanese nationality were distributed to the persons who answered this census, the decree 1307 of 10 March 1922 declaring that all the registered individuals would be recognized as Lebanese and would be eligible to participate in elections.

The Treaty of Lausanne, signed on 24 July 1923, stipulates in its Article 30 that "Turkish [i.e. Ottoman] nationals established in the territories which, by virtue of the provisions of the present treaty, are detached from Turkey, will become, by right and under the conditions of the local legislation, nationals of the State to which the territory is transferred". Persons residing in the territory of Lebanon on that date will therefore ipso facto obtain Lebanese nationality, which is a matter of Jus soli.

Lebanese nationality was legally created on 30 August 1924 by the High Commissioner's decree n°2825 (at the time, Maxime Weygand), taken in application of the Treaty of Lausanne, which states that "any person who was a Turkish [i.e. Ottoman] subject and who resided in the territories of Lebanon on August 30, 1924, is confirmed as a Lebanese subject and is henceforth considered to have lost Turkish [i.e. Ottoman] citizenship".

Many people did not register in the first census of 1921 and were unable or unwilling to prove their residence in the territory of Greater Lebanon on 30 August 1924. These people lost their Ottoman nationality, without acquiring Lebanese nationality or identity card, even though they were residing in Lebanon at that date. This caused a first wave of Lebanese stateless people.

The decree n°2825 is completed by the decree 15/S of the High Commissioner Maurice Sarrail of 19 January 1925, according to which "the individual whose father is Lebanese is himself Lebanese. The Lebanese woman does not transmit her nationality to her children, except in exceptional cases. To be naturalized, the foreigner must be married to a Lebanese, have resided in Lebanon for at least five years or have rendered exceptional services to the Nation. However, naturalization is subject to the prior approval of the State, except for the foreign woman who marries a Lebanese man".

The Lebanese constitution, adopted on 23 May 1926, specifies in its article 6, chapter II "Of the Lebanese, their rights and duties", that "Lebanese nationality, the manner in which it is acquired, retained and lost, shall be determined by law". This "Lebanese nationality law" is defined by the High Commissioner's Order 15/S of 19 January 1925. It is still in force today and has been amended several times, in 1934, 1939 and 1960.

Two laws were voted by the Chamber of Deputies, on 17 November and 19 December 1931, to organize a second census of the population of the Lebanese Republic at the beginning of 1932. The summary of this census was published in the number 2718 of the Official Gazette of 10 October 1932.

This second census allowed the naturalization of more than 200,000 people, the majority of whom were Christians, thanks to Article 13 of Decree No. 8837 of 15 January 1932, which states that "Refugees from Turkish territories such as Armenians, Syriacs, Chaldeans and members of the Greek Catholic and Orthodox churches, or other persons who are of Turkish origin, shall be counted as Lebanese provided that they were found on Lebanese territories on August 30, 1924 according to Regulation 2825".

Article 12 of Decree No. 8837 requires that persons who respond to this new census must be able to prove that they "normally" reside more than six months per year in Lebanese territory to be recognized as Lebanese. In fact, many Sunni Bedouins who move seasonally between the Bekaa Valley and Syria have been excluded from Lebanese nationality because of this decree. "In 1920, nomads still made up 30% of the Syrian population and less than 10% in Lebanon. A part of these hundreds of thousands of people circulated between the two states in formation".

Decree no. 8837 specifies that people who cannot prove their residence on Lebanese territory as of 30 August 1924, or who cannot present an identity card – such as those distributed after the 1921 census – will be counted as "foreigners". They are registered as having no nationality, i.e. as stateless, "foreigners" represent more than 60,000 people in the 1932 census.

Several groups had called for a boycott of the 1921 census to oppose the French colonial enterprise in the Levant. This was the case of inhabitants of the southern and northern regions of Lebanon, which were predominantly Muslim, who were unable to prove their residence on 30 August 1924, and were therefore recorded as "foreigners" in the 1932 census. Similarly, many Bedouins who had fought the French troops in Marjayoun and Rayak in 1920 refused to recognize the legitimacy of the French mandate over Lebanon. It was in opposition to this colonial presence that a majority refused the census and naturalization undertakings, and were therefore excluded from Lebanese nationality, creating a large wave of stateless people.

While refugees of the Christian faith were specifically mentioned in decree no. 8837, and declared eligible for Lebanese nationality, Muslim refugees, such as the Kurds who fled Turkey in the mid-1920s, were forbidden to be counted as Lebanese, and a majority of them thus became stateless.

Those registered as "foreigners" in the 1932 census were categorized as "undetermined nationality" and given an identification card specific to this status. These people could initiate a legal procedure to obtain Lebanese nationality until 1958, but many of them refrained from doing so for several reasons. These reasons included the fear of being conscripted by the Lebanese army and having to perform their military service; the fact that many had entered Lebanon illegally, and feared having to face the authorities and the justice system; and the lack of general information about the rights and duties related to this "undetermined nationality" status.

Decree No. 10188, regulating the entry and stay of foreigners in Lebanon and their exit from the country, was promulgated on 28 July 1962. Following this decree, the Ministry of Interior issued instructions to regulate the stay of different categories of foreigners in Lebanon. The Lebanese General Security services subsequently created specific registers, as well as the category and status of "nationality under study". There are also the names "Nationality under consideration" or "under review". In Arabic, it is called "Jinsiyya Qayd ad-Dars" (جنسية قيد الدرس). This new status replaces the category of "undetermined nationality", the holders of this card are given new cards by the General Security marked "Nationality under consideration".

According to Youmna Makhlouf, the replacement of the "undetermined nationality" cards by "under study" cards was a practice that was put in place by the General Security in 1962, and which was not regulated by any law. However, Chatty explains that the "Under Study" category was created by a Lebanese law passed in 1958, and in particular intended to change the status of Bedouins who had been registered as having no nationality (Maktoum al-Qayd) following the 1932 census.

Makhlouf considers the creation of the category "Under study" by the administration (here the General Security) as a breach against the Lebanese legislature and against the Lebanese nationality law of 1925. It is true that this new status allows an official and legal recognition of these people, whose nationality is "under study" by the State services, and offers them a certain number of economic and social rights, notably the right to work in the formal sector or to own movable property. However, the Lebanese state services have left people in this "Under Study" status, which is supposed to be temporary, for decades, without any progress being made for them. Moreover, this status deprives these people of clauses 2 and 3 of Article 1 of the Lebanese nationality law of 1925. The first one declared Lebanese any person born in the territory of the Greater Lebanon and who was proven to have been granted no other nationality at birth. The second declared Lebanese any person born in the territory of the Greater Lebanon of unknown parents or of parents whose nationality is unknown.

On the contrary, it is now impossible to register a child born to a father whose nationality is "Under study", even if the mother has Lebanese nationality. The child will thus also obtain the category "Under study", a status that is hereditary, and will be deprived of the Lebanese nationality.

Since there was no law governing the replacement of "indeterminate nationality" cards by "under study" cards by the General Security services, the Minister of the Interior at the time wished to put an end to these practices. He issued two decisions, the first on 29 April 1970 (no. 3204), and the second on 2 June 1970, ordering General Security to stop this replacement process. Since then, this status has only been given to children born to fathers whose "nationality is under study".

Law no. 68 of 1967 declares that the Court of First Instance is the competent court to judge cases concerning stateless persons seeking Lebanese nationality. However, this law does not give a clear and precise definition of what a "stateless person" is in the eyes of the Lebanese judicial system.

==== Populations specifically affected by statelessness in situ ====
===== The Doms =====
The Doms are a particularly marginalized and discriminated population in Lebanon, where they are referred to by the pejorative term Nawar, even though their presence in the country goes back several centuries. They form a separate community, mostly Muslim, that is not recognized by the Lebanese state. This distance from the Lebanese authorities and social grouping have long been factors of exclusion of Doms from the Lebanese nationality. As a Nomadic community, like the Bedouins, many of the Doms escaped the various population censuses carried out under the French Mandate, and many of them were later on granted the status of "nationality under study". Despite a massive naturalization, granted to a majority of the Doms following the decree of 1994, many are still stateless today. In the Terre des hommes study, 72% of the respondents had Lebanese nationality, acquired through the 1994 naturalization decree. 15.9% of the respondents had no nationality, and 5.7% had the status "Under study". The Dom population of Beirut and South Lebanon is estimated at 3112 individuals, and about one fifth of this population is stateless. This report focuses only on these two regions and does not mention the Doms of the Bekaa or other Lebanese regions, which suggests that the number of stateless Doms is even higher.

Many Doms women were registered as "single" in the 1994 naturalization decree, and since the Lebanese woman cannot pass on her nationality to her children, many of the latter are now considered "Maqtoum al-Qayd".

Among the reasons for the persistence of statelessness among the Doms, the use of midwives and home births, as well as high rates of illiteracy among parents are all obstacles to birth registration. This forms a vicious circle, as non-registration of births leaves Dom children stateless, unable to take exams, and with low levels of education or not attending school at all (as is the case for 77% of children aged 4).

===== The Arabs, or Bedouins, of Wadi Khaled =====
The Arabs of Wadi Khaled, or Bedouins of Wadi Khaled, are a population of Bedouin origin, of Sunni faith. They live in the region of Wadi Khaled, made up of 23 villages belonging to the Akkar District, near the northern border of Lebanon. The Arabs of Wadi Khaled have long been stateless, since the members of this Bedouin tribe escaped the 1932 census. Several narratives coexist on this historical episode. Many tribesmen were illiterate and mistook the French census officials for Ottoman civil servants, as one tribal leader explained in an interview published by the Los Angeles Times in 1989. Because they feared to be conscripted into the Ottoman army, not knowing that it no longer exercised any power in the Levant at that time, the Bedouins of Wadi Khaled went into hiding to avoid the census. Jamil Mouawad highlights two other narratives. According to one, the inhabitants of Wadi Khaled did not register for the various censuses of the French Mandate for fear that their young people would be recruited into the French Army. "According to another story, the Mandate authorities deliberately excluded them from the census because of their resistance to the French colonial presence and their willingness to join the Arab Revolution. In any case, they did not obtain Lebanese nationality, except for 5% of them, who were registered in the census".

From the 1950s and 1960s, as this community gradually settled down, the deprivation of Lebanese nationality became an obstacle to access to private property for the Arabs of Wadi Khaled. They started to demand the Lebanese nationality from the State, which refused them, to the point of leading demonstrations were repressed by a bombing of the Lebanese army in 1964. If some succeeded in obtaining the status "Under study", the former Sunni deputy of Akkar, Jamil Ismail, explains that up to 2000 people held false identity papers.

The expression "Wadi Khaled Arabs" was used in 1974, when six Lebanese parliamentarians drafted a bill, rejected by the Parliament, which sought to grant them Lebanese nationality. This expression reflects the foreign character given to this population, which is not considered to be properly Lebanese, particularly because of its location on the Syrian Lebanese border, a region in which belonging to one national entity or another is difficult to establish, according to the "principle of uncertainty" that Elisabeth Picard has highlighted. The 20,000 inhabitants of Wadi Khaled were granted Lebanese nationality by the 1994 naturalization decree. Mathieu Karam, in the French-speaking Lebanese daily newspaper L'Orient-Le Jour, puts forward the figure of "about ten thousand" naturalized persons among this Sunni tribal community. Although many of them held "Qayd ad-Dars" cards, the Lebanese authorities consider that this nationality was given to them rather than returned to them.

The 1994 naturalization decree became effective for the Arabs of Wadi Khaled ten years later, in 2004. Since then, there are only "a few hundred" stateless people left in the area today, for several reasons. Despite this decree, some naturalization files were not filled out correctly by officials, or some parents were not able to register their children (when they were detained in prison for example). In addition, some people did not believe the Lebanese state representatives and politicians, and simply did not register to benefit from this decree.

===== The Bedouins of the Bekaa =====
The Bedouins in general, including those living in the Bekaa plain, have a similar profile and history to the Arabs of Wadi Khaled. Likewise, they are predominantly Sunni, and escaped the 1932 census, either out of rejection of the French colonial presence or out of fear of military service. With sedentary lifestyle and the need to buy land for their agricultural and pastoral activities, statelessness has become a real problem for these communities, such as the al-Hrouk clan or the Abu 'Eid tribe. The latter represents 40,000 to 50,000 people, 25,000 of whom live in the Bekaa, particularly around Kfar Zabad. Some members were able to obtain cards "under study" in the 1960s, before the decree of 1994 opens naturalization to thousands of Bedouins. Although some did not present themselves to the authorities, not believing them, many obtained Lebanese nationality at that time. However, the children of the Bedouins were denied Lebanese nationality, the authorities assuring them that they would be naturalized afterwards. This never happened, and today the children and grandchildren of the naturalized in 1994 find themselves in a situation of statelessness. This explains why out of the 100,000 or 150,000 Bedouins living in Lebanon today, about two-thirds do not have Lebanese nationality and are stateless.

===== The Turkmens =====
Like the Bedouins, the Turkmens have long been excluded from Lebanese nationality. This community is also relatively marginalized and neglected by the Lebanese state. These groups are mainly located in the Akkar region and in the Bekaa plain, particularly around the city of Baalbek. Thus, the Turkmen population of Nananiye, near Duris, on the outskirts of Baalbek, represents 800 individuals. All of them are Sunni Turkmen and obtained Lebanese nationality in 1994 through naturalization decree no. 5247. Many other Turkmen in the Baalbek region were only naturalized Lebanese in 1994, which explains why many Turkmen villages (Sheymiye, Nananiye, Addus, Hadidiye) are not officially registered. These villages do not legally exist in the eyes of the Lebanese State, and there are no administrative authorities like the Mukhtars.

The Turkmen community is said to represent 18,500 people in Lebanon today, according to an interview with the former Turkish ambassador to Beirut, Inan Özyildiz, while some estimates put the number as high as 30,000 or even 40,000.

There are no reports, let alone official statistics, on the number of Turkmens living in Lebanon, let alone the number of those who are still stateless. However, obtaining nationality remains a power issue to this day. In recent years, Turkey has embarked on a policy of naturalizing people of Turkish descent or origin living in Lebanon, including Turkmen. Until 2019, almost 18,000 people had applied in Lebanon to obtain Turkish nationality, and a little over 9,600 have obtained it.

Turkey, through its cooperation agency TIKA, has set up several development programs in Akkar, especially in the Turkmen villages of Kouaychra and Aydamoun, neglected by the Lebanese state, with the stated aim of clientelizing these populations with Turkish origins, and thus making them a relay of influence of its soft power diplomacy in Lebanon. This is done, for example, by providing free DNA tests that aim to prove the Turkish origins of the inhabitants of these villages, to raise awareness of their identity and resurrect their sense of ethnic belonging to Turkey.

During a visit to the port of Beirut on 8 August 2020, after the double explosion that devastated it, the Turkish Foreign Minister said that President Reycep Tayyip Erdogan wanted to give Turkish nationality to any Turkmen person who requests it. Mevlut Cavusoglu said: "We also stand in solidarity with our relatives, the Turks and Turkmen in Lebanon and around the world. We will grant Turkish citizenship to our brothers insofar as they claim to be Turks and Turkmen and express their desire to become citizens". It is not known how many stateless people there are among the Turkmen community in Lebanon today, but given the complexity and length of the Lebanese administrative procedures to obtain Lebanese citizenship, it is more than likely that they will turn to Turkish citizenship.

===== Kurds and other Muslim refugees from Anatolia =====
Several waves of populations fled Anatolia in the 1910s and 1920s, to Syria or Lebanon, which was seen as a land of welcome. This is the case of the Armenians and Assyrians who fled genocides (of Armenians, Sayfo, of Pontus Greeks), and who benefited from Article 13 of Decree No. 8837 of 15 January 1932, which states that "Refugees from Turkish territories such as Armenians, Syriacs, Chaldeans and members of the Greek Catholic and Orthodox churches, or other persons who are of Turkish origin, shall be counted as Lebanese provided that they were found in the Lebanese territories on August 30, 1924 according to Regulation 2825".

However, refugees and migrants of Muslim faith were denied the right to be counted as Lebanese citizens in the 1932 census, according to the same decree n° 8837. This is the case of the Kurds of Anatolia, mainly from the regions of Mardin and Tur Abdin, who fled the consequences of the First World War, the deteriorated economic conditions or the discrimination and persecution of the young Turkish Republic. While there were very few Kurds in Beirut in 1927 (300), their number increased sharply: 1500 in 1936 and 7000 in 1944.

The Kurds who arrived in Lebanon at that time do not form a homogeneous community. A distinction is made between the speakers of Kurmanji, who represent a third of the individuals, and the "Arab Kurds". The latter do not speak a Kurdish dialect but an Arabic dialect, they come from an area of Kurdish settlement (the region of Mardin and Tur Abdin), and they themselves have difficulty defining their identity. They call themselves Merdallis or Muhallamis. Hourani shows that these populations sometimes declare themselves to be Arabs, sometimes Kurdish, but that it is under this second name that they have been categorized and counted by the Lebanese state. It is this second group that is the most numerous in Lebanon, the proximity of the Arabic language allowing an easier integration and thus destining them more towards the country of the Cedar. The ORSAM report uses the term "Mardinites" to encompass the populations originating from the Mardin region.

Although a few Kurds obtained temporary residence cards through the Kurdish nationalist leader Kamuran Bedir Khan, then residing in Beirut, most of the community simply did not apply for Lebanese nationality, and only a minority obtained it. The majority of Kurds were registered as foreigners with "undetermined nationality" and were granted the status of "Under study" in 1962.

A second wave of Syrian Kurdish refugees arrived in Lebanon in the 1950s and 1960s, particularly after the census carried out by the Syrian Republic in 1962 in the governorate of Al-Hasakah. Between 120,000 and 150,000 Syrian Kurds were stripped of their Syrian nationality by the Damascus regime, depriving them of their basic rights, which led 50,000 of them to seek refuge in Lebanon.

Stateless Kurds were encouraged to obtain an "under-study" card in Lebanon. According to Jamil Meho, in the mid-1990s, before the 1994 naturalization decree, less than 20% of Lebanese Kurds held a nationality. About 10% had no form of Identity documentation or were registered as Syrians or Palestinians, while more than 70% of Lebanese Kurds held "Under Study" cards.

A handful of them had obtained Lebanese nationality when Kamal Jumblatt, whose family has Kurdish origins, was Minister of the Interior between 1961 and 1964, and again between 1969 and 1970. Thus, 4500 Mardinites received the nationality in 1956.

Several thousand Lebanese Kurds were naturalized by the decree of 1994, but their exact number is impossible to know. According to Hourani, 32,500 of those naturalized in 1994 carried "Under Study" cards, the status that corresponded to the vast majority of Kurds in Lebanon. But since they were not constituted or categorized as a community unto itself, it is impossible to know precisely how many Kurds were naturalized by Decree 5247. Brooke Anderson puts the number at 10,000 naturalized Kurds in 1994, while other estimates put it at 25,000 naturalized Lebanese Kurds since the 1950s. The ORSAM report goes so far as to put forward the seemingly exaggerated figure of 157,000 Lebanese nationalized Mardinites.

Estimates of the number of Kurds in Lebanon are at the center of the interests of the different political actors in Lebanon and can thus vary considerably. Jamil Meho considered that there were 70,000 Kurds in Lebanon in 1975, and even almost 100,000 in 1977, while various Lebanese newspapers gave a figure of between 15,000 and 35,000 in the 1990s, most of the population having fled the Lebanese Civil War. The UNHCR gave the number of 25,000 Kurds in 2008. There are reportedly more than 200,000, possibly more than 300,000, stateless Kurds, spread between Syria and Lebanon, according to a 2010 UNHCR report.

Approximatively 40% of Kurds in Lebanon don't have the Lebanese nationality in 2012, according to Anderson, without giving sources.

==== Statelessness and the drawing of borders in Lebanon ====
Tarbikha, Saliha, Malkiyeh, Nabi Yusha, Qadas, Hunin, and Abil al-Qamh were seven villages, in Upper Galilee, mostly populated by Shiite Muslims, located south of the "Blue Line" drawn by the UN after the withdrawal of Israeli troops from southern Lebanon in May 2000. These seven villages are part of a larger group of 24 other villages, 12 of which were predominantly Sunni, three predominantly Christian, one including Sunni and Greek Catholics, and two predominantly Jewish villages.

Following the division of the Arab Middle East after the First World War (Sykes-Picot Agreement of 1916), France and the United Kingdom divided the region into zones of influence, placed under League of Nations mandates. Syria and Lebanon were placed under French mandate, and Palestine was placed under British mandate. However, the border between these new territorial entities was not precisely delineated in the aftermath of the war. A first agreement, signed in December 1920 between France and Great Britain, placed these 24 villages within the territory of Greater Lebanon.

The population of these 24 villages, and in particular the Shiite population, was counted by the French authorities during the census of March 1921, and obtained Lebanese nationality and Lebanese identity cards. None of these seven Shiite villages is mentioned in the census conducted by the British authorities in Palestine in 1922.

The border between Mandatory Palestine and the State of Greater Lebanon was definitively fixed with the signing of the Paulet-Newcombe agreement in March 1923. The 24 villages, which had been placed in the territory of Greater Lebanon in 1920, were this time considered as belonging to the territory of Mandatory Palestine. The residents of these villages retained their Lebanese nationality until 1926, when they lost it and obtained Palestinian nationality as residents of the British mandate.

During the first Arab Israeli war of 1948, the residents of the seven Shiite villages were forced into exile, and a majority fled to southern Lebanon. These residents were counted as Palestinian refugees when they were received in Lebanon, and were therefore prevented from acquiring Lebanese nationality, despite their claims, throughout the 1950s and 1960s. The Lebanese state feared that these refugees would settle permanently on its territory, thus endangering the confessional balance of the country, and guaranteed their "right to return" to their lands in Palestine. However, some of the former inhabitants of the seven villages have registered with UNRWA to obtain assistance from this UN organization.

The debate on the naturalization of the former inhabitants of the seven villages and their descendants continued during the Lebanese Civil War. The majority of these people being Shiites, the naturalization project was carried by political formations and Shiite militias, such as the Amal Movement during the Lausanne Conference of 1984.

Finally, the naturalization decree of 1994 granted Lebanese nationality to 35,000 Palestinians, among whom were a majority of the inhabitants of the seven villages and their descendants, particularly because of the historical attachment of these villages to Greater Lebanon. The former inhabitants of the seven villages and their descendants represent about 15% of the people who were naturalized through the 1994 decree. According to some estimates, about ten thousand Palestinians from the seven Shiite villages and their descendants were naturalized by this decree, some others give the number of 27 000 naturalized Shi'a residents of the seven villages.

=== A phenomenon that is still present ===
In Tripoli, and more particularly in Sunni families, the non-registration of marriages (often linked to other phenomena such as forced child marriage, divorce and successive marriages, or polygamy), has been identified as one of the main causes of non-registration of births. For example, many Sunni marriages are performed before the sheikh, but are not officially registered in a Sunni Islamic court or at the personal status office. Without official proof of their marriage, registration of the children born of this marriage becomes impossible, rendering them de facto stateless.

Lebanese women, except for very rare situations that are never put into practice by the Lebanese authorities, do not have the right to pass on their nationality to their children. When they are married to a non-Lebanese, foreign or stateless man, the children born from these marriages cannot acquire Lebanese nationality. This factor is one of the many phenomena that tend to make some children stateless in Lebanon.

A 2009 study by Fahima Charafeddine estimates that 18,000 marriages were contracted between Lebanese women and non-Lebanese men between 1995 and 2008. Approximately 40,000 children were born of these marriages, and are therefore at significant risk of statelessness. While this report does not specifically mention marriages between Lebanese women and stateless men, it does provide an indication of the magnitude of the problem created by gender inequality and discrimination in the 1925 nationality law. It highlights that the denial of this right to Lebanese mothers makes their children foreigners in their own country. Approximately 77,000 people (including spouses and children) would be directly and negatively affected by these discriminations contained in the 1925 law.

Although a child born to a Lebanese father is normally and automatically recognized as Lebanese, regardless of his place of birth, for the child's Lebanese nationality to be recognized, if he was born outside of Lebanon, his birth must be registered in a Lebanese embassy. This adds administrative and formal barriers, and therefore creates an additional risk of statelessness.

Denaturalization is authorized in the Lebanese legislation, and framed by Article 8 of Decree 15/S of 19 January 1925, which defines the conditions. It makes it a prerogative of the Head of State, who "may deprive an individual of the Lebanese nationality he was granted by decree if he has subsequently acquired another nationality, if he is convicted of "a crime against the security of the State" or if he is "a member of an association that has plotted or attempted to undermine the security of the State. It can also revoke the Lebanese nationality of a Lebanese who accepts a position in Lebanon entrusted by a foreign government without prior authorization from the Lebanese government".

Two decrees in 2011, signed by the President of the Republic Michel Suleiman, deprived several dozen individuals of their Lebanese nationality. These individuals were registered as Palestinian refugees with UNRWA, or were of known nationality (Syrians, Egyptians, Iranians, Turks, Armenians), while the 1994 decree provided for the granting of Lebanese nationality only to persons whose nationality was undetermined.

=== Attempts at reform ===
The creation of the "Under study" status by the General Security services in the early 1960s can be seen as an attempt to address the issue of statelessness in Lebanon. However, because of the complexity of this status, and its neglect which left thousands of people without an improvement in their status for decades, this attempt at reform actually made the statelessness situation in Lebanon even more complex.

The 1994 naturalization decree was also an attempt to naturalize tens of thousands of stateless people. However, this "mass" naturalization was largely instrumentalized for political and electoral purposes, in anticipation of the 1996 parliamentary elections, granting Lebanese citizenship to people who already had a nationality (Syrians in particular), and keeping thousands of others stateless. This decree was opposed by the Maronite League before the Court of Cassation, which brought even more complexity.

"My nationality is a right for my family and for me" is a regional campaign launched in 1999 by the Collective for Research & Training on Development – Action. It aims to mobilize public opinion in several Arab countries, including Lebanon, about the legal inequality affecting women in some countries, including their prohibition to pass their nationality to their children.

In 2009, the court of first instance in Mount Lebanon validated the naturalization of the child of a Lebanese woman. She was married to an Egyptian man who died without registering the child's birth. The court did not recognize the right of Lebanese women to pass their nationality to their children, however it appealed to several arguments in this sense: "The Lebanese woman is a partner to man in citizenship, obligations and rights, and has therefore the right to give her nationality to her children if she marries a foreigner, strengthening thereby the children's attachment to their mother country, securing the unity of the family's citizenship, facilitating the belonging of the family and its living together in the country".

Stateless children have a much lower level of education than children with Lebanese citizenship, partly because they are unable to sit for official exams as they do not have Identity documents. Thus, many leave schools before the 9th grade, which corresponds to the Brevet exam. In 2014, the Lebanese Ministry of Education proclaimed the right of stateless children to sit for this exam, by presenting a ta'arif card from the Mukhtar and an authorization from the Ministry of Education. However, MARCH's report shows that many stateless families, and even Mukhtars, are not informed of this measure, which does not encourage them to send stateless children to school.

=== Lebanon's international commitments ===
Lebanon is a signatory to several international conventions and commitments concerning statelessness.

Lebanon is a signatory to the Universal Declaration of Human Rights of 1948. This text states in its article 15 that "Everyone has the right to a nationality. No one shall be arbitrarily deprived of his nationality nor denied the right to change his nationality".

Lebanon has neither signed nor ratified the 1954 United Nations Convention relating to the Status of Stateless Persons. Yet this text provides an international definition of statelessness and proclaims the fundamental rights of stateless persons.

Lebanon has also neither signed nor ratified the 1961 UN Convention on the Reduction of Statelessness.

Lebanon has not signed or ratified the 1957 Convention on the Nationality of Married Women, which protects women from statelessness in the event of a change in their marital status.

Lebanon has signed and ratified the 1966 International Covenant on Civil and Political Rights, Article 24 of which states that "Every child shall be registered immediately after birth and shall have a name. Every child shall have the right to acquire a nationality".

Lebanon has signed the 1979 Convention on the Elimination of All Forms of Discrimination Against Women, however it has not ratified its articles 9, on the transmission of nationality, and 16 (c, d, f, and g) concerning the elimination of discrimination against women during marriage and divorce.

Lebanon has signed and ratified the 1989 United Nations Convention on the Rights of the Child. Its article 7 states that "The child shall be registered immediately after birth and shall have the right from birth to a name, the right to acquire a nationality and, as far as possible, the right to know and be cared for by his or her parents".

Lebanon has neither signed nor ratified the 2006 United Nations Convention on the Rights of Persons with Disabilities, Article 18 of which states that "Every child born with a disability has the right to a nationality".

Lebanon has signed but not ratified the Organization of Islamic Cooperation's Covenant on the Rights of the Child in Islam (2005), Article 7 of which calls on signatory states to make efforts to reduce statelessness.

== Statelessness in a migratory context ==
=== Palestinian refugees in Lebanon ===
Following the creation of the State of Israel, more than 700,000 Palestinian fled the first Arab Israeli war, and about 130,000 took refuge in Lebanon between 1948 and 1949. 25% of them were Christians, mostly Greek Catholic and Orthodox. Some 6500 of them obtained Lebanese nationality shortly after their arrival, thanks to the nationality law of 15 June 1946 on persons of "Lebanese origin".

The number of Palestinians who obtained Lebanese nationality is unknown, estimates vary between 3000 and 50,000, mainly Christian Palestinians, of Armenian origin or members of the bourgeoisie, including Muslims.

Decree No. 319 of 2 August 1962 considers Palestinian refugees as "foreigners of special category" who do not carry identification documents issued by their country of origin.

Despite the lack of clear and reliable statistics, and despite the Lebanese government's denial, several Lebanese media reported that up to 40,000 Palestinian refugees were naturalized Lebanese as a result of the 1994 decree.

There are several categories of Palestinian refugees in Lebanon: those who have been registered with UNRWA in Lebanon; those who have been granted Lebanese nationality by the Lebanese authorities (notably through the 1994 decree); those who have been registered with the UNRWA in another country and then moved to Lebanon; and those who have not been registered with either UNRWA or the Lebanese authorities, and who therefore have no recognized legal status in the country.

Between 3,000 and 5,000 Palestinian refugees who arrived in Lebanon in the 1960s have not been registered with either UNRWA in Lebanon or with the Lebanese authorities.

The Lebanese state refuses to grant Lebanese nationality to Palestinian refugees, for fear of an imbalance in the demographic and confessional balance of the country (they are mostly Sunni Muslims), and to guarantee them the right to return to their lands in occupied Palestine (Casablanca Protocol). It is for the same reason, according to some speeches, that the Lebanese nationality law prohibits Lebanese women from passing it on to their children. This law would prevent the granting of Lebanese nationality to the children of a Palestinian father, although it can be highlighted that it was passed in 1925, well before the Nakba. However, marriages between Palestinian men and women of another nationality are very rare in Lebanon (only 3700 households fall into this category according to a 2016 survey).

=== Iraqi refugees ===
Following the 2003 U.S. invasion, tens of thousands of Iraqi refugees fled their country for Lebanon. In 2007, the U.S. Committee for Refugees and Immigrants estimated their number to be between 20,000 and 40,000, with other estimates putting the number higher. 40 000 is the number given by the Beirut office of the UNHCR, while security officials from the Lebanese Ministry of Internal Affairs believe it is closer to 100 000 in 2007. "Fewer than 10 percent of Iraqis arriving in Lebanon actually register with UNHCR, according to Carole El Sayed, assistant community services officer for UNHCR Beirut", therefore Iraqi refugees in Lebanon are considered as illegal.

Like any population forced into exile, Iraqi refugees are at risk of statelessness: loss, theft or destruction of their Identity documents during their flight, inability to return to their country, non-registration of the birth of children born outside Iraq, etc. However, in a 2007 survey, the Danish Refugee Council showed most of the Iraqi refugees in Lebanon could prove their identity with Iraqi identification documents.

With the outbreak of the second Iraqi civil war, and the rapid territorial conquest of the Islamic State in Iraq, many persecuted Christian populations found refuge in Lebanon. They were added to the Iraqi refugees already settled in the Cedar country, and are also at risk of statelessness.

=== Syrian refugee crisis ===
Since the beginning of the Syrian civil war, Lebanon has become one of the main refugee destinations for people fleeing the conflict. At the height of the crisis, Lebanon hosted as many as one million to one and a half million Syrian refugees. With the crisis now more than a decade old, many children of refugee parents have been born in Lebanon. Syrian refugees have one year to register the birth of their children in Lebanon, after which time birth registration procedures become extremely complicated and lengthy. As a result, they are at risk of becoming stateless. Many Syrian parents do not register their children's births in Lebanon, either because they are not aware of the country's registration system or because they are afraid to contact the authorities and be sent back to Syria. It is even more complicated for Syrian refugees who entered Lebanon illegally.

As in the Lebanese law, only the father can give the Syrian nationality to his children. Thus, children born to a Syrian mother but whose father is absent, dead or stateless himself, are at risk of statelessness, since the mother cannot pass on her nationality. In Lebanon, an estimated 20% of Syrian refugee households are headed by women, where the father is not present.

In a survey of Syrian refugees in Lebanon in January 2015, the Norvegian Refugee Council (NRC) estimated that 92% of refugees were unable to register the birth of their children. Only 23% of Syrian refugees over the age of 14 in Lebanon had Identity documents, because their documents were lost, destroyed or confiscated during the war in Syria, or at the time of their flight to Lebanon.

More than 80% of Syrian children under the age of five living in Lebanon are not registered in family booklets. Another NRC study found that out of 1706 Syrian refugees who had married in Lebanon, only 206 had obtained a marriage certificate, and even fewer had fully registered their marriage with the Lebanese government.

In a 2014 survey conducted by UNHCR, out of 5779 Syrian newborns in Lebanon, 70% had no official birth certificate. There could be as many as 50,000 unregistered children in Lebanon. In 2016, a UNHCR official estimated that there were 100,000 Syrian newborns at risk of becoming stateless in Lebanon.

Since 2011, the Lebanese Ministry of Interior has facilitated birth registration procedures for Syrian children born on Lebanese soil, eliminating court proceedings and the need for DNA testing as proof of parentage, but proof of marriage remains mandatory. These new procedures apply to Syrian refugees, PRS (Palestinian Refugees from Syria), but not to Palestinian children who are more than one year old.

In addition to the problem of the non-registration of Syrian refugees' marriages in Lebanon and the births of newborns, one must consider the populations who were already stateless in Syria before the beginning of the civil war and who fled to Lebanon. According to the UNHCR, about 0.2% of registered Syrian refugees in Lebanon are stateless, which may involve thousands of people, although this percentage is certainly underestimated.

About 160,000 stateless people were still living in Syria at the end of 2015, among whom were many Kurds. They are divided into two categories: the "Ajanib" registered as foreigners, and the "Maktoumeen", not registered in the 1962 census, following their deprivation of Syrian nationality. There are no official figures or even surveys or censuses of stateless refugees from Syria living in Lebanon, however several stateless Syrian Kurds have entered Iraq, Turkey and Lebanon.

In Syria, as in Lebanon, there are families of "Maktoumeen", who have never been registered in Syria for generations. These people had escaped the censuses to avoid military service at the time, and their statelessness was passed on from generation to generation.

The Syrian stateless include PRS (some of whom are not registered with either UNRWA or UNHCR), who have no nationality, or individuals whose births were never registered in Syria, and who therefore have no identity papers. The number of PRS arriving in Lebanon in recent years is estimated at 45,000, 52,000 or 97,000 individuals.

PRS who fled Syria and whose children were born in Lebanon must register their births with UNRWA offices in Syria, which can be extremely complicated and/or dangerous for them, thus increasing the risk of non-registration and statelessness.

=== Foreign workers and statelessness ===
Until 2019–2020 (the unprecedented economic and financial crisis that has hit Lebanon since then has caused many of them to leave), Lebanon hosted up to 250,000 foreign domestic workers, recruited through the Kafala system. Most of them come from Ethiopia, the Indian subcontinent (Pakistan, Bangladesh) or the Philippines. These workers, mostly women, find themselves in particularly precarious situations and are subjected to systematic violations of their human rights. In particular, their Passports are confiscated by their employers, who can fire them and send them back without giving them back, which poses a major risk of statelessness.

The Lebanese-born children of these migrant workers are also more vulnerable to non-registration of their births, and thus more at risk of statelessness, although no figures on their numbers are available.

== In the culture ==
In his 2015 novel, The American Neighborhood, Lebanese writer Jabbour Douaihy describes a Bedouin family from the Akkar plain who have lived in the "confidential status" category since 1932.

A "Day of the Stateless Child" is celebrated every 25 February in Lebanon since 2016, by decision of the Ministry of Social Affairs. This national day aims to raise awareness among the population and government services about the issues related to statelessness in the country.

== See also ==
- Constitution of Lebanon
- History of Lebanon
- Lebanese identity card
- Lebanese passport
- Politics of Lebanon
- Statelessness
- Lebanese nationality law
- 2025 Syrian refugee return plan (Lebanon)
