= Snake Party =

Snake Party حزب الأفعى
- Founded: 2003-Present
- Preceded by: Arab Socialist Ba'ath Party – Iraq Region
- Ideology: Ba'athism; Saddamism

Snake Party (also called Snake's Head Movement or Harakat Ras Al Afa) is composed substantially of former Ba'ath Party and Saddam Hussein loyalists that are engaged in the Iraqi insurgency. This group originated from the Ba’ath Party in Hawija and aspired to be a political party to oppose the multinational forces' presence in Iraq. Some have alleged that the party has links to tribes around Fallujah and Ramadi. Al-Ahram reported in 2003 that the organization was one of several that target those who collaborate with occupation forces.
