= Palestinians in Jordan =

Palestinian refugees and naturalized citizens of Jordan

Regions with significant populations
- Amman, Zarqa, Irbid, Jerash and Balqa governorates

Languages
- Arabic

Religion
- Islam and Christianity

Palestinians in Jordan refers mainly to those with Palestinian refugee status currently residing there. Sometimes the definition includes Jordanian citizens with full Palestinian origin. Most Palestinian ancestors came to Jordan as Palestinian refugees between 1947 and 1967. Today, most Palestinians and their descendants in Jordan are naturalized, making Jordan the only Arab country to fully integrate the Palestinian refugees of 1948, as the West Bank was annexed and held by Jordan between 1948 and 1967.

== Population ==
In Jordan, there is no official census data for how many inhabitants are Palestinians and it rather depends on the definition of who is a Palestinian. Some 2.18 million Palestinians were registered as refugees in 2016. As of 2014, around 370,000 live in ten refugee camps, with the biggest one being Baqa'a refugee camp with over 104,000 residents, followed by Al-Wehdat refugee camp with over 51,500 residents. Minority Rights Group International estimated that there are around 3 million Palestinians in Jordan.

Palestinians are overwhelmingly concentrated in northern and central Jordan, specifically in the Amman Governorate, Zarqa Governorate and Irbid Governorate.

== Notable people ==
This is a list of notable Palestinians in Jordan and people of Palestinian ancestry:

- Anwar Nusseibeh, politician
- Ahmad Toukan, politician
- Amer Shafi, footballer
- Emad Hajjaj, cartoonist
- Hassan Abdel-Fattah, footballer
- Ibrahim Nasrallah, poet and novelist
- Princess Firyal of Jordan, princess
- Samir al-Rifai, politician
- Queen Alia of Jordan, third wife of King Hussein
- Queen Rania of Jordan, wife of King Abdullah II
- Hanan Al-Agha, plastic artist
- Eyad Nassar, actor
- Musa Al-Taamari, football player
- Zeid Hijazi, fashion designer
- Zeyne, singer

== See also ==
- Refugees of the Syrian civil war in Jordan
- Demographics of Jordan
- 1948 Palestinian expulsion and flight
- 1967 Palestinian exodus
- Jordanian annexation of the West Bank
- King Hussein's federation plan
- Three-state solution
- Black September
- Palestinians in Egypt
- Palestinians in Iraq
- Palestinians in Lebanon
- Palestinians in Syria
- Palestinians in Jordan

== Bibliography ==
- Gandolfo, Luisa (24 December 2012). Palestinians in Jordan: The Politics of Identity. I. B. Tauris. ISBN 978-1-78076-095-7.
- Massad, Joseph (26 May 2009). "Producing the Palestinian as Other: Jordan and the Palestinians". In Roger Heacock (ed.). Temps et espaces en Palestine: Flux et résistances identitaires. Presses de l’Ifpo. ISBN 978-2-35159-212-0. Full text at
- Sayigh Yusuf, 1984, Al-Urdunn wa-l-Filastiniyyun, Dirasah fi Wihdat al-Masir aw al-Sira’ al-Hatmi (Arabic), London, Riyad El-Rayyis Books
