= Casablanca Protocol =

1965 instrument on Palestinian refugees

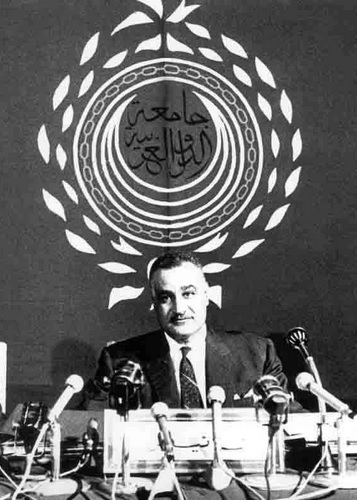
Gamal Abdul Nasser, then the de facto leader of the Arab world, addressing 1965 Casablanca Summit of the Arab League

The Casablanca Protocol, formally the Protocol for the Treatment of Palestinians in Arab States, was a statement by the Arab League on 11 September 1965, made at the 1965 Arab League summit in Casablanca, Morocco. The statement, in five articles, sought to regularize the legal protections for Palestinian refugees residing in the countries of the Arab World.

Although focused on refugees, the protocol does not use the term, referring only to "Palestinians"; this was apparently intended to align the treatment of those Palestinians who did not gain the status of refugee under UNRWA.

The Protocol was intended to regulate Palestinians' right to work on par with citizens of the states in which they live, and their freedom of movement (i.e. their right to leave and to return, and the issuance of travel documents).

Although it is the only "binding" instrument of the Arab League addressing the status of Palestinian refugees, its implementation was inconsistent, and it was effectively revoked in 1991.

== Context ==
In the years following the Palestinian Nakba, most Arab states granted Palestinian refugees a number of basic human rights such as the right to work and the right of abode on par with their citizens. These rights were implemented inconsistently and with frequent change, both between the different states and under different governments over time. The Casablanca Protocol was an attempt to standardize this treatment, but in practice it has had limited impact.

== Text ==
The English language text of the protocol is as follows, with the ellipsis intended to be replaced with the name of the each signatory country. Note the term "LAS" is the formal acronym for the Arab League (i.e. the "League of Arab States"):

On the basis of the Charter of the League of Arab States and its special annex pertaining to Palestine, and of the LAS Council resolution concerning the Palestinian issue, and, in particular, of the Special resolution pertaining to safeguarding Palestinian existence,

The Council of Foreign Ministers of Member states agreed, in its meeting in Casablanca on 10 September 1965, upon the following regulations, and called upon member states to take the necessary measures to put them into the sphere of implementation:

(1) Whilst retaining their Palestinian nationality, Palestinians currently residing in the land of ...... have the right of employment on par with its citizens.

(2) Palestinians residing at the moment in ...... in accordance with the dictates of their interests, have the right to leave and return to this state.

(3) Palestinians residing in other Arab states have the right to enter the land of ...... and to depart from it, in accordance with their interests. Their right of entry only gives them the right to stay for the permitted period and for the purpose they entered for, so long as the authorities do not agree to the contrary.

(4) Palestinians who are at the moment in ......, as well as those who were residing and left to the Diaspora, are given, upon request, valid travel documents. The concerned authorities must, wherever they be, issue these documents or renew them without delay.

(5) Bearers of these travel documents residing in LAS states receive the same treatment as all other LAS state citizens, regarding visa, and residency applications.

== Signatories ==
The states which supported the protocol without reservation are:

- Jordan
- Algeria
- Sudan
- Iraq
- Syria
- Egypt
- North Yemen

Three states supported the protocol with reservations:

- Lebanon: three reservations
  - Article One: Palestinians residing at the moment in Lebanon are granted the right of employment, together with the right of keeping their Palestinian nationality, in accordance with prevailing social and economic conditions in the Republic of Lebanon.
  - Article Two: that the phrase: "on equal terms with the Lebanese citizens and in accordance with the laws and regulations in operation" be added.
  - Article Three: that the phrases "(whenever their interests demand it)" and "allowing Palestinians into Lebanon is conditional upon their obtaining an entry visa issued by the concerned Lebanese authorities" be added.
- Kuwait: reservation that Article One excludes the right of private business / self employment work on par with Kuwaiti citizens
- Libya: reservation regarding Article One "since dealing with Palestinian citizens residing in Libya is on par with and equal to dealing with other Arab citizens residing in Libya."

Three states have not yet approved the protocol:

- Saudi Arabia
- Morocco
- Tunisia

Nine states joined the Arab League after the signing of the protocol and have not clarified their position on it:

- South Yemen, 12 December 1967 (joining the Arab League)
- Bahrain, 11 September 1971 (joining the Arab League)
- Qatar, 11 September 1971 (joining the Arab League)
- Oman, 29 September 1971 (joining the Arab League)
- UAE, 6 December 1971 (joining the Arab League)
- Mauritania, 26 November 1973 (joining the Arab League)
- Somalia, 14 February 1974 (joining the Arab League)
- Palestine, 9 September 1976 (joining the Arab League)
- Djibouti, 4 September 1977 (joining the Arab League)

== See also ==
- Palestinians in Egypt
- Palestinians in Jordan
- Palestinians in Iraq
- Palestinians in Lebanon
- Palestinians in Syria
- Palestinians in Jordan

== Bibliography ==
- Albanese, Francesca P.; Takkenberg, Lex (2020). "IV. The Status of Palestinian Refugees in the Middle East and North Africa: Unpacking an Unsettling Solidarity". Palestinian Refugees in International Law. OUP Oxford. ISBN 978-0-19-108678-6.
- Shiblak, Abbas (1996). "Residency Status and Civil Rights of Palestinian Refugees in Arab Countries". Journal of Palestine Studies. 25 (3). [University of California Press, Institute for Palestine Studies]: 36–45. doi:10.2307/2538257. ISSN 0377-919X. JSTOR 2538257.
- Salahi, Reem (26 November 2019). "Reinterpreting Article ID: Seeking Viable Solutions to the Palestinian Refugee Anomaly" (PDF). Berkeley Journal of Middle Eastern & Islamic Law. 1 (1): 143 ff.
- Pepijn van Houwelingen, 2011, “Refugeeism” and the Two-State Solution, Volume: 3, Issue: 6, page 103 ff
- Khalil, A. (30 October 2011). "Socioeconomic Rights of Palestinian Refugees in Arab Countries" (PDF). International Journal of Refugee Law. 23 (4). Oxford University Press (OUP): 680–719. doi:10.1093/ijrl/eer027. ISSN 0953-8186.
