= Al-Waleed (camp) =

Palestinian refugee camp in Iraq

Al-Waleed مخيم الوليد
- Refugee camp
- Interactive map of Al-Waleed
- Coordinates: 33°25′42″N 38°56′22″E
- Country: Iraq
- Governorate: Anbar
- Established: 2006

Population (2008)
  - Total: 1,649

Al-Waleed (Arabic: مخيم الوليد) is a makeshift Palestinian refugee camp in Iraq, near the border with Syria and the al-Tanf Crossing, and not far from the border with Jordan. It was set up in 2006 by Iraqi-Palestinian and Iraqi refugees stranded at the Iraqi–Syrian border. The United Nations High Commissioner for Refugees has two field staff stationed in the camp. In 2008, it had a population of 1,649 refugees, 1,602 of whom were Palestinians and the remainders Iraqis.

Since March 2006, a steady flow of Palestinians has been leaving Baghdad. People arrive at al-Waleed camp on a regular basis and most come from lower socio-economic backgrounds. Last year, the Iraqi Ministry of Displacement and Migration called on all Palestinians at al-Waleed to return to their homes in Baghdad, promising them financial compensation, assistance and protection. However, the ultimate goal of the camp's residents is to get out of Iraq as soon as possible without getting hurt. In 2008 and 2009, 375 people left for resettlement in Iceland, the UK, the US, Denmark, France, the Netherlands and Norway.

Al-Waleed suffers from poor hygiene and an absence of medical care amid extreme weather conditions. Children, women and the elderly have died due to the lack of adequate health care. The nearest hospital is a four-hour drive away along a dangerous route. The tents are overcrowded and many residents have chronic respiratory ailments, high blood pressure, diabetes and heart problems. Tents fill with water when it rains, and temperatures can fall below freezing in the winter. In the summer, temperatures above 50 degrees Celsius have been recorded, while sandstorms, fires, snakes and scorpions all present dangers. With no sewage system, waste water runs openly through the camp, leading to a higher occurrence of disease and infections among children who play between the tents.

Despite the closure of al-Tanf camp on February 1, 2010, and the resettlement of approximately 1,000 Palestinians to third countries, al-Waleed continues to host close to 1,300 Palestinian refugees.
