= Saddamism =

Ba'athist political ideology of Saddam Hussein

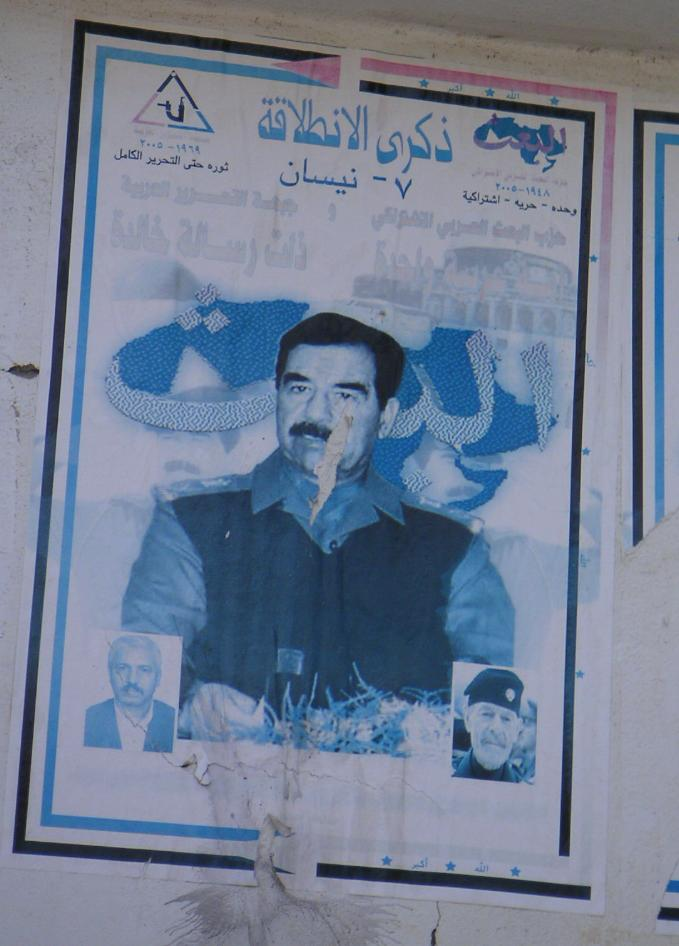
Iraqi Ba'athist poster showing Saddam Hussein in the middle of the poster, a map of a pan-Arab state, and the flags of the Ba'ath Party and Iraq during the Ba'athist era along the border of the poster.

Saddamism (Arabic: صدامية, romanized: Ṣaddāmiyah), also known as Saddamist Ba'athism (Arabic: البعثية الصدامية, romanized: al-Baʿthīyah as-Ṣaddāmiyah), is a Ba'athist political ideology based on the political ideas and thinking of Saddam Hussein, who served as the president of Iraq from 1979 to 2003. It espouses Arab nationalism, Arab socialism and Pan-Arabism, as well as an Iraq-centred Arab world that calls upon Arab countries to adopt Saddamist political discourse and reject "the Nasserist discourse" that it claims collapsed following the Six-Day War in 1967. It is militarist and views political disputes and conflict in a military manner as "battles" requiring "fighting", "mobilization", "battlefields", "bastions", and "trenches". Saddamism was officially supported by Saddam Hussein's government and the ruling Iraqi Arab Socialist Ba'ath Party and promoted by the Iraqi daily newspaper Babil owned by Saddam's son Uday Hussein.

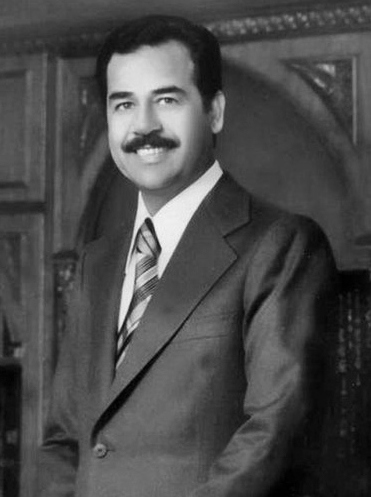
Saddam Hussein in 1980

Saddamism has often been described as an authoritarian and totalitarian ideology that aimed to control all aspects of Iraqi life, and has been accused by critics of incorporating "Sunni Arab nationalism, confused Stalinism, and fascist zeal for the fatherland and its leader", as well as enabling Saddam to generate a cult of personality revolving around him. However, the applicability of these labels has been contested. Saddamism's right-wing nature contributed to the inter-Ba'athist rivalry with the left-wing neo-Ba'athists and the Assad family who held power in Ba'athist Syria.

== Etymology ==
The term "Saddamism" (Saddamiyyah) was coined by the Iraqi media, embodying Saddam Hussein's special leadership qualities and the strong connections between him and the people.

== Tenets ==
=== Ba'athism ===
Saddam Hussein based his political views and ideology upon the views of Michel Aflaq, Ba'athism's key founder. Saddam Hussein was also an avid reader of topics on moral and material forces in international politics. Saddam Hussein's government was critical of orthodox Marxism and opposed the Marxist concepts of class conflict, dictatorship of the proletariat, and atheism, as well the Marxist-Leninist claim that non-Marxist-Leninist parties are automatically bourgeois in nature – claiming that the Ba'ath Party is a popular revolutionary movement and that as such the people rejected petit bourgeois politics.

Saddam Hussein claimed that the Arab nation did not have the class structure of that of other nations and that class division was more along national lines between Arabs and non-Arabs than within the Arab community. However, he spoke fondly of Lenin and commended him for giving Russian Marxism a uniquely Russian specificity that Marx alone was incapable of doing. He also expressed admiration for other communist leaders, such as Fidel Castro, Ho Chi Minh, and Josip Broz Tito due to their spirit of asserting national independence rather than their communism.

=== Arab nationalism ===
Saddam Hussein and his ideologists sought to fuse a connection between ancient Babylonian and Assyrian civilization in Iraq to the Arab nationalism by claiming that the Babylonians and ancient Assyrians are the ancestors of the Arabs. Thus, Saddam Hussein and his supporters claim that there is no conflict between Mesopotamian heritage and Arab nationalism.

Saddam portrayed Iraq as the bulwark of the Arab world against Iranian expansion during the Iran–Iraq War from 1980 to 1988. With the support of other Arab states, particularly the Gulf states, Saddam had become "the defender of the Arab world" against a revolutionary, fundamentalist, and Shia Islamist expansionist Iran. Jordan and the Gulf states recognized Saddam as the defender of Arab nationalism. To prevent Iraqi Shias from adopting Khomeinism and joining their co-religionists in Iran, Saddam laid more emphasis on the Arab character of Iraq as opposed to the Persian character of the Iranians.

=== Arab socialism ===
The ruling Ba'ath Party during Saddam's rule was officially Arab socialist. Despite this, Saddam's socialism was described by Israeli-British historian Efraim Karsh as "nothing but a patchy populism, combining a tightly-controlled state economy with a measure of free enterprise", with the alleged goal of strengthening his own political position.

=== Islamism ===
Saddam was a prominent advocate of Arab-Islamic nationalism. During the Iran–Iraq War, Saddam emphasized his sharifian descent to draw on a classical form of religious legitimacy. Saddam supported the Islamist uprising in Syria from 1980 to 1982 and supplied the insurgent Muslim Brotherhood with a steady flow of arms and supplies.

In June 1993, Saddam initiated the Faith Campaign, under the supervision of Izzat Ibrahim al-Douri. This new policy aimed to promote Islamism and encourage popular devotion to Islam within Iraqi society. This has been described as a Ba'athist "full-scale politicisation of Islam" and marked a shift away from the more secular rule of the 1980s and 1970s. The campaign granted greater freedoms to Islamist groups, allocated more resources into religious programmes, increased use of Islamic punishments, and a greater emphasis being put on Islam in all sectors of Iraqi life, although maintaining the Arab nationalism.

== Saddamist policies ==
=== Economic and social policy ===
According to Phebe Marr, Saddam "provided widespread health, education, and social benefits that went well beyond those of any previous regime". Saddam implemented land reform, made hospitals and education free, doubled the number of students in schools and developed infrastructure such as roads, access to electricity and water, in addition to increasing life expectancy and decreasing child mortality.

Saddam imposed tariffs and protected domestic industries. He also sponsored industrialization programs. Oil proceeds increased from $1 billion in 1972 to $33 billion in 1980. Following the Iraqi invasion of Kuwait and the ensuing Gulf War in 1991, the United Nations imposed sanctions on Iraq. This caused extreme economic decline as Iraq's GDP declined from $66.2 billion in 1989 to $10.8 billion in 1996 while per capita annual income decreased from $3,510 in 1989 to $450 in 1996.

Saddam introduced social security programs such as disability benefits which granted disabled people financial assistance. He also introduced healthcare coverage to ensure that Iraqi citizens had access to healthcare and medication when needed. Healthcare worsened in the 1990s due to the UN sanctions restricting basic-medical equipment and supplies from getting into Iraq. The UN sanctions are believed to have inflicted about 500,000 Iraqi deaths due to the shortages in food and medicine caused by the blockade.

Saddam Hussein invested heavily in infrastructure projects, such as roads, bridges, and public buildings. This contributed to the modernization of Iraqi cities and improved the overall infrastructure of Iraq. Saddam placed an emphasis on improving access to education and healthcare. The government invested in building schools and hospitals, and literacy rates in Iraq increased significantly. Saddam implemented policies aimed at advancing women's rights in Iraq.

=== Support for the Palestinian cause ===
Saddam also was a staunch supporter of the Palestinian nationalism. Saddam Hussein sheltered and supported several Palestinian guerrilla and militant organizations, such as the Palestine Liberation Organization, the Palestinian Liberation Front, the Arab Liberation Front and the Abu Nidal Organization. Additionally, he subsidized the families of Palestinian suicide bombers who died as shuhada during the Second Intifada. In April 2002, Saddam increased the money offered to Palestinian families of martyrs from $10,000 to $25,000. West Bank representative who was handing out money to Palestinian families, Mahmoud Besharat, reportedly said "You would have to ask President Saddam why he is being so generous. But he is a revolutionary and he wants this distinguished struggle, the intifada, to continue".

In April 1990, Saddam threatened to destroy half of Israel with chemical weapons if it moved against Iraq. In 1991, Saddam ordered a missile campaign against Israel. Iraq fired 42 Scud missiles into Israeli territory, primarily Tel Aviv and Haifa, amid the Gulf War. The attacks killed between 11 and 74 Israelis. Israel did not retaliate against Iraq due to pressure exerted by the United States.

Saddam remains a heroic figure in the West Bank and Gaza Strip, whose residents remember him as an Arab leader who was prepared to challenge the United States and Israel. In the Arab world, Saddam is well regarded, especially for his support of the Palestinian cause. A memorial dedicated to Saddam was built in Qalqilya, and many portraits and other forms of memorials are found throughout Palestine. He remains widely known for his commitment to the Palestinian cause and his anti-Zionist stance. In 2001, Saddam said on Iraqi television:

Palestine is Arab and must be liberated from the river to the sea and all the Zionists who emigrated to the land of Palestine must leave.

— Saddam Hussein

=== Cult of personality ===
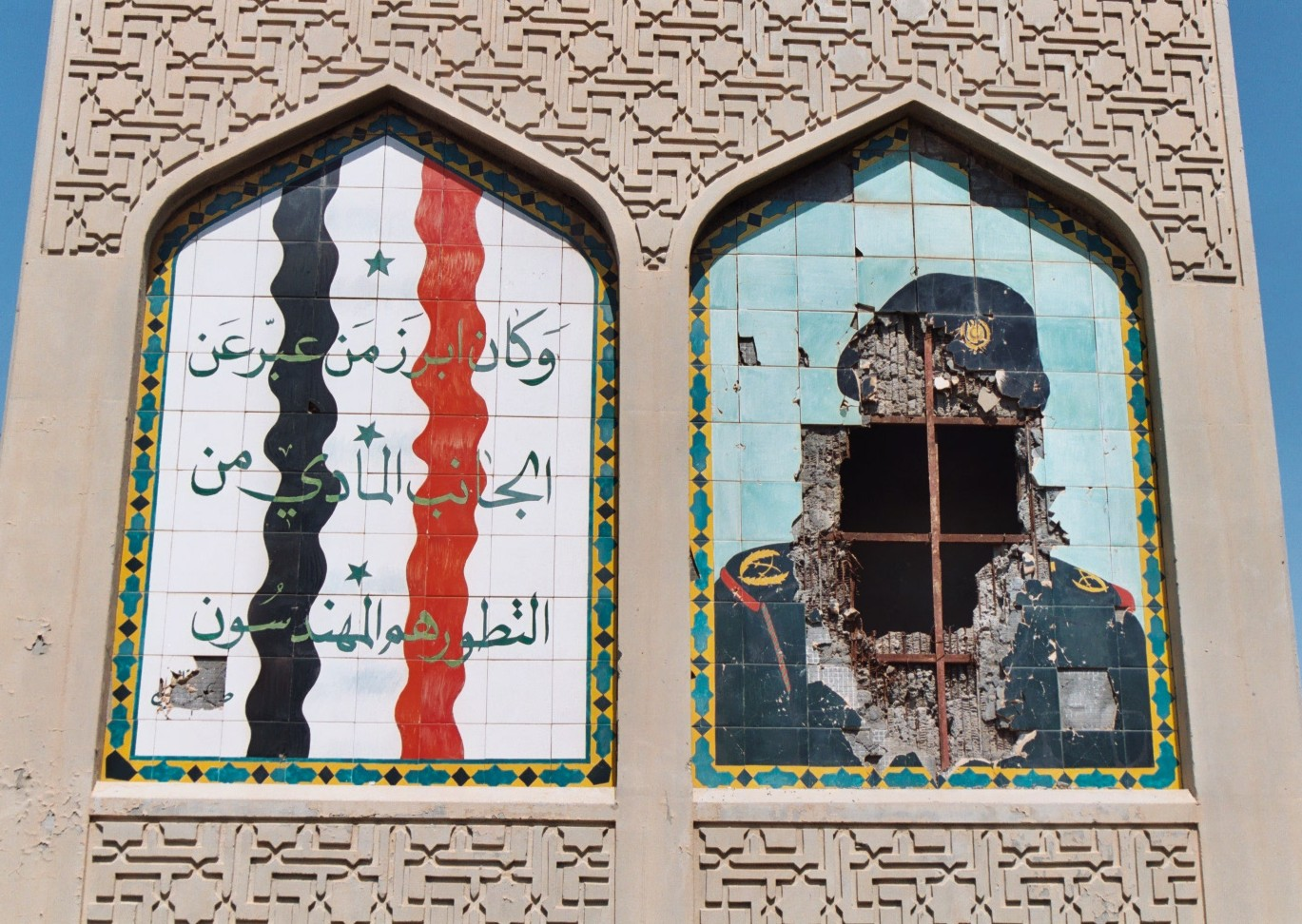
Mural of Saddam Hussein demolished by Coalition forces during the Iraq War.

Saddam Hussein's cult of personality became a prominent feature of Iraqi popular culture. He had thousands of portraits, posters, statues and murals erected in his honor all over Iraq. His face was visible on office buildings, schools, classrooms, airports, and shops, as well as on all denominations of the Iraqi dinar. Saddam aimed to appeal to all aspects of Iraqi society. He donned Bedouin clothing, the traditional clothes of the Iraqi peasants, and even Kurdish clothing. He also appeared in Western clothing to project the image of an urban and modern leader. He also portrayed himself as a devout Sunni Muslim, wearing a full headdress and robe, praying towards Mecca, but most often, he was shown wearing a military uniform.

After the fall of his regime in 2003, symbolized by the toppling of his statue on Firdous Square in Baghdad on April 9, 2003, all statues of Saddam were destroyed. All other aspects of his cult of personality were dismantled thereafter.

=== Purges and executions ===
Saddam was known for employing terror against his own citizens. The Economist described Saddam as "one of the last of the 20th century's great dictators, but not the least in terms of egotism, or cruelty, or morbid will to power." Saddam's regime brought about the deaths of at least 250,000 Iraqis and committed war crimes in Iran, Kuwait, and Saudi Arabia. Human Rights Watch and Amnesty International issued regular reports of widespread imprisonment and torture. Saddam also used Iraq's oil wealth to develop a patronage system for supporters of his regime.

The Anfal campaign of 1988 was undertaken in the northern regions of Iraq in response to the Iranian-backed Kurdish insurgency. Human Rights Watch estimates that between 50,000 and 100,000 people were killed. Following the disastrous Gulf War, Shias rebelled in southern Iraq and executed Ba'athist officials during the 1991 Iraqi uprisings. Saddam responded with repression, killing enemies and suspected political dissidents, resulting in the deaths of about 150,000 Iraqi Shias.

=== Secularism and sectarianism ===
Under Saddam's rule, Sunni-Shia conflict was more of a national difference than a religious one. The term "Ajam" (non-Arabs) was used to discredit Shia activists and political dissidents, and particularly the Iranians. Saddam's regime maintained secular beliefs and avoided sectarian violence, Saddam's tight grip on Iraq ensured a sense of unity, sectarian violence growth in Iraq began after the end of Saddam's regime. Iraq, while ruled mostly by Sunnis, maintained a diverse group of leadership, with Assyrian, Kurdish and Shia arabs participating in government alongside Sunnis, with Saddam's regime prioritizing loyalty. Saddam banned and suppressed Shia public displays of Tatbir, Ashura, and mourning of Muharram. Sectarian tensions became evident during the Iranian Revolution in 1979 and the ensuing Iran–Iraq War. The new Shia Islamist leader of Iran, Ruhollah Khomeini, initiated a propaganda campaign calling on Iraqi Shias to accept Khomeinism and rebel against the Sunni-dominated Ba'athist regime of Saddam.

Despite Saddam's fears of unrest, Iran's attempts to export its Islamic Revolution were largely unsuccessful in rallying support from Shias in Iraq and the Gulf states. Most Iraqi Shias, who formed the majority of the Iraqi Armed Forces, chose their own country over their Shia Iranian coreligionists during the Iran–Iraq War. To thwart the threat of Shia opposition during the war, Saddam made improvements for the Shia community. He invited a large number of Shia to join the ruling Ba'ath Party, a shift from their previous exclusion from this political organization. Shias were majority in the party's governing body and 40% of the membership of the National Assembly of Iraq.

Following the Gulf War, Shias participated in a largely sectarian uprising against Saddam's regime. Shia rebels held pictures of Shia religious leaders such as Iranian leader Khomeini, as well as Shia religious symbols. The uprisings were quelled by the regime through the use of force and mass executions, and Sunni state control managed to restore order. Throughout the 1990s, Saddam relied more on Sunni Arab officials from his own tribe of Al-Bu Nasir. However, just like other communities, there were Shia loyalists, who served in his government, such as Sadun Hammadi and Muhammad Saeed al-Sahhaf.
