= Zeid Hijazi =

Palestinian-Jordanian fashion designer

- Born: February 1998 (age 28); Amman, Jordan
- Education: Central Saint Martins (BA)
- Years active: 2019–present

Zeid Hijazi (born February 1998) is a Jordanian-Palestinian fashion designer. He won the Franca Sozzani Debut Talent Award at the 2020 Fashion Trust Arabia.

== Early life ==
Hijazi was born in Amman. Hijazi took a year-long foundation course at Central Saint Martins. After pausing his studies, he returned to Central Saint Martins, going on to graduate with a Bachelor of Arts (BA).

== Career ==
Hijazi founded his eponymous ready-to-wear label in 2019. Hijazi won the Franca Sozzani Debut Talent Award at the 2020 Fashion Trust Arabia. With his prize money, Hijazi launched his label's debut Spring/Summer 2022 collection Kalt. The collection is named after the lead character of the film Bedwin Hacker (2003).

Hijazi returned to the 2023 Fashion Trust Arabia, where he was a finalist for the Ready-to-Wear Award.

In 2025, Hijazi created a "tartan-tatreez hybrid look" for the exhibition Thread Memory: Embroidery from Palestine at the V&A Dundee; his work also featured in the Tatreez: Palestinian Embroidery display at London's V&A. The exhibition and display were curated by Rachel Dedman. That autumn, Hijazi showcased his work at London Fashion Week. At the victory celebration for the election of New York City mayor Zohran Mamdani in November, Mamdani's wife Rama Duwaji wore a piece designed by Hijazi. That year, Hijazi was named a top Arab fashion designer by Love Happens.

Hijazi is a finalist for the 2026–2028 Prix MMM, awarded by the Maison Mode Méditerranée. He reunited with Dedman for the exhibition Embroidering Palestine for MoMu Antwerp.This was followed by Embroidering Palestine at MoMu Antwerp into 2026.

== Artistry ==
Hijazi has named Lam Qua, Francis Bacon and 1950s Christian Dior as artistic influences, as well as Martin Margiela, Rick Owens, Hedi Slimane and Tom Ford as style inspirations. He also praised contemporary and "best friend" Cynthia Merhej. Hijazi is "inspired by folklore and futurism". His work incorporates Palestinian symbology, "symbols my ancestors created", and pastoral embroidery.
