= Wadi Khaled =

Wadi Khaled وادي خالد
- Location within Lebanon
- Coordinates: 34.619055°N 36.37835°E
- Country: Lebanon
- Governorate: Akkar Governorate
- District: Akkar District

Area
  - Total: 40 km^{2} (15 sq mi)
- Highest elevation: 700 m (2,300 ft)
- Lowest elevation: 370 m (1,210 ft)

Population (2017)
  - Total: 41,000 Lebanese and 31,000 Syrian refugees
  - Density: 1,000/km^{2} (2,700/sq mi)
- Time zone: UTC+2 (EET)
  - Summer (DST): UTC+3 (EEST)
- Dialing code: +06

Wadi Khaled (Arabic: وادي خالد) is an area in the district of Akkar, on the borders of northeastern Lebanon.

In Wadi Khaled, it is very hot in summer, so cold in winter and humid in all seasons. The altitude of this region is between 370 meters (El Msalabieh) and 700 meters (Hneider). It is 175 km from Beirut and 70 km from Tripoli.

There are 27 villages in Wadi Khaled, with Al-Amayer being the most populous.

== History ==
The population of Wadi Khaled has long been stateless, particularly due to the residents' non-participation in the 1932 Lebanese population census, despite having inhabited the area for centuries. The majority of the inhabitants of the region obtained Lebanese nationality in 1994, thanks to the decree of naturalization n°5247, however there remain an estimated 1,600 stateless people in this region today. The national youth forum in Wadi Khaled was the first to ask for the naturalization of the inhabitants of the village as well as several solidarity and social movements and supporters.

During the Syrian civil war, tens of thousands of Syrian refugees, mainly Sunni families, crossed the border to settle in the region.

In July 2022, fighting emerged between two rival families from neighboring localities. At least one person was killed and several more injured by gunfire. The military then intervened and raided the homes of those involved and arrested several.
