= Palestinians in Iraq =

Palestinians residing in Iraq

- Palestine Iraq

Total population
- 10,000 to 13,000

Regions with significant populations
- Baghdad, Basra, Mosul, Baqubah

Languages
- Palestinian Arabic, Iraqi Arabic

Religion
- Predominantly Sunni Muslims with some Christians (mostly Roman Catholic)

Related ethnic groups
- Other Palestinians

Palestinians in Iraq are a group of Palestinians who have been living in Iraq since they were displaced during the Nakba in 1948. Before 2003, there were approximately 34,000 Palestinians thought to be living in Iraq, mainly concentrated in Baghdad. However, since the 2003 Iraq War, the population has decreased to between 10,000–13,000, although the precise population is difficult to determine. The situation of Palestinians in Iraq deteriorated after the fall of Saddam Hussein and particularly following the bombing of the Al-Askari Mosque in 2006.

During the occupation of Iraq, Palestinians who lived in the country became the targets of violence, killings and scapegoating by Shia militia groups. With the rise in insecurity throughout Iraq, they have been the target of expulsion, persecution and violence with the new Iraqi Government with militant groups targeting them for preferential treatment they received under the Ba'ath Party rule. Currently, several hundred Palestinians from Iraq are living in border camps, after being refused entry to neighbouring Jordan and Syria. Others have been resettled to third countries.

== History ==
The 1922 census of Palestine lists 18 Palestinians as living abroad in Iraq (then listed as Mesopotamia): 3 Muslims, 14 Jews, and 1 Christian.

The birth of the Palestinian community in modern Iraq dates back to 1948, when the Iraqi army, which had been fighting in Palestine, returned to Baghdad with a group of Palestinians who had been forced to flee their homes in Haifa and Jaffa. In addition, some Palestinian villagers had been forcibly drafted by the invading Iraqi army, and they and their families were allowed to resettle in Iraq. Following the 1967 war with Israel, a second larger wave of Palestinians sought refuge in Iraq. The third and final wave occurred in 1991 after the Iraqi invasion of Kuwait, when those Palestinians living in Kuwait fled. Over the years, there were also many Palestinians who came to Iraq in search of work. Prior to 2003, there were approximately 25,000 registered Palestinian refugees living in Iraq. In December 2010, approximately 10,000 Palestinians remained in Iraq, the majority of whom were living in and around Baghdad.

=== Under Saddam Hussein ===
Iraq is not a signatory of the 1951 Geneva Convention relating to the protection of refugees. Palestinians were never awarded official status by the Iraqi authorities, but were given a degree of protection and assistance by the Iraqi government, guided by the Casablanca Protocol of the League of Arab States in 1965. During Saddam Hussein's rule, Palestinians received by and large equitable treatment. They were granted residency permits, full access to government services including healthcare and education, and were also permitted to work. The government also issued special travel documents for Palestinian refugees, allowing them to travel freely around Iraq but making it extremely difficult to leave the country. Some political and sectarian entities claim that Palestinians were treated favourably under the Ba'thist regime. The government built special housing complexes, and provided heavily subsidized accommodation for Palestinians. Palestinians were also exempt from military service, and scholarships were also awarded to Palestinian students, enabling them to study at certain universities. During the years of economic sanctions in the 1990s, the Iraqi government froze rent prices, forcing Iraqi landlords to rent their apartments to Palestinians for as little as $1 per month. This was also a cause of resentment among those Iraqis toward Palestinians.

=== During the UN Sanctions on Iraq ===
The Palestinians suffered very much as a result of the UN sanctions on Iraq (1990–2003). Saddam Hussein's Revolution Command Council decided that Palestinians must not be allowed to invest in companies and not be allowed to invest in any kind of entrepreneurial businesses; They had to obtain special permissions to marry Iraqis, and Palestinians who had Iraqi mothers could not inherit their mothers. Palestinians were not allowed to live in areas close to international boundaries and were not allowed to work in security sensitive areas. The Palestinians were also trapped inside Iraq because of the UN sanctions did not allow air travel to and from Iraq and because Iraq's neighbours did not allow the Palestinians to enter their countries. Palestinians were also only allowed to join the regime-backed Ba'ath Party and were not allowed to join the traditional Palestinian political organisations.

== Persecution in post–war Iraq ==
After the fall of Saddam Hussein's regime in April 2003, Palestinians in Iraq became the target of attacks, persecution, eviction, expulsion, harassment, rape, and killings by Shia militants, and the new Iraqi Government with militant groups particularly targeting them for their support for Saddam Hussein and that they were treated better than Shias under Saddam's Rule. Palestinian neighborhoods such as al-Doura, al-Hurriyya and al-Baladiyyat in Baghdad were also bombarded and attacked. A report by the UNHCR in 2007 provided details of the violence and persecution perpetrated against Palestinians in Iraq, which included abductions, attacks, torture by both unknown militia groups and the Iraqi Ministry of the Interior and the deaths of many Palestinian women, men and children.

=== Governmental policies ===
Under the newly elected Iraqi government, Palestinians were stripped of their residency permits and made to register at the Ministry of the Interior each month. This proved extremely dangerous, and the fear of being shot upon entering or leaving the ministry has deterred many Palestinians from obtaining their right to residency in Iraq. In addition, Human Rights Watch reported that Ministry of Interior officials have arbitrarily arrested, beaten, tortured, and in a few cases, forcibly disappeared Palestinian refugees.

=== Bombing of the Al-Askari Mosque ===
After the bombing of the Shia Muslim Al-Askari Mosque in the city of Samarra, the circumstances of those Palestinians living in Iraq worsened considerably as they became scapegoats, synonymous with "terrorists" and "insurgents". Human Rights Watch reported that in mid-March, an unknown militia group calling itself the "Judgment Day Brigades" distributed leaflets in Palestinian neighborhoods, accusing the Palestinians of collaborating with the insurgents and stating the following: "We warn that we will eliminate you all if you do not leave this area for good within ten days." Grand Ayatollah Ali al-Sistani issued a fatwa in April 2006, forbidding any attacks on Palestinians. However, the mass killings and death threats put the Palestinian community in a "state of shock" and forced thousands to leave the country, according to the United Nations High Commissioner for Refugees (UNHCR).

== Palestinians fleeing Iraq ==
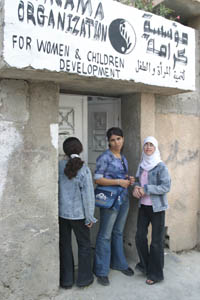
Karamadoor

After 2003, the majority of Palestinians were either killed or fled to the neighbouring countries of Syria and Jordan – neither of which is a signatory to the 1951 Geneva Convention, although each country adheres to the 1965 Casablanca Protocol without reservation. Despite the admirable generosity and hospitality of Syria and Jordan towards thousands of Iraqis, and their large and well-integrated populations of Palestinians, both countries have closed their borders to Palestinians coming from Iraq. As a result, many have been left stranded in squalid conditions within border camps such as Al-Waleed or Al-Karama, both of which are situated in ‘No Man's Land’ near to the borders shared with Syria and Jordan. Others have had no choice but to return to cities of Baghdad and Mosul. In 2007, UNHCR published ‘Eligibility Guidelines for Assessing the International Protection Needs of Iraqi Asylum-Seekers’, which stated that many Arab refugees (including Palestinians) “...do not hold valid documentation, limiting their freedom of movement, access to services and putting them at risk of detention and possibly refoulement. As such, in adjudicating the refugee claims of individuals who were previously refugees in Iraq, the current situation in Iraq is such that “effective protection” in the country is generally unavailable.”

=== Jordan ===
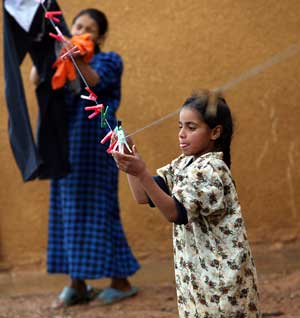
Palestinian girls stranded near the Iraqi-Jordanian border

Jordan has the largest number of refugees relative to total population in the world, and is host to the highest number of Palestinian refugees under the mandate of the United Nations Relief and Works Agency (UNRWA). The 1952 Jordanian Constitution does forbid the extradition of ‘political refugees...on account of their political beliefs or their defence of liberty'. Furthermore, the government signed a Memorandum of Understanding with UNHCR in 1998, underlining its agreement to the definition of a refugee and the obligation of non-refoulement. Historically, the Jordanian government has granted full citizenship to the vast majority of Palestinian refugees, while UNRWA administers aid and provides health and education services to those living in refugee camps. Its policies towards Iraqis have been less clear. Currently, the government estimates that 450,000 – 500,000 Iraqis live in Jordan, although only 31,000 of these Iraqis are registered with UNHCR. The regime has followed the principles of Arab hospitality and brotherhood by opening its doors to thousands of Iraqis; yet its policies towards them with regard to provision of basic services have been less clear. Moreover, it has preferred to use ‘visitor’ or ‘guest’ when referring to Iraqis, avoiding the socially and politically loaded term ‘refugee’ and the subsequent need to establish more permanent arrangements, services and solutions that would strain Jordanian infrastructure. The situation for Palestinians from Iraq fleeing to Jordan after 2003 following the invasion of Iraq is yet more difficult. Aside from a few with family connections inside Jordan, the majority of Palestinians were refused entry or free movement inside the country. Thus, many were stranded in No Man's Land between Iraq and Jordan, or detained in Al-Raweished Camp within Jordan.

==== Al Ruweished Camp ====
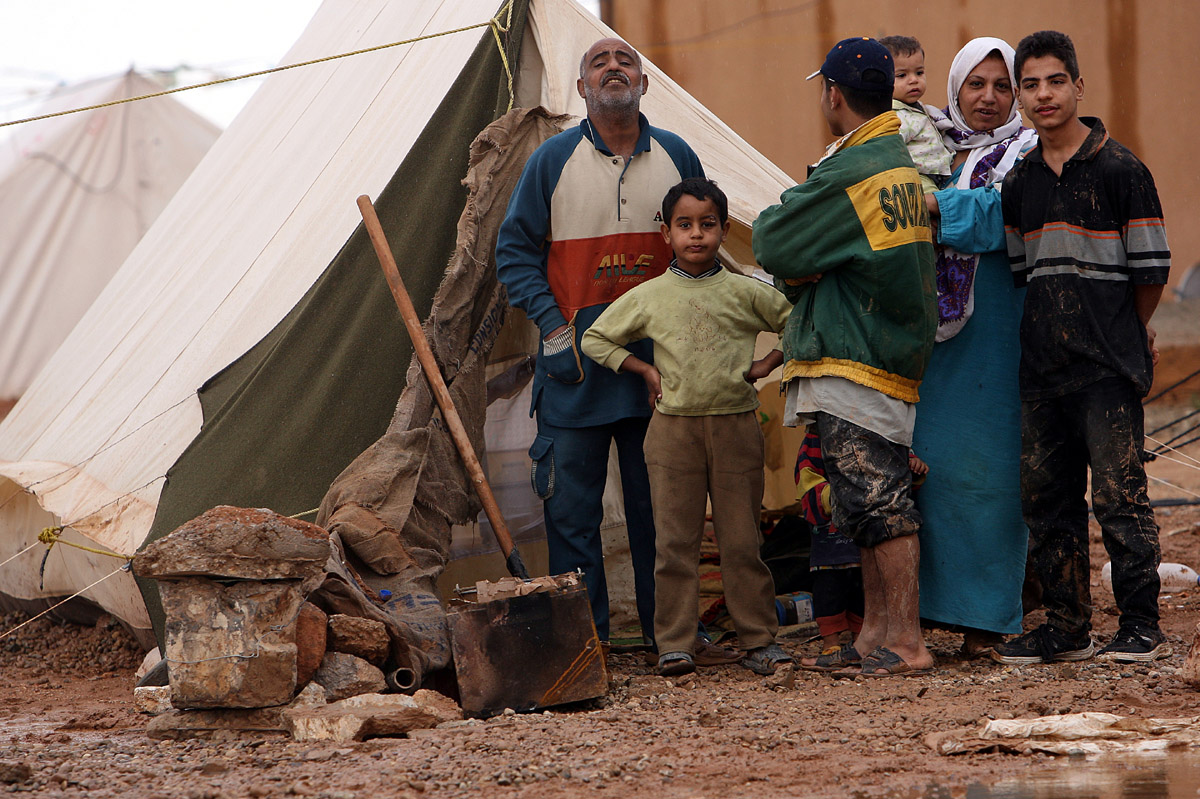
Palestinian Iraqi IDP family near Jordanian border

Al Ruweished was located in Eastern Jordan, 60 kilometres from the border with Iraq. Over the years, those living in the camp have included Palestinians from Iraq, Iranian Kurds, Somalis and Sudanese. In December 2003, Angelina Jolie visited the camp by helicopter, and kept a journal of her experiences. She reported that most of the 500 residents of al-Ruweished were Palestinians, and over 100 of them were under the age of 16. Living conditions in the camp were extremely difficult, with soaring temperatures during the summer months, and storms during the harsh winters. The UNHCR and local NGOs provided food and assistance to camp residents. However, most children were unable to access education.

Since 2003, more than a thousand people have been resettled to third countries, including 54 Palestinians who were granted asylum in Canada in November 2006, and 107 Palestinians who were accepted by Brazil in 2007. Later, in November that year, the remaining residents (all of whom were Palestinian) were resettled in the states of São Paulo and Rio Grande do Sul in Brazil. There, they were promised rented accommodation, furniture and material aid for up to two years, as moral support from volunteers in the communities, who were to help them with local integration.

=== Syria ===
There has been a significant Palestinian presence in Syria since the first arrivals in 1948, as well as several hundred thousand Iraqis in recent years. According to a Fafo report in 2007, “Palestinian refugees have been better integrated into Syrian society than in Jordan” Unlike Jordan, Palestinians living in Syria have not been granted citizenship. Aside from Syrian nationality and the right to vote, Palestinians are entitled to “...the same civil rights and services as those enjoyed by local citizens, and are more socially integrated than Palestinian refugees in any other host country.” Similar to Jordan, Syria has not signed the 1951 Convention, but is party to the 1965 Casablanca Protocol for the protection of Palestinian refugees. The 1973 constitution does not allow for the deportation of refugees because of their 'political principles or defence of freedom', although the government does not have a procedure for granting asylum. The Syrian Ministry of Social Affairs also shares a Memorandum of Understanding with UNHCR, allowing for assistance and cooperation with local organizations to provide aid to refugees.

After such a history of providing shelter and services for Palestinian and Iraqi refugees, it is therefore unclear as to why the Syrian government has refused entry to Palestinians coming from Iraq since 2006.

==== Al Tanf Camp ====
Al-Tanf Camp was a makeshift camp located on the Syrian side of the border with Iraq. It was first opened in 2006, when 389 Iraqi-Palestinians were refused entry by the Syrian authorities. UNHCR representatives envisioned that the camp would be open for a matter of weeks, but weeks turned into years, despite unbearable living standards. Numbers within the camp continued to increase, as those Palestinians from Iraq arriving in Syria using forged documents were discovered by the Syrian authorities. During the period from March 2006 until the day of its closure in 2010, it hosted over 1,300 Iraqi-Palestinians.

Living conditions in Al-Tanf were extremely grim, with residents exposed to the harsh climate of the desert. Extreme temperatures, sandstorms, strong winds and devastating were endured by residents, as well as infestations of scorpions and vermin. Outbreaks of fire were also a common occurrence in Al Tanf and other camps, due to the highly flammable canvas tents. A pregnant woman was killed there in January 2009, when the tent she was staying in caught fire.

Some residents of the camp established an amateur television network called Al Tanf Media Group, to draw attention to their suffering, and to occupy younger residents of the camp and to provide them with opportunities to acquire skills. Using a computer and a small digital camera, they were able to produce short documentaries and organize screenings within the camp. These films were distributed over the internet, and to delegations from international organizations visiting the camps.

On 1 February 2010, UNHCR closed the camp and moved the last remaining 60 residents to Al Hol camp, where it was said they would live temporarily before being resettled to third countries.

==== Al Hol Camp ====
Al Hol remains open to this day, and is located in the north-eastern province of Hassakeh around 55 km from the city of Deir ez-Zor., close to the border with Iraq. The camp first opened in 1991, to cope with the influx of Iraqi refugees from the Gulf War. It reopened in 2005 in response to the Palestinians fleeing Iraq. Currently, there are 45 families living in the camp without news of resettlement in the near future. As a result, UNRWA and UNHCR have begun to work with residents of the camp to provide them with more permanent arrangements. Children of the camp attend school with Syrian children in the nearby village of Al Hol, men grow crops to provide additional food, the UNHCR provides basic education, health and recreational facilities within the camp; and vocational training schemes for women have been established by the International Organization of Migration in partnership with the European Union.

== Resettlement ==
Resettlement continues to evade thousands of Iraqi-Palestinians, living as IDPs in Iraq or refugees in squalid border camps. However, there has been progress - particularly for those living in the border camps in Iraq, Syria and Jordan. At the end of 2009, 61 residents of Al-Tanf camp were given permission to settle in Italy, and out of the 1,300 Iraqi-Palestinian residents who had been stranded in the camp, more than 1000 were relocated to third countries; including Belgium, Chile, Finland, Italy, Norway, Sweden, Switzerland and the United Kingdom. In 2009, the United States also allowed more than a thousand Iraqi Palestinians from camps inside Iraq to be resettled within its borders. This was the largest ever Palestinian refugee resettlement in U.S. history. Critics of the State Department decision to resettle this group of Palestinians objected that they were sympathizers of Saddam Hussein. In December 2009, the united efforts of the not for profit company, Australian Society for Palestinian Iraqi Refugees Emergency (ASPIRE), and Amnesty International-Australia led to the Australian government approving 16 families making up 68 people from Al Hol for humanitarian refugee status. They are now living in Melbourne and Perth.

== Durable solutions and the current situation ==
In February 2010, the UNHCR pledged to "continue to advocate a dignified solution for all those Palestinian refugees stranded in camps". However, as of March 2011, a few thousand Iraqi-Palestinians were thought to be living illegally in Damascus without access to services. Moreover, several hundred Palestinians remained in Al Waleed and Al Hol camps, without immediate hope of resettlement in third countries. In the Summer of 2014 at least 85 Palestinian refugees, mainly from Mosul, took shelter at Khazir IDP camp and later Baharka IDP camp, near Erbil, fleeing the Islamic State in Iraq and Levant during the Northern Iraq Offensive.

== Notable people ==
- Hanan Alattar, opera singer
- Sama Raena Alshaibi, artist and photographer (Born in Basra to an Iraqi father and a Palestinian mother)
- Leila Barclay, American journalist and storyteller (Born in Beirut to an Iraqi mother and Palestinian father)
- Raad Ghantous, interior designer
- Raed Jarrar, architect, blogger, and activist
- Bashar Lulua, orchestra conductor (Born in Damascus to an Iraqi father and a Palestinian mother)
- Sharif Hikmat Nashashibi, co-founder and chairman of Arab Media Watch
- Rakad Salem, politician
- Nada Shabout, art historian (Born in Glasgow to a Palestinian mother and an Iraqi father)
- Jalal Toufic, artist (Born to an Iraqi father and a Palestinian mother)
- Badr Albanaa, Neurophysicist And Professor

== See also ==
- Iraq–Palestine relations
- Violence against Palestinians in Iraq
- Palestinians in Egypt
- Palestinians in Jordan
- Palestinians in Lebanon
- Palestinians in Syria
- Palestinians in Jordan
