= Palestinians in Egypt =

Refugees after the 1948 Palestine war and others

Total population
- 50,245-110,000

Regions with significant populations
- Cairo (Greater Cairo)

Languages
- Arabic (Palestinian Arabic)

Religion
- Sunni Islam and Christianity

Related ethnic groups
- Palestinians

Palestinians in Egypt include the Palestinian refugees who fled or were expelled to Egypt during the 1948 Palestine war, and their descendants, as well as Palestinians expelled from Jordan, following the events of Black September. Palestinians and their descendants have never been naturalized and so keep the distinct status of Palestinian refugee. Some Palestinians, mostly Christians, received Egyptian citizenship through marriage with Egyptian nationals or by other means.

There was also an earlier wave of Palestinian immigration, in which Palestinian Christians settled in Egypt and other surrounding countries, fleeing genocides during the Ottoman era, along with Lebanese and Syrians, forming what was known as the "Shawam" (شوام) Christian community.

The 1922 census of Palestine lists 1,612 Palestinians as living abroad in Egypt: 614 Muslims, 756 Jews, and 242 Christians.

Estimates of the size of the Palestinian population in Egypt range from 50,245 to 110,000. However after 2023 it might be around 200,000.

The rise of Gamal Abdel Nasser ushered in a golden age for Palestinians living in Egypt. Palestinians were regarded as equal to Egyptians and had free access to education. However that changed in 1978 with the signing of the Camp David Accords and assassination of Culture Minister Yusuf Sibai by Abu Nidal militants. After that, laws were amended so that Palestinians were treated as foreigners.

Fadel Island, also known as "the Arab's Island," is located on the Nile Delta and is home to the largest population of refugees from the 1948 Palestine war at 3,500 people.

During the Gaza war, it is estimated by the Palestinian Authority that at least 115,000 Palestinians from the Gaza Strip crossed into Egypt.

== See also ==
- Palestinian diaspora
- Casablanca Protocol – 1965 instrument on Palestinian refugees
- Palestinians in Jordan
- Palestinians in Iraq
- Palestinians in Lebanon
- Palestinians in Syria
- Rafah Border Crossing – Egypt–Palestine border crossing
- Sinai Desert
