= Ortadoğu Analiz =

Bimonthly political magazine in Turkey

- Editor in Chief: Ismail Numan Telci; Mustafa Yetim
- President: Ahmet Uysal
- Categories: political science, foreign affairs
- Frequency: Bimonthly
- Publisher: Center for Middle Eastern Strategic Studies
- Founded: 2009
- First issue: January 2009
- Country: Turkey
- Based in: Ankara
- Language: Turkish
- Website: www.orsam.org.tr
- ISSN: 1308-7541

Ortadoğu Analiz (meaning Middle East Analysis in English) is a Turkish bimonthly political commentary magazine founded in 2009. It covers political, economic, cultural and historical analysis, and current news from the Middle East.

== History and profile ==
The first issue of Ortadoğu Analiz appeared in January 2009 with a special focus on the Gaza Strip in Palestine. In the first issue, the magazine was including independent academic commentaries, book reviews and an interview with an important political figure. The magazine is part of the Center for Middle Eastern Strategic Studies and is published by the Center on a bimonthly basis.

In 2013, the magazine changed its style. It not only abandoned to use reference and abstracts in commentaries, but it also shortened commentaries. This change made the magazine less academic and therefore closer to public readers. It was previously published on a monthly basis.

== List of editors ==
- Tarık Oğuzlu, 2009-2013
- Murat Yeşiltaş, 2013-2014
- Ali Balcı, 2015-2018
- Gokhan Bozbas, 2019
- Mustafa Yetim, 2020
- İsmail Numan Telci and Mustafa Yetim, 2021-
