= Cynthia Merhej =

Palestinian-Lebanese fashion designer and illustrator (born 1989/1990)

- Born: 1989 or 1990 (age 36–37); Beirut, Lebanon
- Education: Central Saint Martins (BA); Royal College of Art (MA)
- Occupations: Fashion designer; illustrator
- Years active: 2016–present

Cynthia Merhej (Arabic: سينتيا مرهج, born 1989 or 1990) is a Palestinian-Lebanese fashion designer and illustrator. She opened the couture womenswear atelier Renaissance Renaissance in Beirut and Paris. In 2021, Merhej became the first Arab woman shortlisted for the LVMH Prize.

== Early life ==
Merhej grew up in a suburb of Beirut, Lebanon. Her great-grandmother Laurice Srouji opened an eponymous couture atelier in Jaffa, Palestine, that was frequented by socialites in the 1930s. Srouji was expelled and forced to leave her business during the Nakba. Merhej's mother Laura Merhej is also a designer. Merhej graduated from with a Bachelor of Arts (BA) in Illustration from London's Central Saint Martins in 2011 and a Master of Arts (MA) in Visual Communication from the Royal College of Art in 2013.

== Career ==
In 2016, Merhej founded her label couture womenswear atelier, initially called Renaissance, in Beirut. For two years. Merhej worked in her mother's atelier Nos Intuitions, preparing to launch her first collection. Merhej was named a 2019 designer to watch by Angela Koh of The New York Times. Merhej began collaborating with Net-a-Porter, and Renaissance Renaissance was selected for the company's Vanguard programme. Amid the 2020 Beirut explosion, Merhej relocated her operations to Paris.

For Renaissance Renaissance, in 2021, Merhej became the first Arab woman shortlisted for the LVMH Prize. Merhej was also a finalist for the Ready-to-Wear Award at the 2021 Fashion Trust Arabia. Merhej returned to the 2023 Fashion Trust Arabia, where she jointly won the Evening Wear Award with Amir Al Kasm.

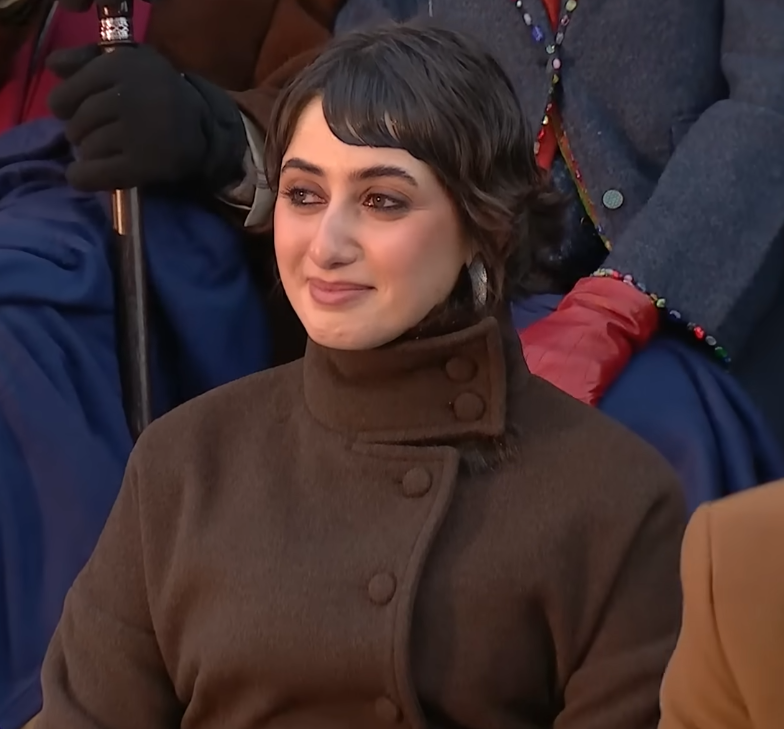
First Lady of New York City Rama Duwaji wearing a Renaissance Renaissance coat at her husband's inauguration, January 2026

Merhej collaborated with Miyako Bellizzi on the costume design for Durga Chew-Bose's film Bonjour Tristesse (2024). For the second time, Merhej's Renaissance Renaissance was shortlisted for the 2025 LVMH Prize. She has presented several Renaissance Renaissance collections at Paris Fashion Week.

== Artistry ==
Merhej aims to design timeless and sustainable rather than trendy pieces, creating capsule collections for the "perennial wardrobe".

== Personal life ==
Merhej has ADHD.
