= Palestinians in Syria =

People of Palestinian origin in Syria

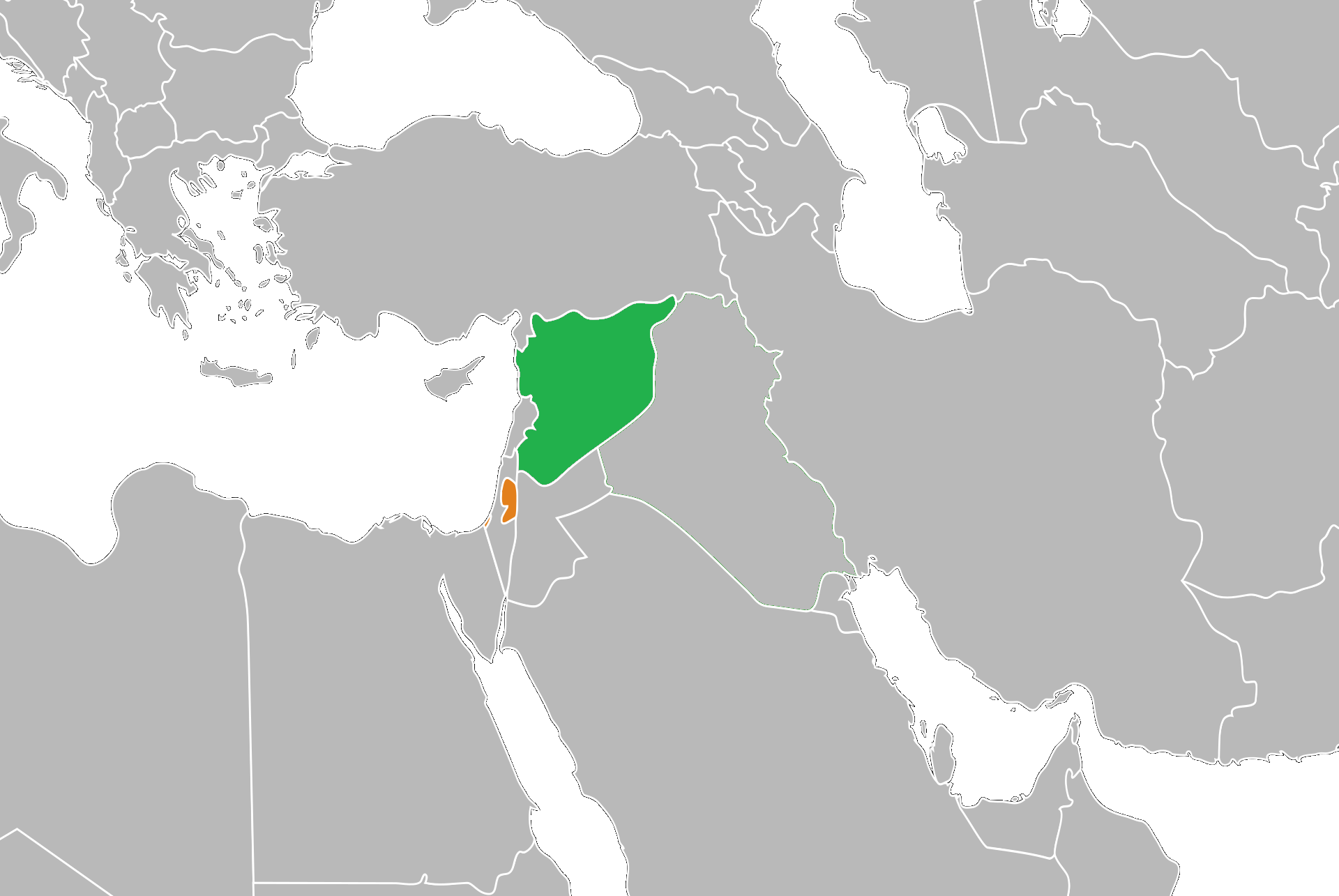

Total population
- 475,173 (2009)

Regions with significant populations
- Damascus, Rif Dimashq, Daraa, Homs, Aleppo, Latakia and Hama governorates

Languages
- Arabic (Palestinian Arabic, Syrian Arabic)

Religion
- Islam and Christianity

Palestinians in Syria (Arabic: الفلسطينيون في سوريا) are people of Palestinian origin, most of whom have been residing in Syria after they were displaced from their homes during the 1948 Palestinian expulsion and flight. Palestinians hold most of the same rights as the Syrian population, but cannot become Syrian nationals except in rare cases. As of October 2023, there are 585,610 people who registered with UNRWA-Syria as Palestinian refugees. Due to the Syrian Civil War, the number of registered refugees still residing in Syria has dropped to 430,000, with more than 100,000 immigrating to Europe.

In Resolution No. 1011 of 2022 regarding property ownership, the Bashar al-Assad regime reclassified Palestinian refugees as foreigners, thereby complicating their inheritance rights and risking confiscation.

As of 2026, the overwhelming majority of Palestinians in Syria continue to be treated as stateless refugees regardless of how long they have remained in the country, with severe restrictions imposed on their travel and return to Syria. Escalating demands exist to grant them Syrian citizenship like the Kurds, considering it a human right and a matter of preserving dignity. While refugees who arrived before 1956 receive Syrian-equivalent treatment in education, health, and employment, post-1956 refugees are generally treated as foreigners.

== History ==
At the end of the 1948 Arab–Israeli War, there were estimated to be about 70,000 Palestinian refugees in Syria, initially housed in deserted military barracks in As-Suwayda, Aleppo, Homs, and Hama. Most fled their home as ordered by their leaders. They fled from northern Palestinian districts, Safad, Haifa, Jaffa, Acre, Tiberias, Nazareth, and Tyrus. Some refugees arrived in Syria via Lebanon, some came from Galilee and the Hula Valley onto the Golan Heights, and others came directly from Palestine to Jordan and Syria.

In January 1949, Sirayan Law no. 450 was passed, legislating the status of the refugees, declaring they will never be nationalized into the burgeoning nation of Syria. Instead it established the Palestine Arab Refugee Institution (PARI), which later was replaced by the General Authority for Palestine Arab Refugees (GAPAR), to manage the Palestinian refugee affairs. GAPAR's responsibilities were refugee registration, relief assistance, finding employment opportunities for the refugees, and managing funds and contributions intended for them. GAPAR, with the United Nations Relief and Works Agency for Palestine Refugees in the Near East (UNRWA), jointly administer the camps. UNRWA is an agency that works for Palestine refugee and is mostly funded by voluntary contributions. They also receive their funding from the Regular budget of the United Nations. UNRWA was established by the United Nations General Assembly Resolution 302 IV of 8 December 1949 to carry out relief programs for Palestinian Refugees.

According to GAPAR data, 85,000 Palestinian refugees settled in Syria by the end of 1948. According to author Laurie Brand, the full initial influx of Palestinians was substantial (90,000–100,000), and the government, through a series of laws, gradually paved the way for their integration into the Syrian socioeconomic structure while preserving their separate Palestinian identity.

By 1960, GAPAR reported the Palestinian refugee population was 126,662. In 1967, Palestinian refugees fled the Quneitra Governorate in the Golan Heights, and around 4,200 of them were housed in Daraa Emergency Camp. In 1970, as a result of Black September, some Palestinian refugees fled from Jordan to Syria. In 1982, in the wake of 1982 Lebanon War, a few thousand Palestinian refugees left Lebanon and found shelter in Syria. In 1989, the refugee population had risen to 296,508. By the end of 1998, the number was 366,493. There are nine official and three unofficial camps for refugees, with 111,208 refugees living in camps in 2002.

=== Current trends ===
On account of the civil war in Syria that commenced in 2011, many Palestinians in Syria have been displaced, either within Syria itself or they have fled the country. Their propensity to fleeing includes having been under siege in refugee camps, while many have opted to make the dangerous journey to Europe as conditions remain hostile to Palestinians in neighboring Middle Eastern states.

According to UNRWA, more than half a million Palestinians resided in refugee camps in Syria before the war started. As of 2019, the UN estimate that at least 120,000 Palestinians have been displaced from Syria since 2011. According to the Euro-Mediterranean Human Rights Monitor, Palestinians who lived in refugee camps in Syria have faced additional obstacles, since they have been made "refugees for the second time". The Geneva-based organization reported that more than 160,000 Palestinian Syrian refugees had left their camps in Syria, migrating to neighboring or countries of the European Union. These include nearly 80,000 refugees who fled to Europe, 57,276 others who fled to neighboring countries, such as Lebanon, Jordan, and Turkey, and another 7,000 Palestinian Syrian refugees who fled to Egypt and the Gaza Strip.

As of 2017, the UN estimated that 450,000 Palestinian refugees remain in Syria, of whom up to 280,000 are internally displaced, and an estimated 43,000 are trapped in hard-to-reach locations. Some continue to be displaced multiple times as a result of armed violence.

3,642 Palestinians died during the first seven years of war, 1,651 Palestinians had been detained, and more than 300 Palestinians were unaccounted for. Residents of Palestinian camps have suffered from air raids, shelling, siege, and malnutrition, in particular in Yarmouk Camp in the Damascus area, besieged by the government until 2018, leading to the displacement of over 100,000 and many deaths from starvation. By 2019, 3,987 Palestinians, including 467 women and 200 children, had been killed in the conflict.

According to an UNRWA spokesperson, "Palestinians are among those worst affected by the Syrian conflict." He explained that 95 percent of the 438,000 Palestinians are in "critical need of sustained humanitarian assistance", with many dependent on the clinics, emergency assistance and teaching staff that UNRWA provides. UNRWA educates 45,000 students a day. 54 percent of UNRWA funds go to education, 17 percent goes to health, 16 percent goes to support services, 9 percent goes to relief and social services and 4 percent goes to infrastructure and camp improvement.

The president of the United States, Donald Trump pulled back funding for the United Nations agency for Palestinian refugees in 2018. Salim Salamah, the director of the Palestinian League of Human Rights – Syria, argues that "Palestinian refugees in Syria and those who have been doubly displaced to neighboring countries will suffer as a result of the decision. The impact is going to be really massive and tragic, for Palestinians of Syria, its life-saving aid, especially in the context that many Palestinians lack access to many basic services, even [those who fled] in Lebanon or Jordan."

Governorate	Total (2009)	% of Total
Aleppo (Note: Idlib numbers are also included.)	36,235	7.6
Damascus	326,355	68.7
Daraa (Note: Suweida numbers are also included.)	28,776	6.1
Deir ez-Zor (Note: Raqqa and Hasakah numbers are also included.)	464	0.1
Homs	21,999	4.6
Hama	9,226	1.9
Latakia (Note: Tartus numbers are also included.)	10,768	2.3
Quneitra	41,350	8.7
Total	475,173	100

== Rights ==
The Arab League's 1965 Casablanca Protocol provides the framework for the treatment of Palestinians living in the Arab States. It consisted of the following regulations: (1) While retaining their Palestinian nationality, Palestinians have the right of employment on par with its citizens. (2) Palestinians have the right to leave and return to their state of residence. (3) Palestinians residing in other Arab states have the right to enter and depart from other Arab states, but their right of entry only gives them the right to stay for the permitted period and for the purpose they entered for, so long as the authorities do not agree to the contrary. (4) Palestinians are given, upon request, valid travel documents; authorities must issue these documents or renew them without delay. (5) Bearers of these travel documents residing in Arab League states receive the same treatment as all other LAS state citizens, regarding visa and residency applications.

Children born in Syria to fathers who are Palestinian nationals, even if they themselves were born in Syria, are considered Palestinian not Syrian nationals. "Only in very limited circumstances, such as the absence or statelessness of a father, could the mother grant her child Syrian citizenship." Instead of a passport, Palestinians are given specific travel documents.

Palestinians in Syria have the right to own more than one business or commercial enterprise as well as the right to lease properties, to join unions, to travel with Syria and to establish residence in Syrian villages and cities. They are also eligible for drafting into the Syrian Armed Forces.

There is, however, a prominent gap between Palestinians' and nationals' right in home and land ownership laws: unlike Syrian nationals, Palestinians may not own more than one home or purchase arable land. And in terms of political rights, Palestinian refugees do not have the right to vote or stand as candidates for the People's Assembly of Syria (the Syrian parliament of representatives) or Presidency.

Following the fall of the Assad regime, Syria's civil registry offices began issuing new documents for Palestinians in July 2025, replacing the term “Palestinian Syrian” with “Palestinian resident” and listing “foreigner” instead of a governorate.

== See also ==
- Palestine–Syria relations
- Palestinian refugee
- Palestinians in Jordan
- Palestinians in Lebanon
- Palestinians in Iraq
- Palestinians in Egypt

== Sources ==
- Who We Are UNRWA. (n.d.). Retrieved March 2018, from Who We Are | UNRWA
- Nashashibi, S. (2016, 15 October). Morality and hypocrisy over Palestine and Syria. Retrieved March 2018, from Morality and hypocrisy over Palestine and Syria
- United Nations. (n.d.). Protocol for the Treatment of Palestinians in Arab States ("Casablanca Protocol"). Retrieved March 2018, from Protocol for the Treatment of Palestinians in Arab States ("Casablanca Protocol")
- Shafiq, R. (2015). (In)justice and the experience of civilian survivors of armed conflict: case studies from Palestine (Gaza), Iraq and Syria.
