= Center for Middle Eastern Strategic Studies =

Turkish-based think tank

Center for Middle Eastern Studies (ORSAM)
- Ortadoğu Araştırmaları Merkezi (ORSAM)
- Abbreviation: ORSAM
- Formation: 2009
- Type: Think Tank
- Headquarters: Mustafa Kemal Mah. 2128. Sok. No:3 Çankaya
- Location: Ankara
- Fields: Middle East and Northern Africa
- Official language: Turkish - Arabic - English
- President: Kadir Temiz
- Website: http://www.orsam.org.tr/en/homepage/

The Center for Middle Eastern Studies (Turkish: Ortadoğu Araştırmaları Merkezi), also known as ORSAM, is a non-profit, non-partisan think tank in Ankara, Turkey, founded on January 1, 2009. It seeks "to provide relevant information to the general public and to the foreign policy community".

== Activities ==
ORSAM mainly publishes reports on the Middle East with the aim of contributing "towards a healthier understanding and analysis of international politics and the Middle Eastern issues". For example, ORSAM, collaborating with the Turkish Economic and Social Studies Foundation, prepared a detailed report on the effects of Syrian refugees on Turkey in January 2015.

In addition to these reports, ORSAM publications include books, bulletins, newsletters, policy briefs, conference minutes and two journals: Ortadoğu Analiz (Middle Eastern Analysis) and Ortadoğu Etütleri (ISSN 2687-430X). Ortadoğu Etütleri is a bimonthly academic journal. Middle Eastern Analysis is a bimonthly popular journal. While Ortadoğu Etütleri publishes articles in both Turkish and English, the language of Ortadoğu Analiz is Turkish.

Since 2019, ORSAM has been going through a restructuring with its new administration. While Professor Ahmet Uysal is the President of the center, Associate Professor Ismail Numan Telci serves as the Vice President. ORSAM has opened its first branch in Istanbul in September 2020. ORSAM has around 40 full time research staff and number of non-resident researchers.
