= Iraq–Palestine relations =

- Iraq: Palestine

Relations between the Republic of Iraq and State of Palestine have historically been close, with Palestine Liberation Organization supported by the Ba'athist Iraqi regime during the second half of the 20th century, and vice versa, Iraqi Ba'athist regime supported by PLO leadership during the Gulf War. The State of Palestine has an embassy and consulate in Baghdad and Erbil accordingly, but Iraq doesn't have an embassy in Palestine.

== History ==
Iraq declared war on the newly established Jewish state of Israel in 1948; since then, relations between the two states have remained hostile. Iraq has strongly supported the cause of the Palestinians since then. Iraq sent armies to fight Israel in 1948 and 1967. Iraq also sent troops to provide back-up for Syria's armed forces in the Yom Kippur War in 1973.

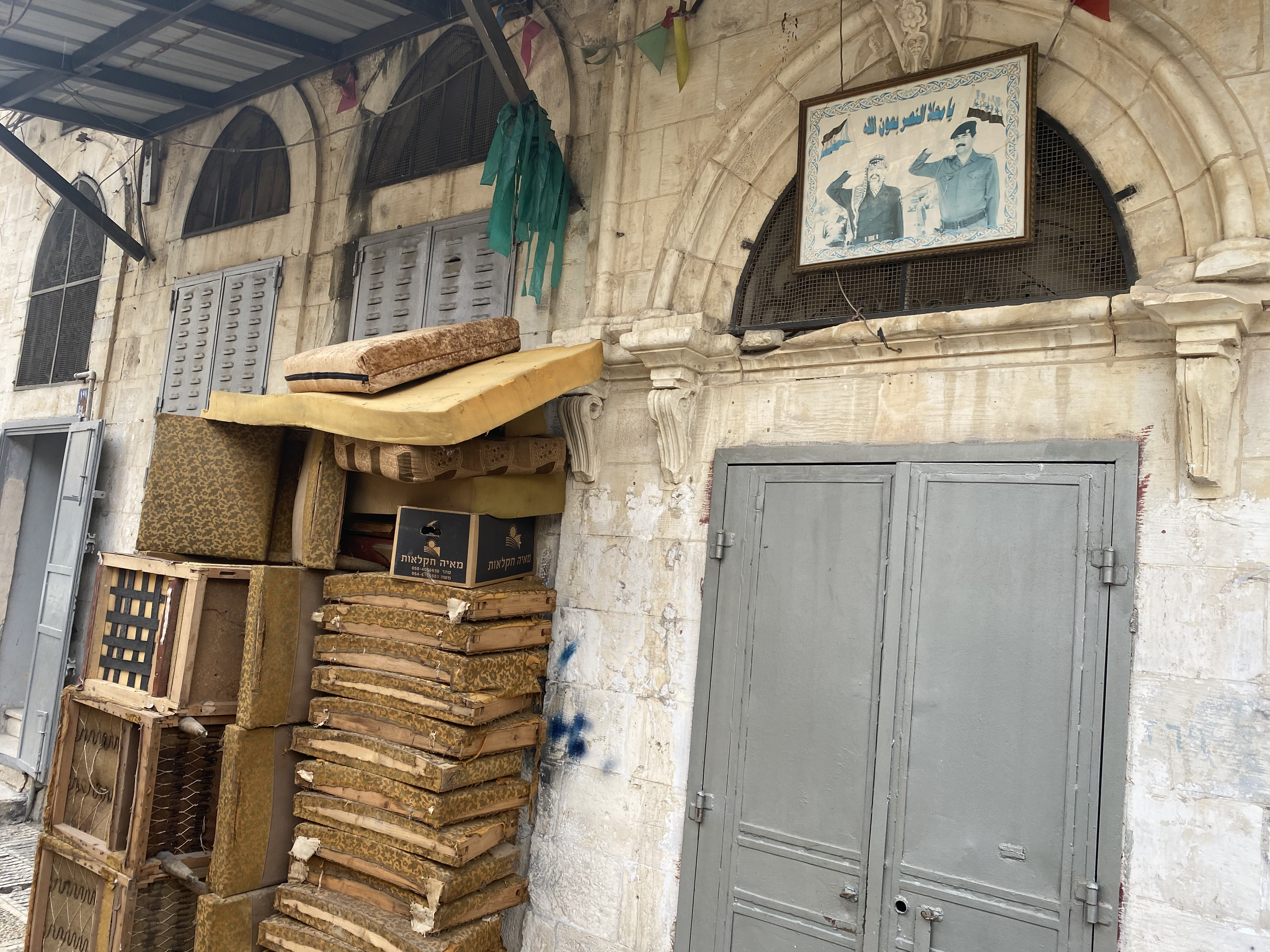
Yasser Arafat and Saddam Hussein's picture together hanging outside of a building in Nablus, West Bank

Saddam Hussein was widely revered in Arab nations for his anti-Israel stance and has supported several Palestinian guerrilla and militant organisations, and during the last Second Intifada, Iraq subsidized families of Palestinian martyrs. In 1991, Hussein's army fired 39 Scud missiles at Israel. However, Israel did not retaliate due to pressure exerted by the US and no further action has been taken from either side since.

According to British author Nigel Ashton, Israeli Prime Minister Yitzhak Rabin sent a message to Saddam Hussein through King Hussein of Jordan requesting a meeting between him and Saddam. Rabin hoped peace with Iraq might encourage Iran and Syria to do the same. Rabin was assassinated on November 4, 1995, ending the contact between governments. Rabin had previously supervised Operation Bramble Bush, a failed 1992 plan to assassinate Saddam with Sayeret Matkal commandos.

Former Iraqi Prime Minister Ayad Allawi said in 2004 that Iraq would not reconcile its differences with Israel.

During the 2008–2009 Israel-Gaza conflict, the Iraqi government condemned the attack, stating that: "the Iraqi government demands a halt to the military operations, that civilians’ lives are not unnecessarily exposed to danger and requests that the international community honour its responsibilities and take the required measures to stop the attack". The Dawa Party of Prime Minister Nouri al-Maliki called on Islamic countries to cut relations with Israel and end all "secret and public talks" with it. Also the Iraqi Shia leader Ali al-Sistani has called for decisive action by Arab and Muslim states for an end to Israeli attacks on Gaza. Though he condemned the operation, he stated that "supporting our brothers only with words is meaningless, considering the big tragedy they are facing." After the 2010 Gaza flotilla raid, an Iraqi government official, MP Khairallah al-Basri (a member of current premier Nouri al-Maliki's State of Law Coalition), condemned the attack and described it as a "new humanitarian disaster" as well as "a violation of human rights and a breach of international standards and norms." On July 1, 2012, Iraqi Prime Minister Nouri al-Maliki said that Iraq will establish diplomatic relations with all sovereign United Nations member states except Israel. He said that Iraq does not discriminate against any country but he rejected the idea of establishing any cultural, economic, military, or political ties with the Jewish state. During the November 2012 Operation Pillar of Defense in the Gaza Strip, Iraq's envoy to the Arab League called on the Arab countries to "use the weapon of oil, with the aim of asserting real pressure on the United States and whoever stands with Israel".

In 2017, the Palestinian city of Qalqilya named a street after Saddam Hussein and erected a memorial with his likeness. The monument was unveiled at a ceremony attended by the Qalqilya District Governor and two other Palestinian officials. It bears the slogan "Saddam Hussein – The Master of the Martyrs in Our Age".

== Palestinians of Iraq ==
Until 2003, Palestinians in Iraq were divided into three main groups according to the date of their migration there. The first group were the refugees of 1948 and their children and grandchildren - the largest group. The second group were the refugees after the 1967 war. The last group were those who left Kuwait after the Iraqi invasion in 1990 by force. However, this presence remained limited to a few thousand compared to the size of the Palestinian presence in neighboring countries such as Jordan, Syria and Lebanon.

Iraq is not a party to the 1951 Convention and the Refugee Law, so the Iraqi authorities did not consider the Palestinians as refugees. However, they received assistance from the Iraqi Ministry of Defense and the Iraqi Ministry of Labor and Social Affairs. The Iraqi government provided protection to the Palestinians and provided them with a high level of treatment, according to the Casablanca Protocol of the League of Arab States in 1965. They were granted travel documents, and they had the right to work, full rights to health, education and other government services, and to own and rent homes. The Palestinians stood side by side with the Iraqis in the wars and the decline in living standards as a result of the blockade imposed on Iraq before the 2003 war.

== 2003 - Present ==
After the US invasion of Iraq, only 7,500 refugees out of 35,000 Palestinians remained there, according to UN estimates, most of whom left their homes after organized campaigns by armed militias and US forces, to camps in the desert near the Syrian and Jordanian borders, and then to various countries including Brazil, the United States, New Zealand, Sweden, Cyprus and neighboring Arab countries, in a move condemned by international organizations and humanitarian organizations in the world, as Amnesty International condemned the violations of Palestinian refugees' rights in Iraq, while denouncing the failure of the Iraqi government and US forces to work to protect them, and it also issued an appeal to save them. In addition, the Palestine Liberation Organization office was closed immediately after the occupation, in addition to the offices of Palestinian organizations in Iraq, and the Palestinian embassy building for several months, after it was bombed with several shells, with the minimum of its representatives remaining. The dominant feature of the organization's role in Iraq towards Palestinian refugees is the lack of serious interest in the matter, despite the visit of Palestinian President Mahmoud Abbas to Iraq (which was the first visit by a Palestinian leader to Baghdad since the Second Gulf War and the imposition of the international blockade on Iraq), and the Palestinian embassy in Baghdad providing shelter to about 300 Palestinian families in buildings belonging to it and to the Fatah movement and the Palestine Liberation Organization, which set up a camp for this purpose in the sports stadium of the Haifa Club, which in turn is affiliated with the Palestine Liberation Organization.

In contrast, the new Iraqi government expressed its support for the establishment of an independent Palestinian state on the borders of the West Bank and the Gaza Strip and supported Palestine's request to be a member of the United Nations. Prominent Iraqi political figures also expressed their support for the unity of the Palestinian people with all its factions, and for their uprising against the Israeli occupation and its cause. A counter-current to this approach emerged among a small group of Iraqi politicians, who considered the Palestinians a fifth column defending the rule of the former regime. Some of them went so far as to demand their expulsion from Iraq.

On the popular and sports level, the Iraqi national football team played its first international matches on home soil since 2003 against its Palestinian counterpart in Erbil in 2009, an event that was an important indicator of the return of normal life to Iraq. On January 28, 2017, Safiya Al-Suhail, Iraq's ambassador to Jordan, presented her credentials to Palestinian President Mahmoud Abbas as a non-resident ambassador of Iraq to the State of Palestine. On February 9, 2021, Haider Mansour Al-Athari presented his credentials as a non-resident ambassador extraordinary and plenipotentiary to Palestine to the Palestinian Minister of Foreign Affairs and Expatriates, Riyad Al-Maliki, in the Jordanian capital, Amman.

On July 9, 2023, the first political consultations session between the two countries was held in the Iraqi capital, Baghdad.

== See also ==
- Iraq-Israel relations
- Palestinians in Iraq
