= Demographics of Lebanon =

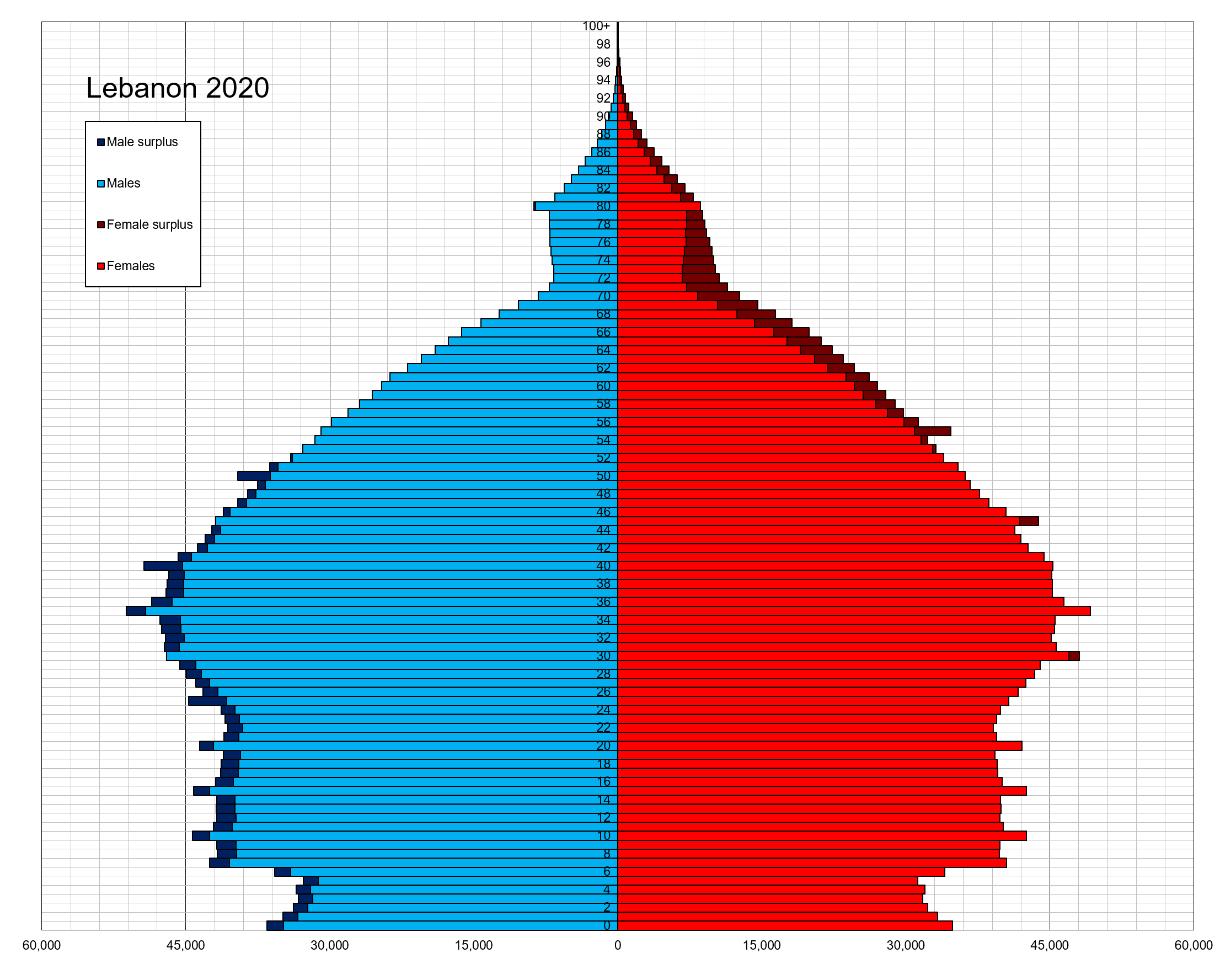
- Population pyramid of Lebanon in 2020
- Population: 5,469,612 (July 2020 est.), including 910,256 Syrians, 170,000 Palestinians, and 5,700 Iraqis (110th)
- Density: 741 people per.sq.km (2017 est.)
- Growth rate: -6.68% (2020 est.)
- Birth rate: 13.6 births/1,000 population (2020 est.)
- Death rate: 5.4 deaths/1,000 population (2020 est.)
- Life expectancy: 78.7 years (2020 est.)
  - male: 77.8 years (2020 est.)
  - female: 79.8 years (2020 est.)
- Fertility rate: 1.51 children born/woman (2025 est.)
- Infant mortality: 0.5 deaths/1,000 live births (2020 est.)
- Net migration rate: -0.9 migrant(s)/1,000 population (2024 est.)
- Immigrant share: 24.5% (2024)

Age structure
- 0–14 years: 23.32% (male 728,026 /female 694,453) (2018 est.)
- 15–64 years: 69.65% (male 2,139,885/male 2,108,917) (2018 est.)
- 65 and over: 7.03% (male 185,780/male 243,015) (2018 est.)

Sex ratio
- Total: 1 male/female (2017 est.)
- At birth: 1.05 male(s)/female (2017 est.)
- Under 15: 1.05 male(s)/female (2017 est.)
- 15–64 years: 1.03 male(s)/female (2014 est.)
- 65 and over: 0.79 male(s)/female (2017 est.)

Nationality
- Nationality: Lebanese
- Major ethnic: Arabs (95%); Lebanese (N/D); Lebanese Muslims (N/D); Shiites (N/D); Sunnis (N/D); Others (N/D); Lebanese Christians (N/D); Maronite Catholics (N/D); Greek Orthodox (N/D); Melkite Catholics (N/D); Protestants (N/D); Others (N/D); Lebanese Druze (N/D); Syrians (N/D); Palestinians (N/D); Alawites (N/D); Others (N/D)
- Minor ethnic: Armenians (4%); Other groups (1%)

Language
- Official: Arabic
- Spoken: Lebanese Arabic, English, French
- Minority languages include Armenian and Aramaic

Demographics of Lebanon
Indicator	Rank	Measure
Economy
GDP (PPP) per capita	66th	$19,500
Unemployment rate	↓ 21st	20.89%*
CO_{2} emissions	78th	3.05t^{†}
Electricity consumption	77th	49.72GWh
Economic Freedom	95th	2.98
Politics
Human Development Index	80th	0.757
Political freedom	Partly	4
Corruption (A higher score means less (perceived) corruption.)	↓ 134th	2.5
Press freedom	45th	74.00
Society
Literacy Rate	43rd	96.7%
Number of Internet users	59th	4,545,007 users
E-readiness	14th	7.16±
Ease of Doing Business	24th	Unknown
Health
Life Expectancy	59th	77.0
Birth rate	113th	15.6^{‡}
Fertility rate	157th	1.77^{††}
Infant mortality	127th	14.39^{‡‡}
Death rate	157th	7.5^{‡}
HIV/AIDS rate	127th	0.10%
Notes
* including several non-sovereign entities ↓ indicates rank is in reverse order (e.g. 1st is lowest)^{†} per capita^{±} score out of 10^{‡} per 1000 people^{††} per woman^{‡‡} per 1000 live births

This is a demography of the population of Lebanon including population density, education level, health of the populace, economic status, religious affiliations and other aspects of the population.

About 95% of the population of Lebanon is either Muslim or Christian, split across various sects and denominations. The only national census ever published was conducted in 1932 under the French Mandate, before the founding of the modern Lebanese state. The 1932 census identified, organized, and enumerated sects and determined the nascent body of citizens, which were recorded, managed, and produced through the national registries also forged at that time. Consequently, there is an absence of accurate data on the relative percentages of the population of the major religions and groups. The system of census taking under the French Mandate, based on the legal categories of sex, sect, and kinship, remains largely in place today. The 1932 census did not simply measure sectarian identities but helped institutionalize them as political categories. Because sectarian political representation in Lebanon depends on demographic ratios, scholars have highlighted that conducting a new census could destabilize the political system, as updated statistics could challenge existing power-sharing arrangements. Therefore, religious affiliation in Lebanon is not only a matter of personal belief but also a legal category recorded in state registries and linked to personal status law, also family law, including marriage, divorce, and inheritance.

The absence of data and comprehensive statistics also concerns all other demographic studies unrelated to religious balance, due to the all but total inactivity of the concerned public agencies. The only recent (post-war) statistics available are estimates based on studies made by private organizations.

The biggest study made after the independence on the Lebanese Population was made by the Central Administration of Statistics (in French: "Administration Centrale de la Statistique") under the direction of Robert Kasparian and Grégoire Haddad's Social Movement: "L'enquête par sondage sur la population active au Liban en 1970" (in English: "The survey on the active population in Lebanon in 1970"). It was conducted on a sample of 130,000 individuals.

There are between 10 and 15 million Lebanese and descendants of Lebanese worldwide, mostly Christians, compared with the internal population of Lebanon of around 4.6 million citizens, in 2020.

== Ethnic groups ==
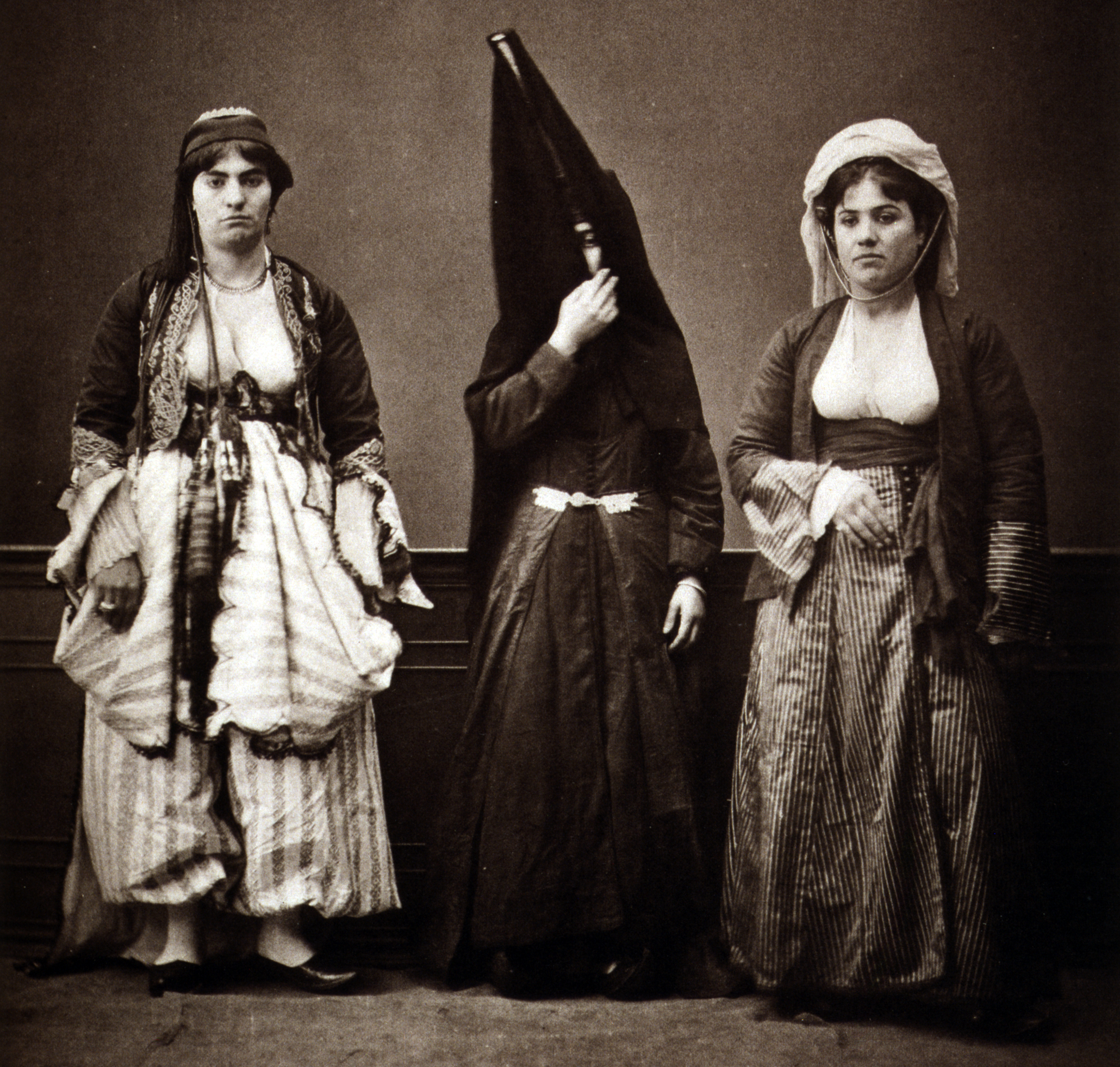
Three Lebanese women in 1873.

Ethnic identity revolves increasingly around aspects of cultural self-identification more than descent. To an extent, religious affiliation has also become a substitute in some respects for ethnic affiliation. Generally, the cultural and linguistic heritage of the People of Lebanon is a blend of both indigenous elements and the foreign cultures that have come to rule the land and its people over the course of thousands of years. Moreover, in a 2013 interview, the lead investigator, Pierre Zalloua, pointed out that genetic variation preceded religious variation and divisions: "Lebanon already had well-differentiated communities with their own genetic peculiarities, but not significant differences, and religions came as layers of paint on top. There is no distinct pattern that shows that one community carries significantly more Phoenician than another".

== Religious groups ==
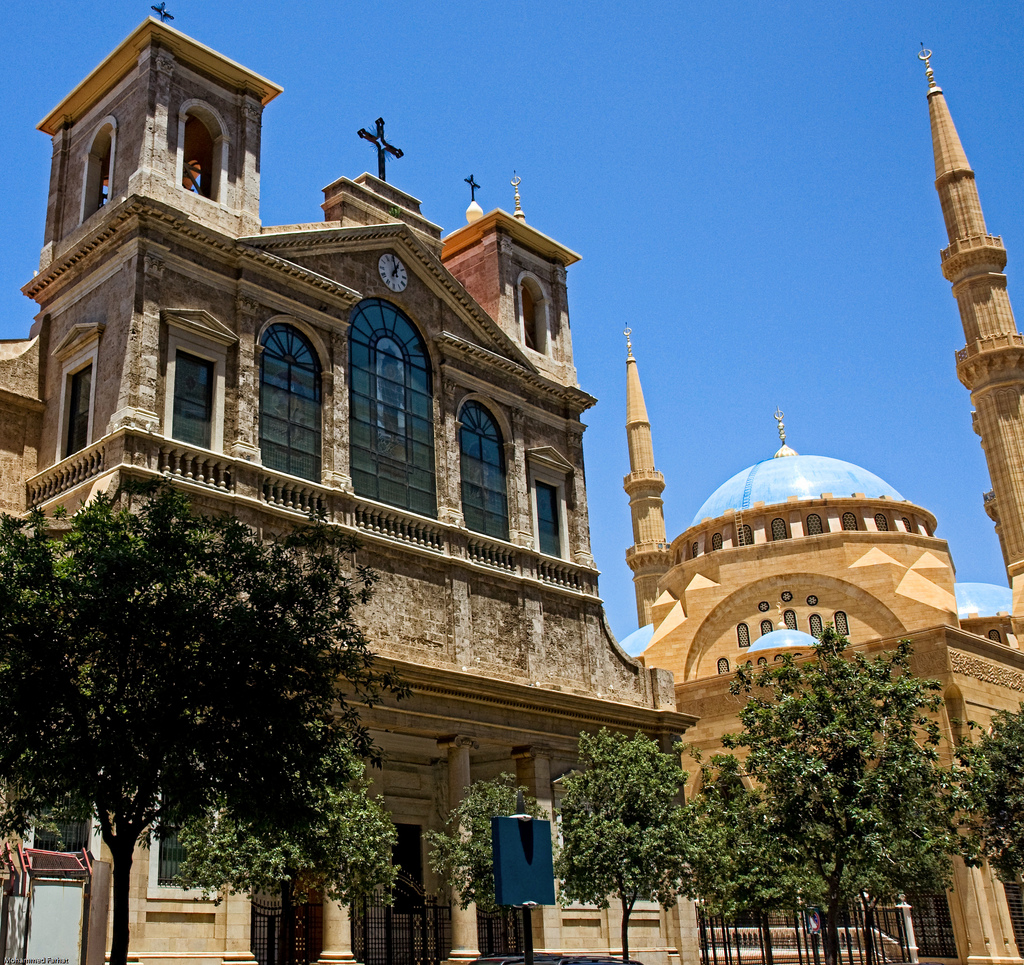
Saint George Maronite Cathedral and the Mohammad Al-Amin Mosque, Beirut.

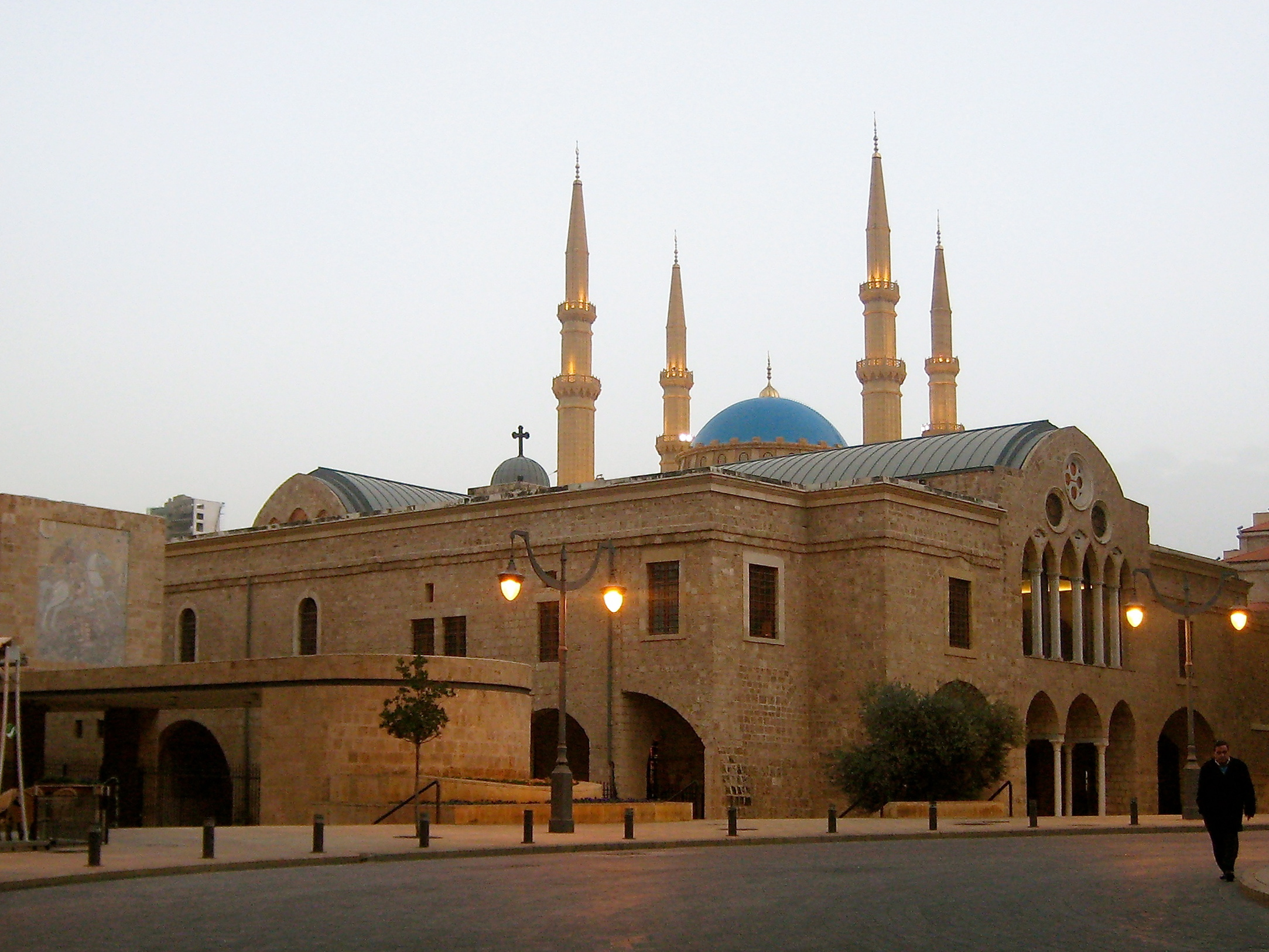
View of the Saint George Greek Orthodox Cathedral in Beirut.

Statistics quoted in 2023 indicate that 32.2% are Shia, 31.2% are Sunni, 16.0% are Maronite, 7.6% are Greek Orthodox, 5.5% are Druze, 0.6% are Alawites and Ismailis combined, with the rest belonging to other Christian and Muslim sects.

=== The sectarian system ===
Lebanon's religious divisions are complex, and the country is made up by a multitude of religious groupings. While rivalries among local elites existed earlier, the political order in Mount Lebanon before the mid-19th century was largely structured through hierarchical patronage networks rather than sectarian ideology. Scholars argue that modern sectarianism emerged in the mid-19th century at the intersection of the Egyptian occupation (1831–1840), the decline of the Shihab emirate, the Ottoman Tanzimat reforms, and increased European intervention.

The pattern of settlement has changed little since the 7th century, but instances of civil strife and ethnic cleansing, most recently during the Lebanese Civil War, has brought some important changes to the religious map of the country. (See also History of Lebanon.)

Lebanon has by far the largest proportion of Christians of any Middle Eastern country, but both Christians and Muslims are sub-divided into many splinter sects and denominations. Population statistics are highly controversial. The various denominations and sects each have vested interests in inflating their own numbers. Shias, Sunnis, Maronites and Eastern Orthodox (the four largest denominations) all often claim that their particular religious affiliation holds a majority in the country, adding up to over 150% of the total population, even before counting the other denominations. One of the rare things that most Lebanese religious leaders will agree on is to avoid a new general census, for fear that it could trigger a new round of denominational conflict. The last official census was performed in 1932.

Religion has traditionally been of overriding importance in defining the Lebanese population. Dividing state power between the religious denominations and sects, and granting religious authorities judicial power, dates back to Ottoman times (the millet system). The practice was reinforced during French mandate, when Christian groups were granted privileges. This system of government, while partly intended as a compromise between sectarian demands, has caused tensions that still dominate Lebanese politics to this day.

The Christian population majority is believed to have ended in the early 1970s, but government leaders would agree to no change in the political power balance. This led to Muslim demands for increased representation, and the constant sectarian tension slid into violent conflict in 1958 (prompting U.S. intervention) and again in the grueling Lebanese Civil War, in 1975–90.

The balance of power has been slightly adjusted in the 1943 National Pact, an informal agreement struck at independence, in which positions of power were divided according to the 1932 census. The Sunni elite was then accorded more power, but Maronites continued to dominate the system. The sectarian balance was again adjusted towards the Muslim side but simultaneously further reinforced and legitimized. Shia Muslims (by now the second largest sect) then gained additional representation in the state apparatus, and the obligatory Christian-Muslim representation in Parliament was downgraded from a 6:5 to a 1:1 ratio. Christians of various denominations were then generally thought to constitute about 40% of the population, although often Muslim leaders would cite lower numbers, and some Christians would claim that they still held a majority of the population.

==== 18 recognized religious groups ====
The present Lebanese Constitution officially acknowledges 18 religious groups (see below). These have the right to handle family law according to their courts and traditions, and they are the basic players in Lebanon's complex sectarian politics.

- Alawite
- Armenian Catholic
- Armenian Orthodox
- Assyrian Church of the East
- Chaldean Catholic
- Copts
- Druze
- Greek Orthodox
- Isma'ili
- Jewish
- Latin Catholic
- Maronite Catholic
- Melkite Greek Catholic
- Protestant
- Sunni
- Shia
- Syriac Catholic Church
- Syriac Orthodox Church

=== Religious population statistics ===
Distribution of religious groups of Lebanon according to 2009 municipal election data with the boundaries of ancient Mount Lebanon Mutasarrifate marked with a dotted line

The 1932 census stated that Christians made up 50% of the resident population. Maronites, the largest among the Christian denomination and then largely in control of the state apparatus, accounted for 29% of the total resident population.

The total population of Lebanon was reported to be 1,411,000 in 1956. The largest communities were Maronites (424,000), Sunni Muslims (286,000), Shiite Muslims (250,000), Greek Orthodox (149,000), Greek Catholics (91,000), Druzes (88,000), Armenian Orthodox (64,000), Armenian Catholics (15,000), Protestants (14,000), Jews (7,000), Syriac Catholics (6,000), Syriac Orthodox (5,000), Latins (4,000) and Assyrians of the Church of the East (1,000).

A 2010 study conducted by Statistics Lebanon, a Beirut-based research firm, cited by the United States Department of State found that Lebanon's population of approximately 4.3 million was estimated to be:

- 40.5% Christian (21% Maronite, 8% Greek Orthodox, 5% Melkite Catholic, 6.5% belonging to smaller Christian groups (Protestant, Armenian Orthodox, Armenian Catholic, Syriac Orthodox, Syriac Catholic, Roman Catholic, Chaldean Catholic, Assyrian Church of the East, and Copt)
- At least 54% Islam (27% Shia, 27% Sunni, Alawites, Ismaili)
- 5.6% Druze (included with the Muslim group in the Lebanese constitution)

There is also a very small number of other religious minorities such as, Baháʼís, Buddhists, Hindus, Jews, and Mormons.

In 2023, the United States Department of State cited study conducted by Statistics Lebanon, a Beirut-based research firm, estimating Lebanon's population to be 69.3% Muslim (32.2% Shia; 31.2% Sunni; 5.5% Druze; 0.6% Alawites and Ismailis combined) and 30.5% Christian. 52.5% of Christians are Maronite and 25% Greek Orthodox, and other Christian groups include Greek Catholics (Melkites), Armenian Orthodox, Armenian Catholics, Syriac Orthodox, Syriac Catholics, Assyrians, Chaldean Catholics, Copts, Protestants (including Presbyterians, Baptists, and Seventh-day Adventists), Roman (Latin) Catholics, and members of the Church of Jesus Christ.

Census of 1932
	Residents	Emigrants before 30/08/1924		Emigrants after 30/08/1924	
	Residents	paying taxes	does not pay	paying taxes	does not pay
Sunni	178,100	2,653	9,840	1,089	3,623
Shi'i	155,035	2,977	4,543	1,770	2,220
Druze	53,334	2,067	3,205	1,183	2,295
Maronite	227,800	31,697	58,457	11,434	21,809
Greek Catholic	46,709	7,190	16,544	1,855	4,038
Greek Orthodox	77,312	12,547	31,521	3,922	9,041
Protestant	6,869	607	1,575	174	575
Armenian Orthodox	26,102	1	60	191	1,718
Armenian Catholic	5,890	9	50	20	375
Syriac Orthodox	2,723	6	34	3	54
Syriac Catholic	2,803	9	196	6	101
Jews	3,588	6	214	7	188
Chaldean Orthodox	190	0	0	0	0
Chaldean Catholic	548	0	6	0	19
Miscellaneous	6,393	212	758	59	234
Total	793,396	59,981	127,003	21,713	46,290
Foreigners	61,297				

==== Muslims ====
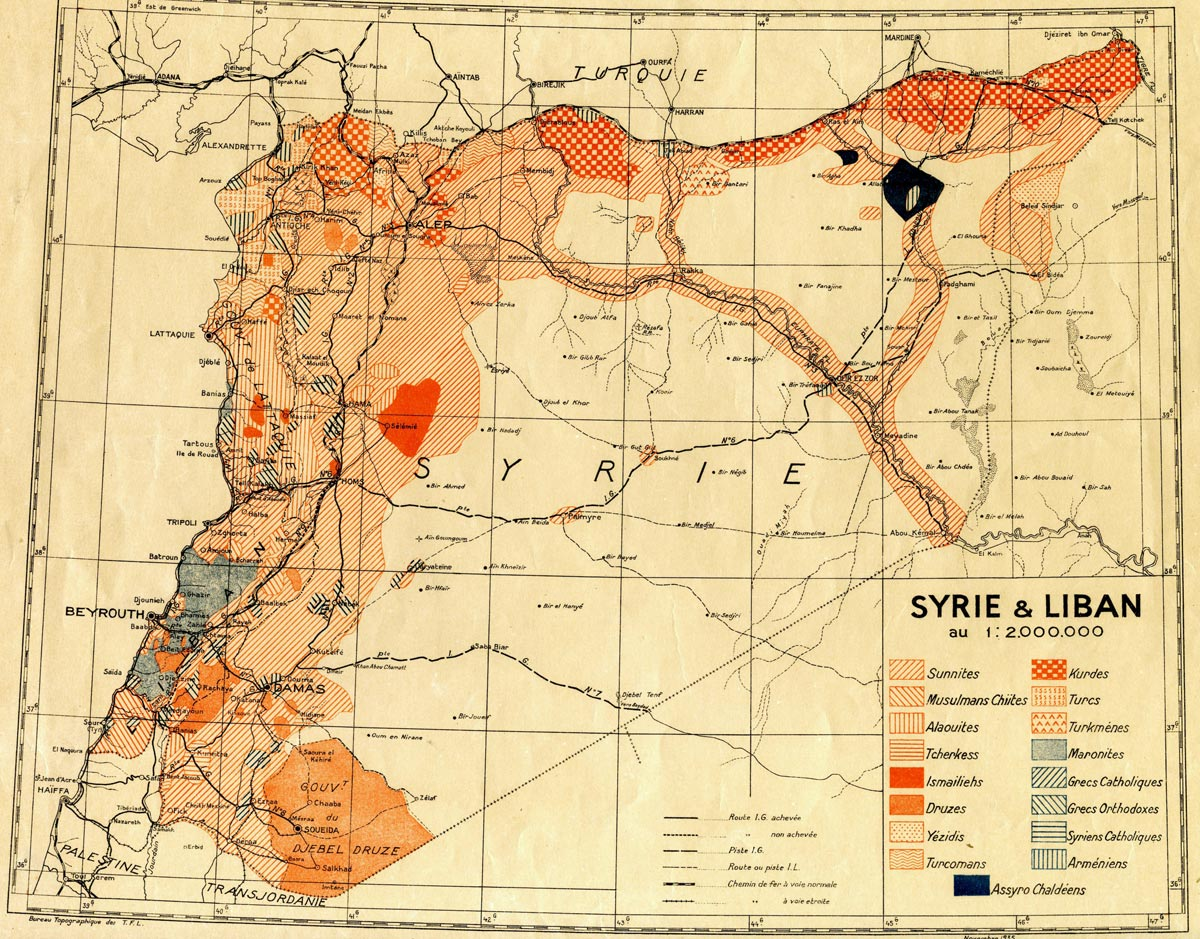
A map of religious and ethnic communities of Syria and Lebanon (1935)

According to a Statistics Lebanon study quoted by the US State Department, the Muslim population was estimated at 69.3% within Lebanese territory. Other sources put Muslims at 20% of the over 4 million Lebanese diaspora population. In 2012 a more detailed breakdown of the size of each Muslim sect in Lebanon was made:

- Shia Muslims are around 32.2% of the total population; the vast majority belong to the Twelver branch of Shi'ism. The Speaker of Parliament is always a Shia Muslim, as it is the only high post that Shias are eligible for. Shiites are largely concentrated in the Beqaa Valley, Southern Lebanon and in Dahieh (Greater Beirut).
- Sunni Muslims constitute about 31.2% of the total population. Sunnis are the only sect eligible for the post of Prime Minister Sunnis are mainly concentrated in West Beirut, North Lebanon, Sidon, Central and Western Beqaa, and Akkar in the north.
- Other Muslim sects have a small presence, with the Isma'ilis and Alawites combined comprising less than 1% of the population and are included among Lebanese Shia Muslims. Alawites are eligible for two seats in the Lebanese parliament, representing Alawites of Akkar and Tripoli.

==== Christians ====
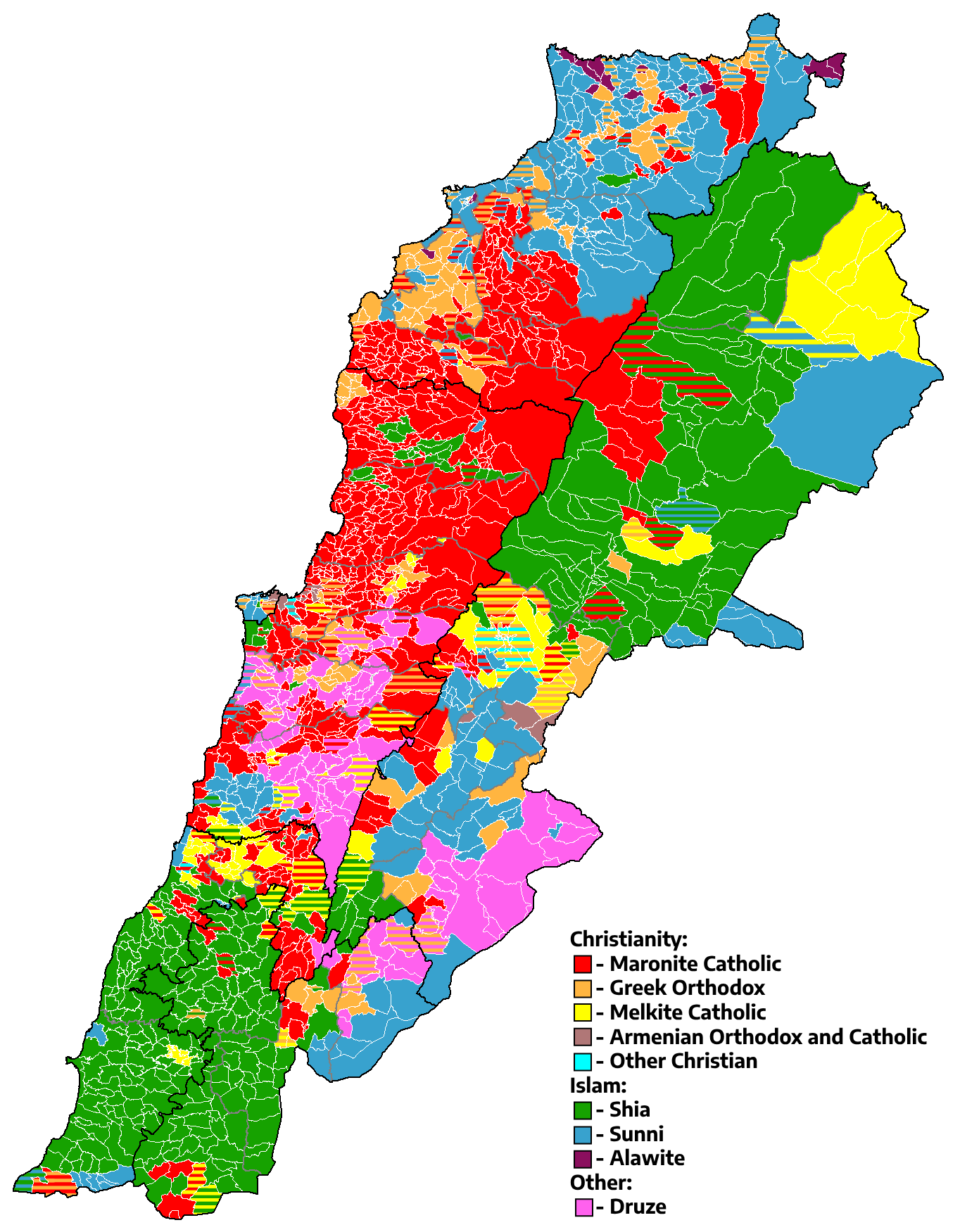
Religion map of Lebanon by municipality according to municipal elections data.

According to a Statistics Lebanon study quoted by the US State Department in 2023, the Christian population was estimated at 30.5% within Lebanese territory. In 2012 a more detailed breakdown of the size of each Christian sect in Lebanon was made:

- Maronite Christians are the largest of the Christian groups who in total account for about 52.5% of the Christian population of Lebanon. They are Eastern Catholics in full communion with Rome, but have their own patriarch, liturgy, and customs. Traditionally they had good relations with the Western world, especially France and the Vatican. After 1920 they traditionally dominated the Lebanese government and civil positions, although their influence significantly diminished following the Lebanese Civil War and Taif Agreement. Today the Maronites are believed to compose about 26% of the population, concentrated mainly in the province of Mount Lebanon and Eastern Beirut (Greater Beirut).
- The second largest Christian group is the Eastern Orthodox that constitute 25% of the Christian population. The Orthodox church is existent in other parts of the Arab world, especially in Syria and among Palestinian Christians. Orthodox Christians were often noted for their Pan-Arab and Pan-Syrian leanings, and have close relations with Eastern Orthodox European countries like Greece, Cyprus, Russia, Ukraine, Bulgaria, Serbia and Romania. The positions of Deputy Speaker of Parliament and Deputy Prime Minister are reserved for Eastern Orthodox Christians.
- The Melkite Catholics are present in Lebanon.
- The Protestants are present in Lebanon
- The remaining Christian churches are Roman Catholics, Armenian Apostolic, Armenian Catholic, Syriac Orthodox, Syriac Catholic, and Assyrians.

==== Druze ====
The Druze constitute 5.5% of the population and are almost entirely concentrated in Aley and Chouf in southern Mount Lebanon, and in the Hasbaya and Rashaya districts. Even though the faith originally developed out of Isma'ili Shia Islam, most Druze do not identify as Muslims, and do not accept the five pillars of Islam.

==== Other religions ====
Other religions account for only an estimated 0.3% of the population mainly foreign temporary workers, according to the CIA World Factbook. There was a large and vibrant Jewish population, traditionally centered in Beirut who fled to Israel in the 1940s and 1950s.

== Diaspora ==
Prominent Lebanese Figures وجوه من لبنان
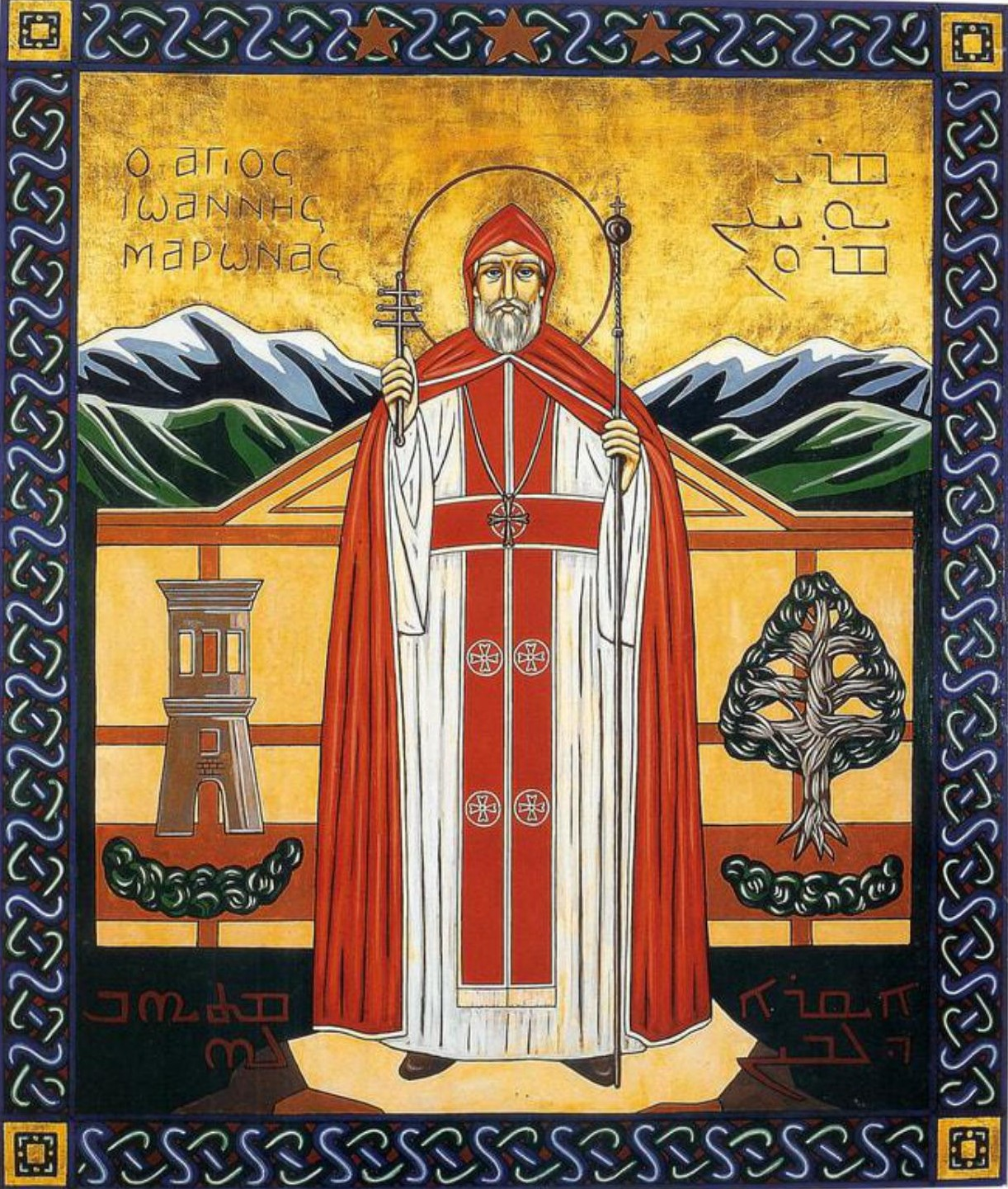

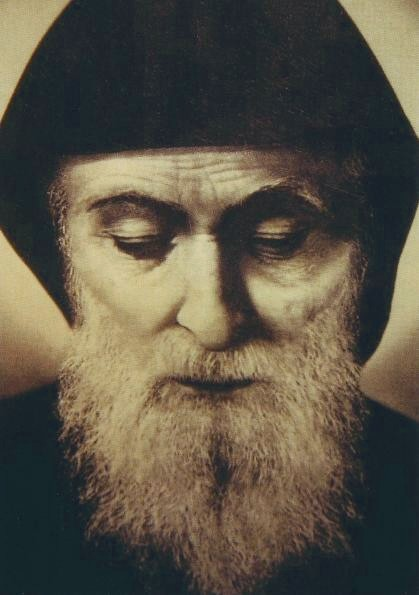

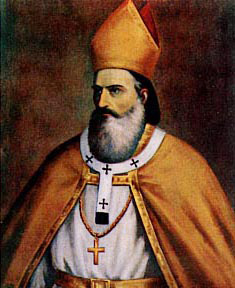

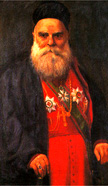

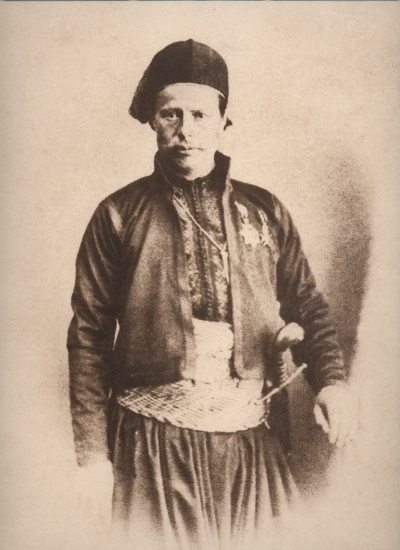

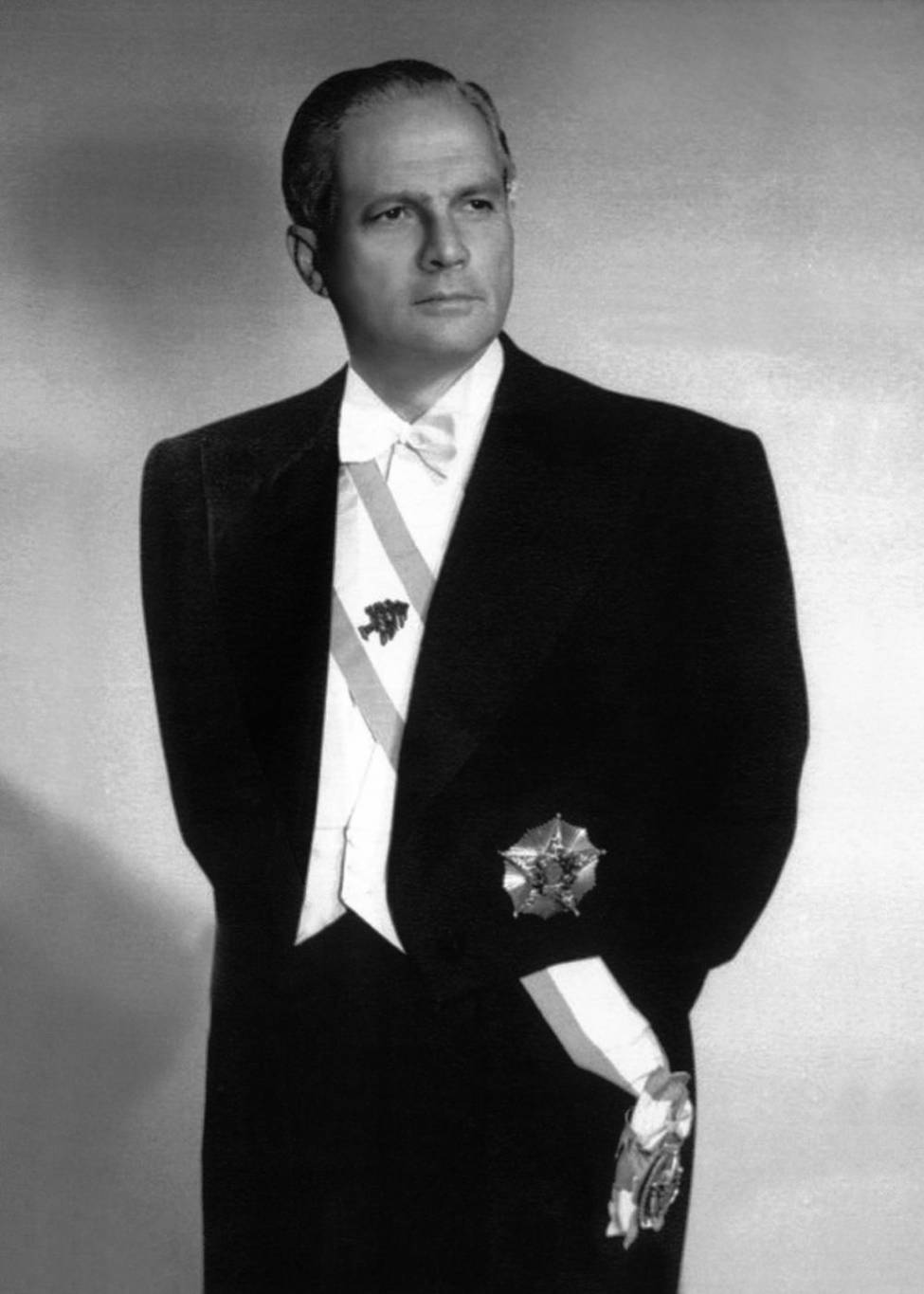

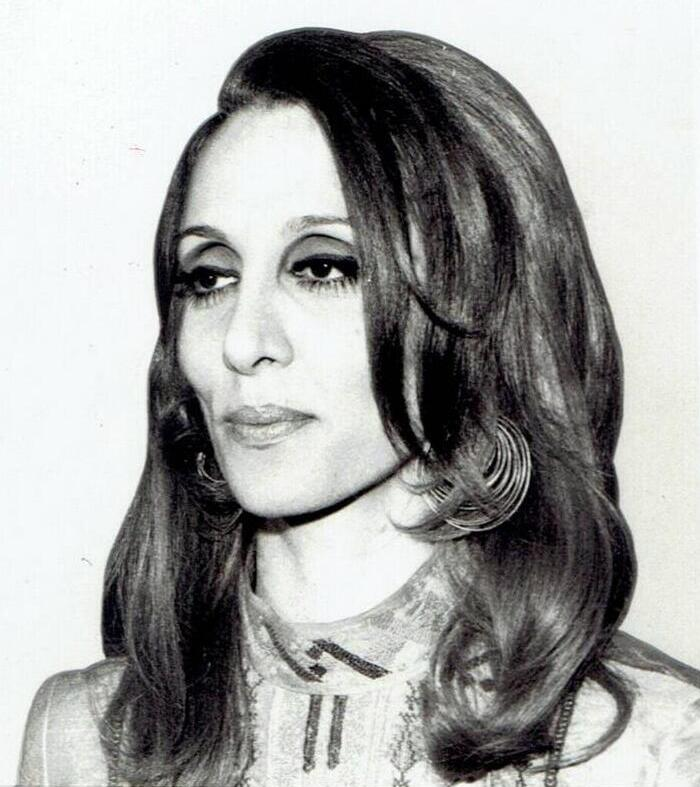

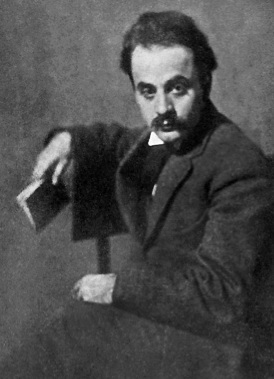

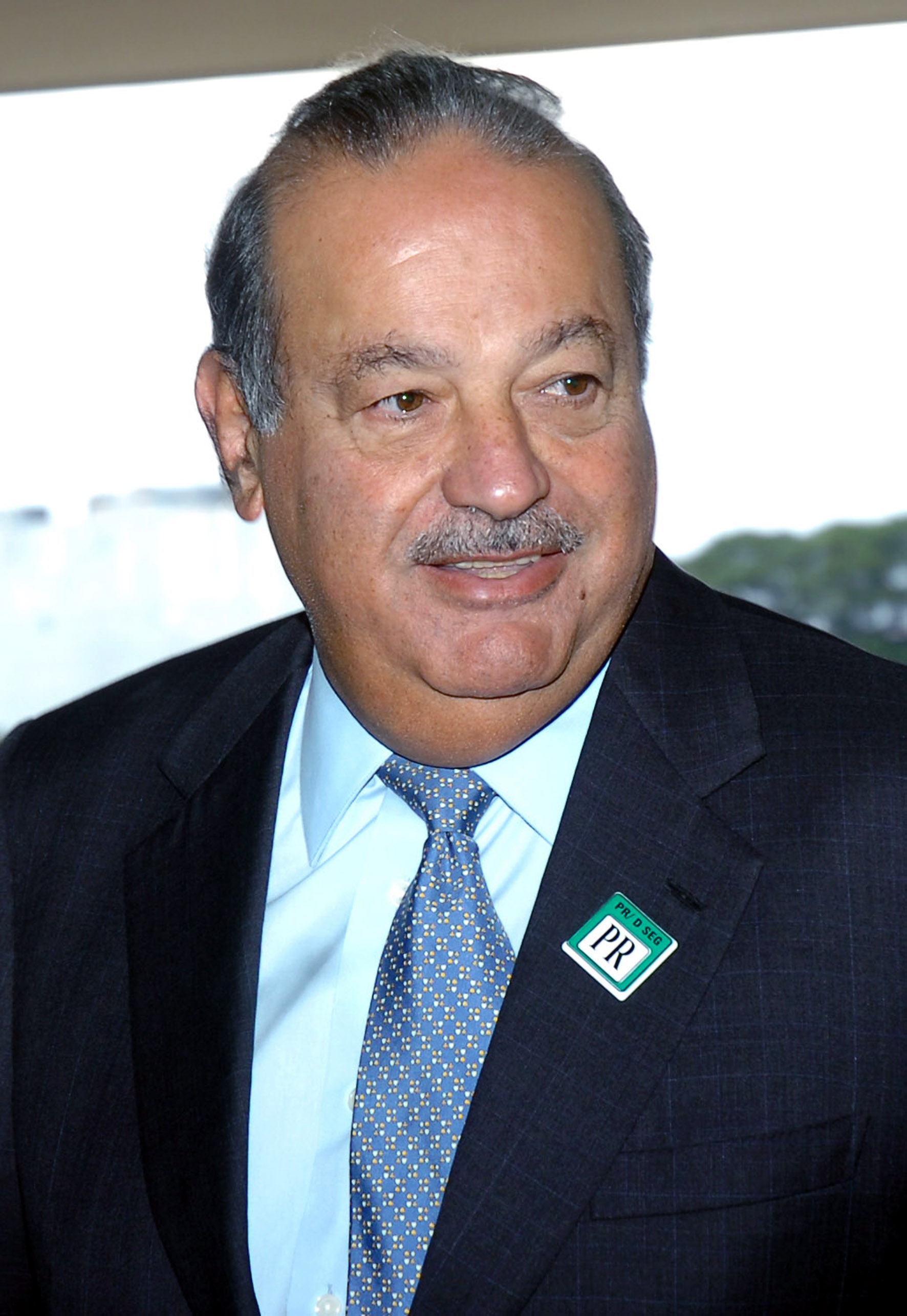

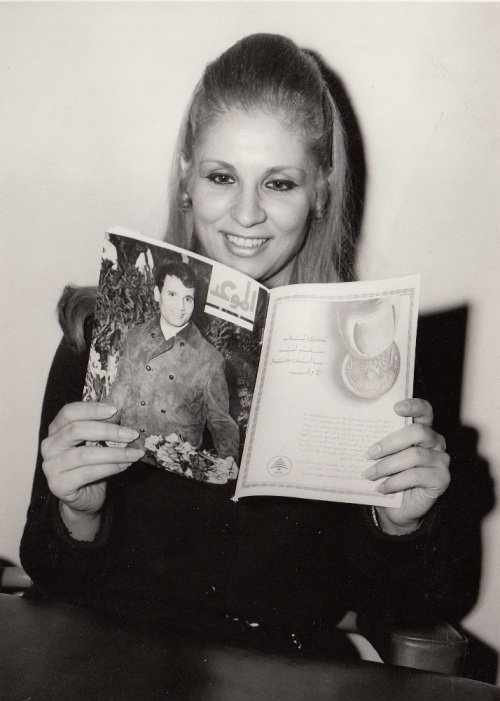

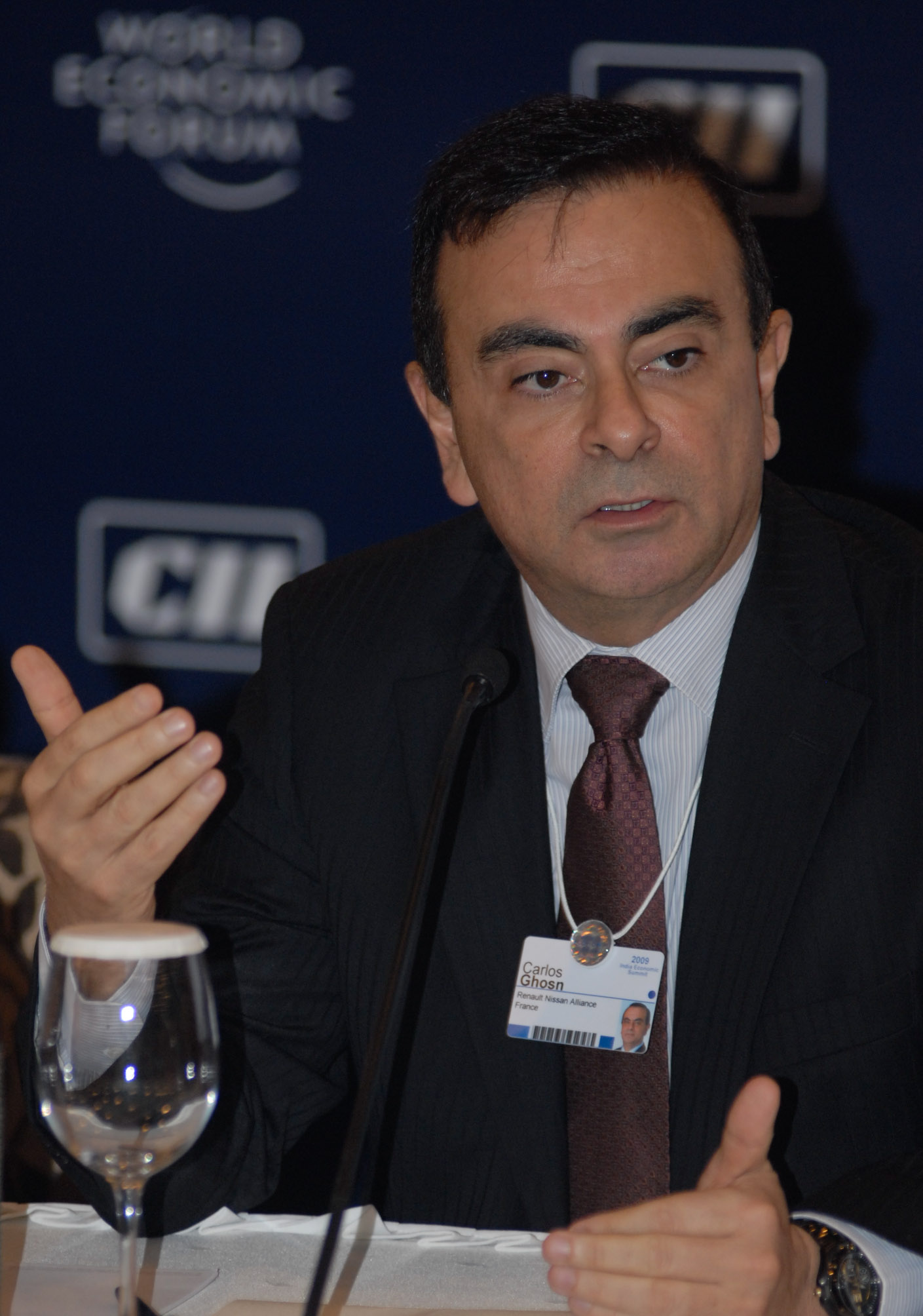

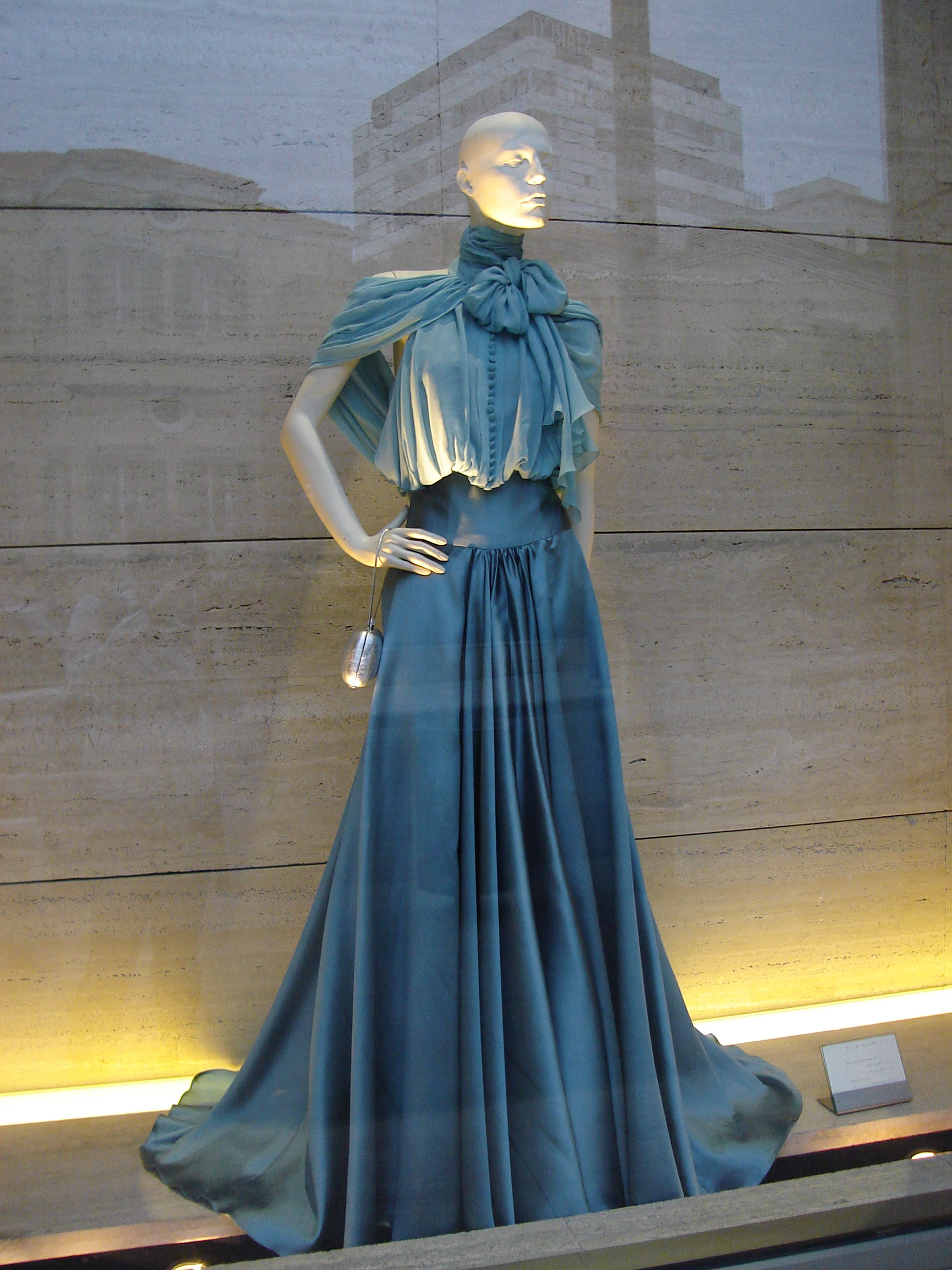

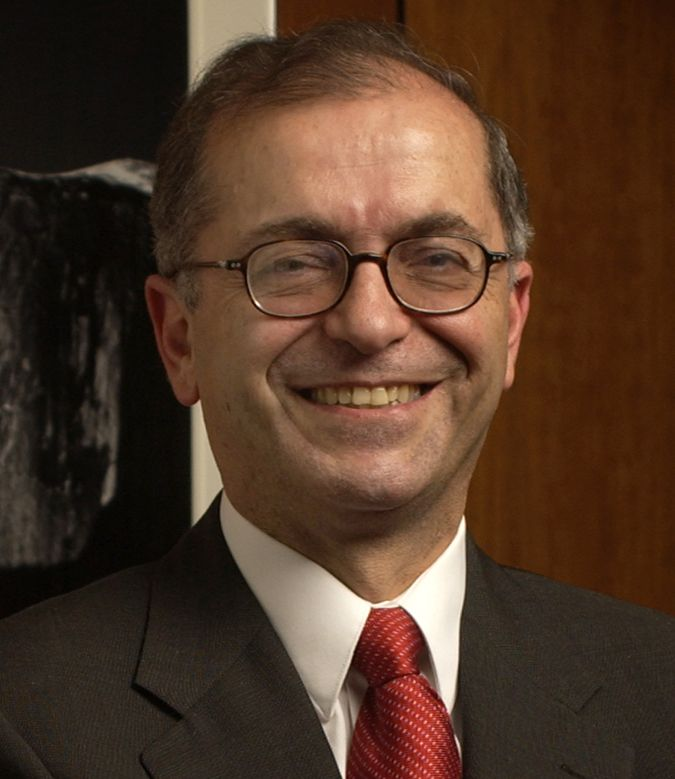

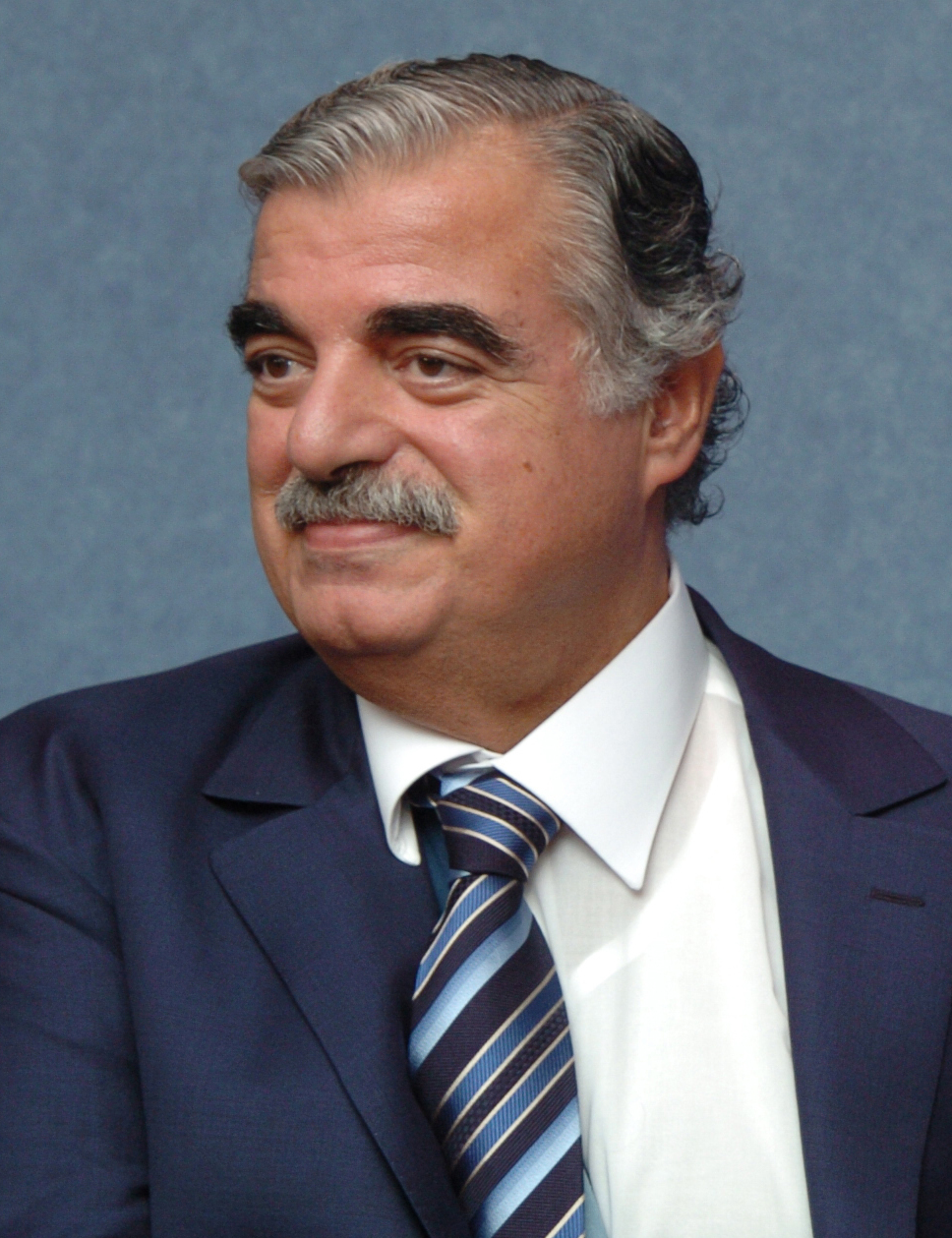

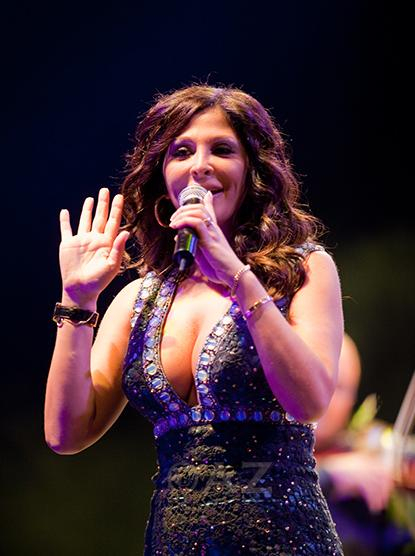

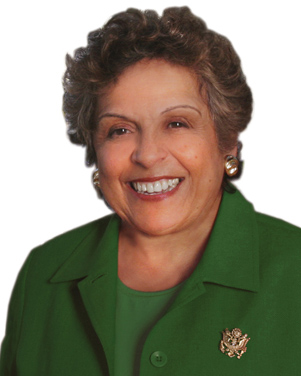

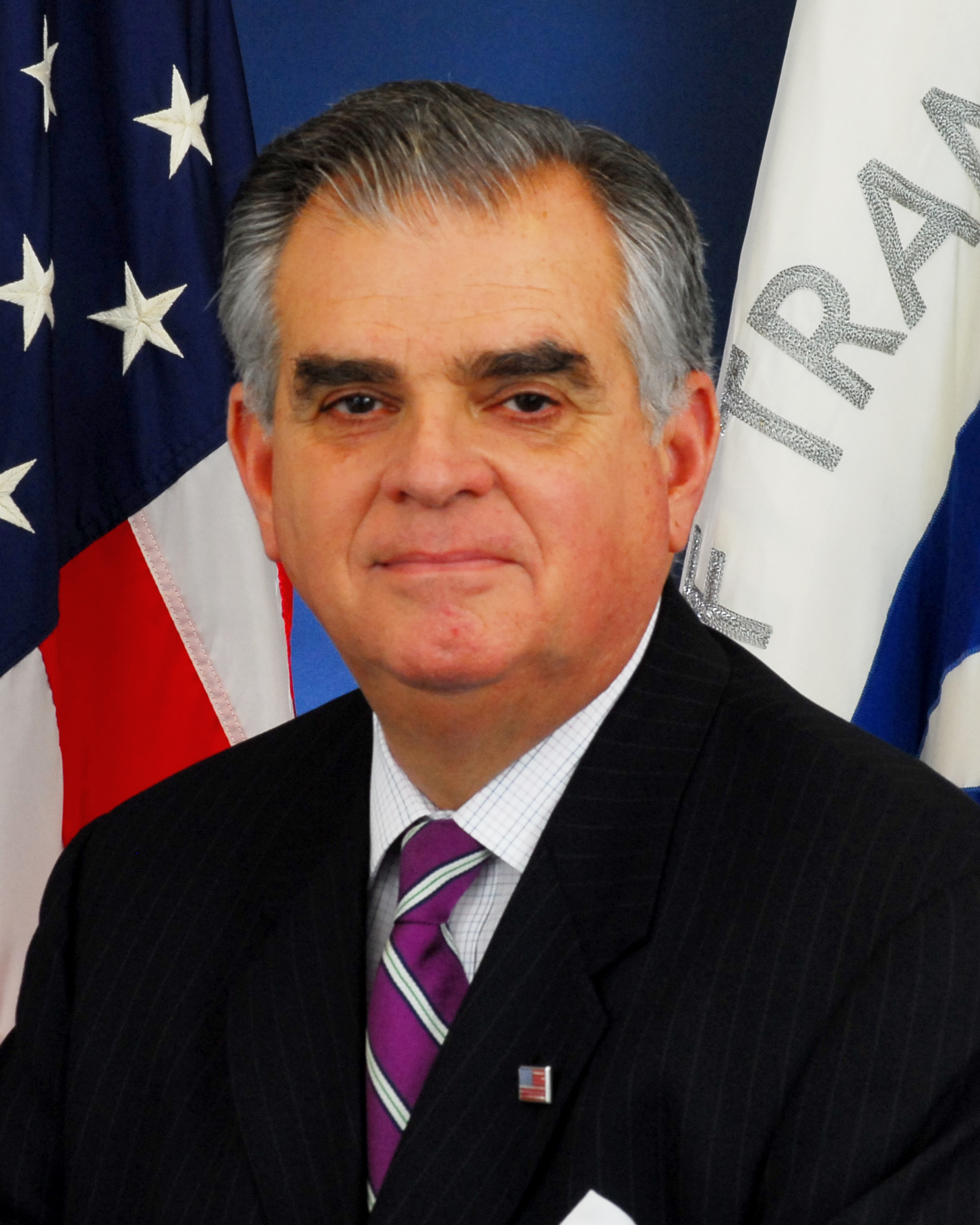

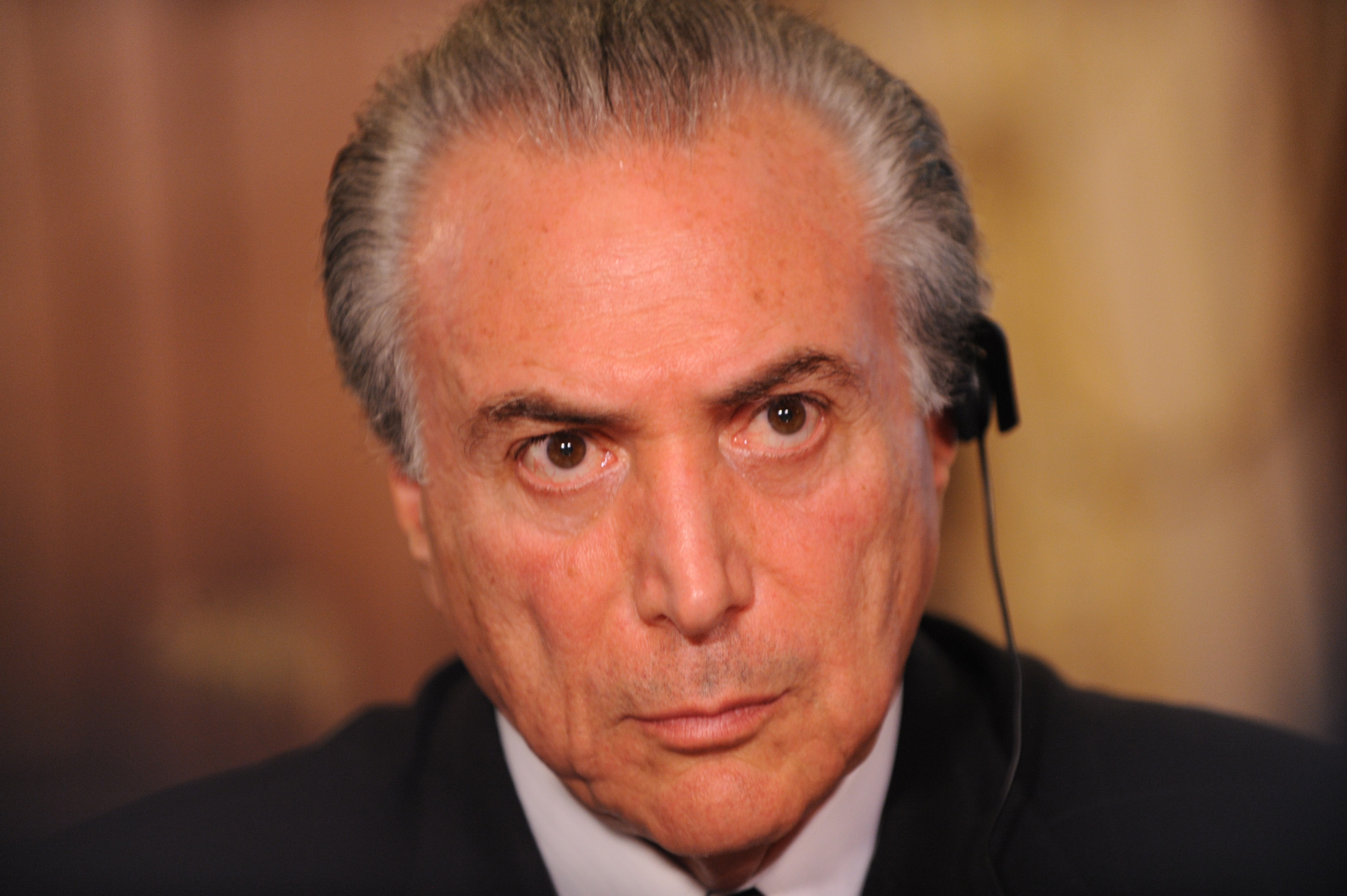

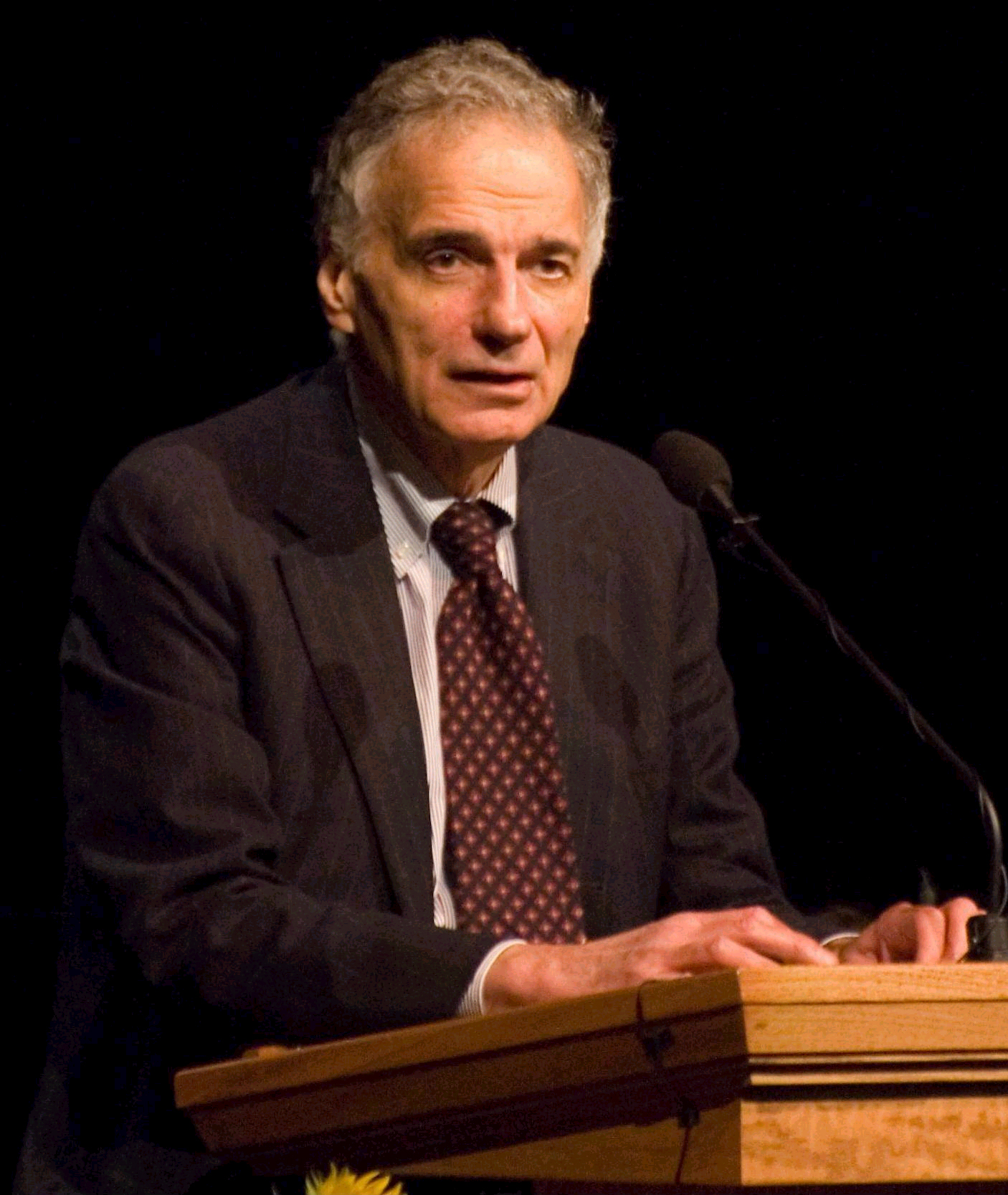

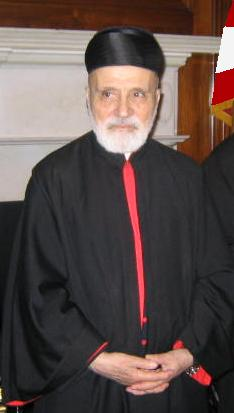

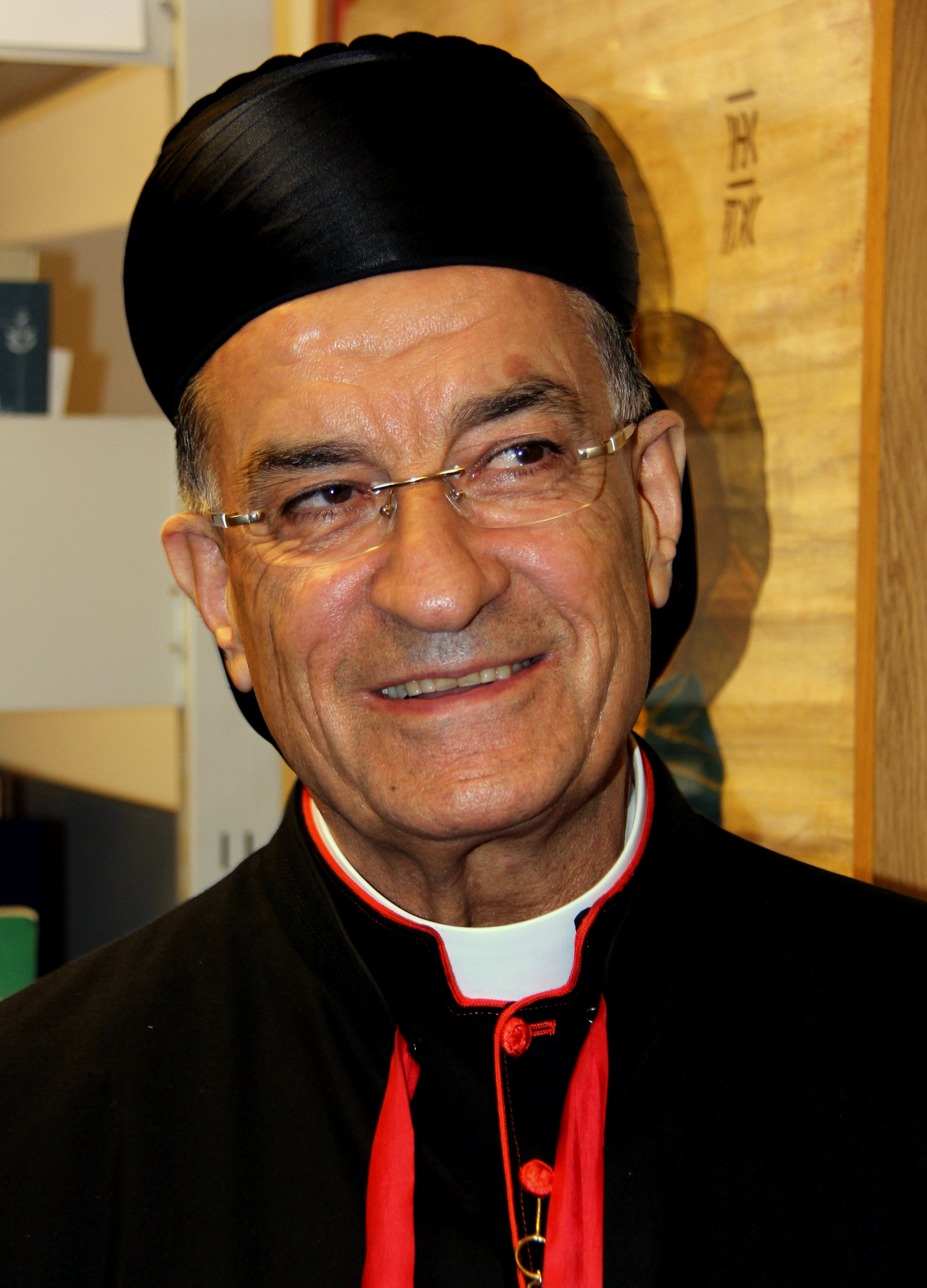

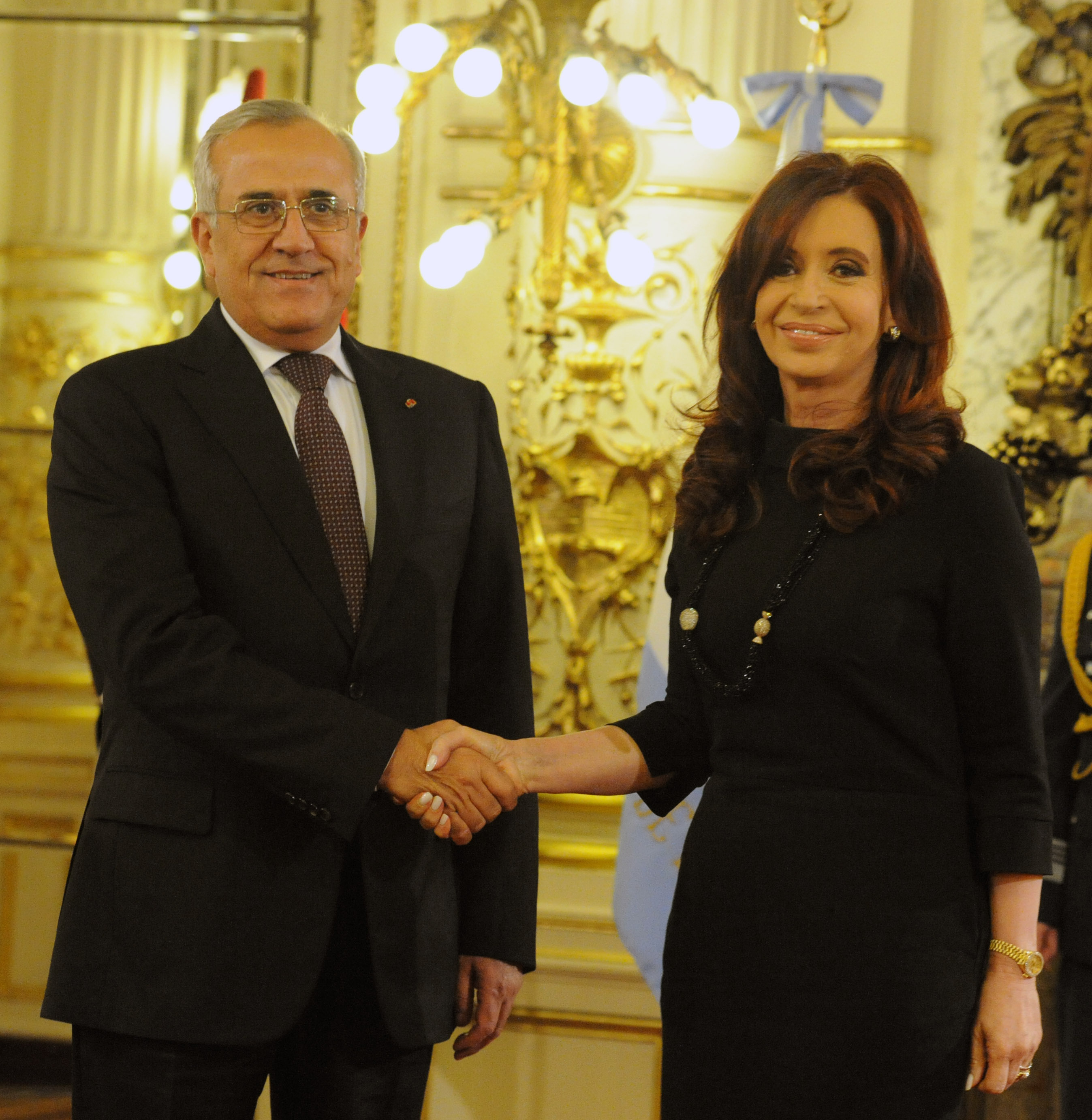
Prominent Lebanese people and people of Lebanese descent.

Apart from the four and a half million citizens of Lebanon proper, there is a sizeable Lebanese diaspora. There are more Lebanese people living outside of Lebanon (over 4 million), than within (4.6 million citizens plus 1.5 million refugees). The majority of the diaspora population consists of Lebanese Christians; however, there are some who are Muslim. They trace their origin to several waves of Christian emigration, starting with the exodus that followed the 1860 Lebanon conflict in Ottoman Syria.

Under the current Lebanese nationality law, diaspora Lebanese do not have an automatic right of return to Lebanon. Due to varying degrees of assimilation and high degree of interethnic marriages, most diaspora Lebanese have not passed on the Arabic language to their children, while still maintaining a Lebanese ethnic identity.

Many Lebanese families are economically and politically prominent in several Latin American countries (in 2007 Mexican Carlos Slim Helú, son of Lebanese immigrants, was determined to be the wealthiest man in the World by Fortune Magazine), and make up a substantial portion of the Lebanese American community in the United States. The largest Lebanese diaspora is located in Brazil, where about 6–7 million people have Lebanese descent (see Lebanese Brazilian). In Argentina, there is also a large Lebanese diaspora of approximately 1.5 million people having Lebanese descent. (see Lebanese Argentine). In Canada, there is also a large Lebanese diaspora of approximately 250,000-500,000 people having Lebanese descent. (see Lebanese Canadians).

There are also sizable populations in West Africa, particularly Ivory Coast, Sierra Leone and Senegal.

While under Syrian occupation, Beirut passed legislation which prevented second-generation Lebanese of the diaspora from automatically obtaining Lebanese citizenship. This has reinforced the émigré status of many diaspora Lebanese. There is currently a campaign by those Lebanese of the diaspora who already have Lebanese citizenship to attain the vote from abroad, which has been successfully passed in the Lebanese parliament and will be effective as of 2013 which is the next parliamentary elections. If suffrage was to be extended to these 1.2 million Lebanese émigré citizens, it would have a significant political effect, since as many as 82% of them are believed to be Christian.

=== Lebanese Civil War refugees and displaced persons ===
With no official figures available, it is estimated that 600,000–900,000 persons fled the country during the Lebanese Civil War (1975–90). Although some have since returned, this permanently disturbed Lebanese population growth and greatly complicated demographic statistics.

Another result of the war was a large number of internally displaced persons. This especially affected the southern Shia community, as Israeli invasion of southern Lebanon in 1978, 1982, and 1996 prompted waves of mass emigration, in addition to the continual strain of occupation and fighting between Israel and Hezbollah (mainly 1982 to 2000).

Many Shias from Southern Lebanon resettled in the suburbs south of Beirut. After the war, the pace of Christian emigration accelerated, as many Christians felt discriminated against in a Lebanon under increasingly oppressive Syrian occupation.

According to a UNDP study, as much as 10% of the Lebanese had a disability in 1990. Other studies have pointed to the fact that this portion of society is highly marginalized due to the lack of educational and governmental support of their advancement.

== Languages ==
Modern Standard Arabic is the official language of the country, but the Lebanese dialect of Levantine Arabic is used in conversations. French and English are taught in many schools from a young age. Among the Armenian ethnic minority in Lebanon, the Armenian language is taught and spoken.

== CIA World Factbook demographic statistics ==
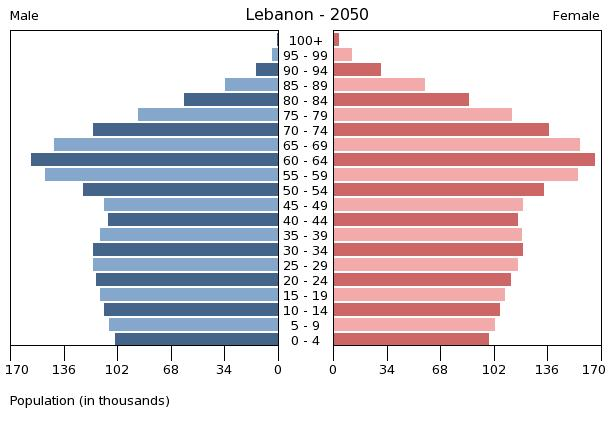
US Census Statistics

Population, fertility rate and net reproduction rate, United Nations estimates

The following demographic statistics are from the CIA World Factbook, unless otherwise indicated.

- Population:

Total population: 6,100,075 (July 2018 est.)
Lebanese nationals: 4,680,212 (July 2018 est.)
Syrian refugees: 944,613 (April 2019 est.) registered at the UNHCR (down from 1,077,000 in June 2014)
Palestinian refugees: 175,555 (2018 est.)
Iraqi refugees: 5,695 (2017 est.)

Age structure:

- 0–14 years: 23.32% (male 728,025/female 694,453) 15–24 years: 16.04% (male 500,592/female 477,784) 25–54 years: 45.27% (male 1,398,087/female 1,363,386) 55–64 years: 8.34% (male 241,206/female 267,747) 65 years and over: 7.03% (male 185,780/female 243,015) (2018 est.)
- Median age:

Total: 31.3 years
Male: 30.7 years
Female: 31.9 years (2018 est.)

- Population growth rate:

1.04% (2005 est.)
0.96% (2011 est.)
−3.13% (2018 est.)

- Net migration rate:

−4.43 migrant(s)/1,000 population (2011 est.)
−40.3 migrant(s)/1,000 population (2018 est.)

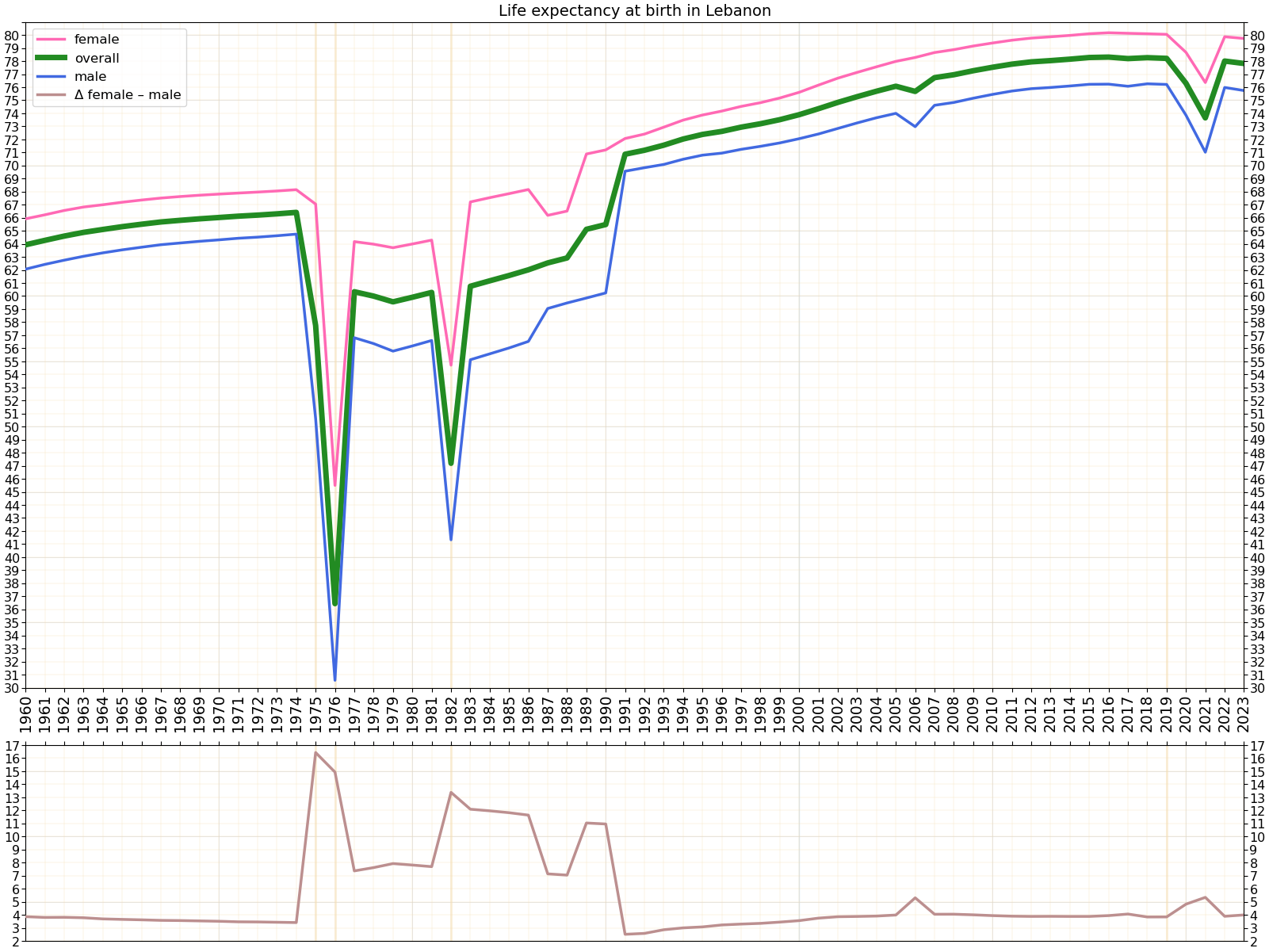
Life expectancy at birth in Lebanon

- Sex ratio:

at birth: 1.05 male(s)/female
under 15 years: 1.04 male(s)/female
15–64 years: 0.92 male(s)/female
65 years and over: 0.83 male(s)/female
total population: 0.94 male(s)/female (2005 est.)

- Life expectancy at birth:

total population: 77.9 years
male: 76.6 years
female: 79.3 years (2018 est.)

== Vital statistics ==
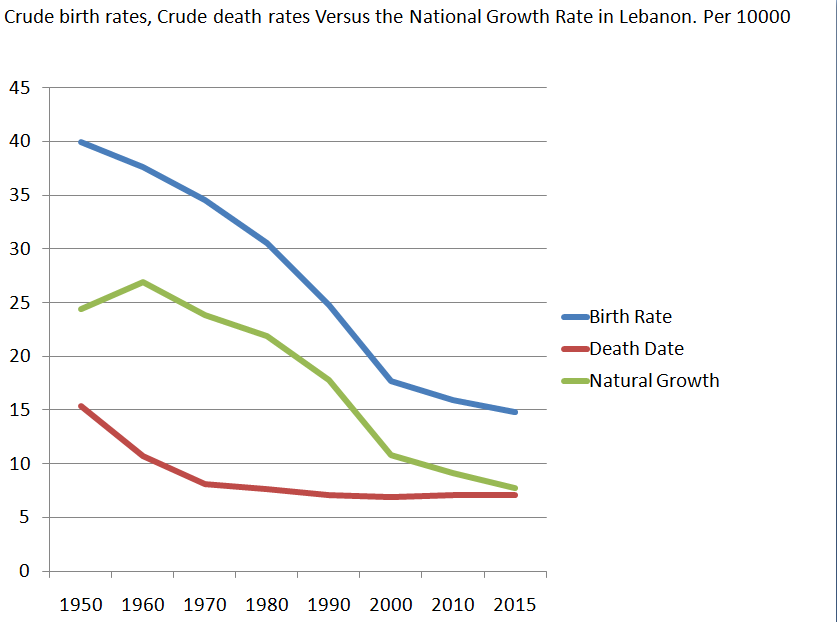
Natural Growth Rate in Lebanon throughout years

Notable events in demography of Lebanon:

- 1975-1990 – Lebanese Civil War
- 1982 Lebanon War
- 2006 Lebanon War
- 2011-2024 – Syrian revolution

=== UN estimates ===
The website Our World in Data prepared the following estimates based on statistics from the Population Department of the United Nations.

	Mid-year population	Live births	Deaths	Natural change	Crude birth rate (per 1000)	Crude death rate (per 1000)	Natural change (per 1000)	Crude migration rate (per 1000)	Total fertility rate (TFR)	Infant mortality (per 1000 live births)	Life expectancy (in years)
1950	1,350,000	55,000	17,000	38,000	40.8	12.6	28.2		5.81	75.0	61.04
1951	1,388,000	57,000	17,000	39,000	40.8	12.6	28.2	-0.7	5.80	73.8	61.37
1952	1,428,000	58,000	18,000	41,000	40.7	12.3	28.4	-0.7	5.80	71.4	61.73
1953	1,469,000	60,000	18,000	42,000	40.6	12.0	28.6	-0.7	5.80	69.1	62.23
1954	1,512,000	61,000	18,000	44,000	40.5	11.7	28.8	-0.7	5.81	67.1	62.65
1955	1,556,000	63,000	18,000	45,000	40.3	11.7	28.6	-0.6	5.81	67.4	62.42
1956	1,602,000	64,000	18,000	46,000	40.1	11.0	29.0	0	5.81	63.2	63.38
1957	1,649,000	66,000	18,000	48,000	39.8	10.7	29.2	-0.6	5.81	61.4	63.90
1958	1,697,000	67,000	19,000	48,000	39.5	11.3	28.2	0	5.81	59.8	62.08
1959	1,747,000	69,000	18,000	51,000	39.2	10.1	29.2	-0.6	5.82	58.2	64.61
1960	1,798,000	70,000	18,000	52,000	38.8	9.8	29.0	-0.6	5.82	56.7	64.84
1961	1,853,000	71,000	18,000	53,000	38.3	9.5	28.8	1.1	5.81	55.4	65.29
1962	1,912,000	72,000	18,000	55,000	37.9	9.3	28.5	2,1	5.80	54.3	65.40
1963	1,972,000	74,000	18,000	56,000	37.4	9.1	28.3	2.0	5.78	53.0	65.67
1964	2,030,000	74,000	18,000	57,000	36.7	8.8	27.8	0.5	5.72	51.9	65.95
1965	2,087,000	75,000	18,000	57,000	35.9	8.6	27.3	0	5.65	50.9	66.07
1966	2,146,000	76,000	18,000	57,000	35.2	8.5	26.8	0.9	5.57	50.0	66.16
1967	2,203,000	76,000	18,000	58,000	34.7	8.2	26.4	-0.5	5.49	49.2	66.52
1968	2,262,000	77,000	18,000	59,000	34.1	8.1	26.0	0	5.38	48.6	66.61
1969	2,324,000	78,000	19,000	60,000	33.7	8.0	25.7	0.9	5.28	48.0	66.70
1970	2,382,000	79,000	19,000	61,000	33.3	7.9	25.5	-1.3	5.17	47.5	66.76
1971	2,442,000	80,000	19,000	61,000	33.0	7.8	25.2	-0.4	5.04	47.0	66.82
1972	2,506,000	82,000	19,000	63,000	32.8	7.7	25.1	0.4	4.93	46.5	66.91
1973	2,570,000	83,000	19,000	64,000	32.4	7.5	25.0	0	4.81	45.9	67.23
1974	2,633,000	85,000	20,000	65,000	32.2	7.4	24.8	-0.8	4.69	45.3	67.29
1975	2,692,000	86,000	30,000	56,000	31.9	11.1	20.8	1.1	4.56	45.2	58.13
1976	3,070,000	87,000	85,000	2,000	31.8	31.2	0.6	122.5	4.42	102.9	33.74
1977	3,458,000	110,000	37,000	73,000	31.7	10.7	21.0	91.1	4.31	52.8	59.28
1978	3,183,000	111,000	37,000	74,000	31.5	10.6	20.9	-109.6	4.20	51.7	59.38
1979	2,902,000	91,000	31,000	61,000	31.4	10.5	20.9	-117.8	4.09	50.6	59.47
1980	2,964,000	93,000	31,000	62,000	31.4	10.4	21.0	0	4.03	49.4	59.67
1981	3,027,000	95,000	31,000	64,000	31.5	10.2	21.3	-0.3	3.98	48.2g	59.92
1982	3,070,000	96,000	60,000	36,000	31.2	19.4	11.8	2.3	3.89	70.1	45.13
1983	3,107,000	96,000	31,000	65,000	30.8	9.9	20.9	-9.0	3.79	39.9	59.96
1984	3,164,000	96,000	31,000	65,000	30.4	9.8	20.7	-2.5	3.70	38.6	60.30
1985	3,227,000	96,000	31,000	65,000	29.8	9.7	20.1	-0.6	3.59	37.4	60.49
1986	3,308,000	96,000	31,000	65,000	29.3	9.4	19.8	4.8	3.50	35.8	60.97
1987	3,391,000	98,000	31,000	66,000	28.8	9.3	19.6	5.0	3.43	40.1	61.43
1988	3,457,000	99,000	32,000	68,000	28.7	9.1	19.5	-0.6	3.40	38.7	61.72
1989	3,526,000	101,000	28,000	73,000	28.6	8.0	20.7	-1,1	3.39	27.8	64.16
1990	3,594,000	100,000	28,000	72,000	27.8	7.8	20.0	-1.1	3.30	26.7	64.48
1991	3,667,000	99,000	19,000	80,000	26.9	5.2	21.7	-1.9	3.19	25.7	71.18
1992	3,745,000	97,000	20,000	78,000	25.9	5.2	20.7	0	3.08	24.8	71.19
1993	3,819,000	95,000	20,000	75,000	24.9	5.2	19.7	-0.3	2.97	23.7	71.38
1994	3,888,000	93,000	20,000	73,000	23.9	5.1	18.9	-1.0	2.87	22.5	71.68
1995	3,960,000	92,000	20,000	72,000	23.1	5.0	18.2	0	2.78	21.5	72.04
1996	4,034,000	91,000	20,000	72,000	22.7	4.9	17.7	0.5	2.74	20.6	72.29
1997	4,108,000	90,000	20,000	71,000	22.0	4.8	17.2	0.7	2.66	19.6	72.78
1998	4,179,000	90,000	20,000	70,000	21.4	4.8	16.6	0.2	2.60	18.7	72.94
1999	4,250,000	89,000	20,000	69,000	21.0	4.6	16.3	0.5	2.55	17.9	73.49
2000	4,321,000	89,000	20,000	69,000	20.5	4.6	15.9	0.5	2.50	17.0	73.93
2001	4,389,000	89,000	20,000	69,000	20.2	4.5	15.7	-0.2	2.46	15.9	74.37
2002	4,447,000	88,000	19,000	69,000	19.7	4.3	15.4	-2.5	2.41	14.9	75.06
2003	4,505,000	86,000	19,000	67,000	19.2	4.2	15.0	-2.0	2.35	13.9	75.59
2004	4,575,000	85,000	19,000	66,000	18.6	4.2	14.4	0.9	2.27	13.0	75.98
2005	4,643,000	84,000	19,000	64,000	18.0	4.2	13.9	0.9	2.20	12.0	76.27
2006	4,720,000	83,000	20,000	63,000	17.7	4.3	13.4	3.0	2.16	11.2	76.08
2007	4,810,000	83,000	20,000	64,000	17.3	4.1	13.2	5.4	2.11	10.4	77.08
2008	4,888,000	84,000	20,000	64,000	17.1	14.0	13.1	2.9	2.08	9.7	77.58
2009	4,951,000	85,000	20,000	65,000	17.2	4.0	13.2	-0.4	2.09	9.2	77.89
2010	4,996,000	88,000	20,000	68,000	17.6	4.1	13.5	-4.6	2.13	8.7	78.16
2011	5,045,000	90,000	21,000	69,000	17.9	4.1	13.8	-4.0	2.16	8.4	78.40
2012	5,178,000	92,000	21,000	70,000	17.9	4.1	13.8	12.2	2.17	8.0	78.63
2013	5,679,000	95,000	22,000	73,000	17.9	4.2	13.7	75.4	2.17	7.8	78.77
2014	6,274,000	110,000	26,000	84,000	17.9	4.2	13.7	81.4	2.18	7.5	78.97
2015	6,399,000	116,000	28,000	88,000	17.8	4.2	13.5	5.8	2.18	7.2	79.23
2016	6,259,000	111,000	28,000	83,000	17.4	4.3	13.1	-35.6	2.18	6.8	79.51
2017	6,109,000	105,000	28,000	77,000	16.9	4.5	12.4	-37.2	2.17	6.6	79.65
2018	5,951,000	99,000	29,000	70,000	16.3	4.7	11.6	-38.3	2.15	6.4	79.73
2019	5,782,000	93,000	31,000	63,000	15.8	5.2	10.6	-40.1	2.13	6.2	79.24
2020	5,663,000	88,000	36,000	52,000	15.3	6.3	9.1	-30.2	2.10	6.0	77.80
2021	5,593,000	84,000	47,000	38,000	14.9	8.3	6.7	-19.3	2.09	5.8	75.05

==== TFR before 1950 ====
Years	1925	1926	1927	1928	1929	1930	1931	1932	1933	1934
Total Fertility Rate in Lebanon	5.74	5.74	5.74	5.74	5.74	5.74	5.74	5.75	5.75	5.75

Years	1935	1936	1937	1938	1939	1940	1941	1942	1943	1944
Total Fertility Rate in Lebanon	5.75	5.75	5.75	5.75	5.75	5.75	5.75	5.75	5.75	5.76

Years	1945	1946	1947	1948	1949
Total Fertility Rate in Lebanon	5.76	5.76	5.76	5.76	5.76

=== Registered births and deaths ===
	Average population	Live births	Deaths	Natural change	Crude birth rate (per 1000)	Crude death rate (per 1000)	Natural change (per 1000)	Crude migration rate (per 1000)	Total fertility rate (TFR)
1990		70,903	13,263	57,640					
1991		82,742	15,773	66,969					
1992		94,607	18,042	76,565					
1993		90,947	24,223	66,724					
1994		90,712	18,421	72,291					
1995		91,196	19,230	71,966					
1996		86,997	19,962	67,035					
1997		85,018	19,884	65,134					
1998		84,250	20,097	64,153					
1999		85,955	19,813	66,142					
2000		87,795	19,435	68,360					
2001		83,693	17,568	66,125					
2002		76,405	17,294	59,111					
2003		71,702	17,187	54,515					
2004	3,755,000	73,900	17,774	56,126					1.75
2005	3,811,000	73,973	18,012	55,961					
2006	3,867,000	72,790	18,787	54,003					
2007	3,759,137	80,896	21,092	59,804	21.5	5.6	15.9		
2008	3,824,000	84,823	21,048	63,775	22.3	5.5	16.8		
2009	3,891,000	90,388	22,260	68,128	23.4	5.8	17.6		
2010	3,962,000	91,795	21,441	70,354	23.2	5.4	17.8		
2011	4,036,000	97,877	23,257	74,630	25.4	6.0	19.6	0.91	
2012	4,104,000	90,167	22,792	67,375	23.3	5.8	17.5	0.15	
2013	4,168,000	86,950	23,414	65,536	23.2	6.1	17.1	−0.38	
2014	4,231,000	88,704	25,117	63,587	23.0	6.5	16.5	−0.13	
2015	4,292,000	85,453	25,275	60,178	22.3	6.6	15.7	−0.42	2.07
2016	4,356,000	88,996	24,617	64,379	23.1	6.4	16.7	−0.07	2.15
2017	4,421,000	90,647	25,847	64,800	23.5	6.7	16.9	0.04	2.32
2018	3,864,000	89,772	25,096	64,676	23.2	6.5	16.7	−161.52	2.35
2019	3,910,000	86,179	24,950	61,229	22.0	6.4	15.6	−3.94	2.13
2020	3,944,000	74,049	28,637	45,412	18.9	6.8	12.1	−2.88	1.95
2021	3,966,000	68,130	34,725	33,405	17.2	8.8	8.4	−2.88	1.77
2022	3,989,000	62,868	29,455	33,413	15.8	7.4	8.4	−2.61	1.80
2023	3,989,000	66,866	26,284	40,582	16.8	6.6	10.2	−10.17	1.76
2024	4,044,000	65,209	26,715	38,494	16.1	6.6	9.5	4.08	1.71
2025	4,070,000	70,986	33,952	37,034	17.4	8.3	9.1		1.51

View source data.
View source data.
View source data.
View source data.

== Immigrants and ethnic groups ==
There are substantial numbers of immigrants from other Arab countries (mainly Palestine, Syria, Iraq) and non-Arab-speaking Muslim countries. Also, recent years have seen an influx of people from Ethiopia and South East Asian countries such as Indonesia, the Philippines, Malaysia, Sri Lanka, as well as smaller numbers of other immigrant minorities, including Colombians and Brazilians (many of Lebanese descent themselves). Most of these are employed as guest workers in the same fashion as Syrians and Palestinians, and entered the country to search for employment in the post-war reconstruction of Lebanon. Apart from the Palestinians, there are approximately 180,000 stateless persons in Lebanon.

=== Armenians ===
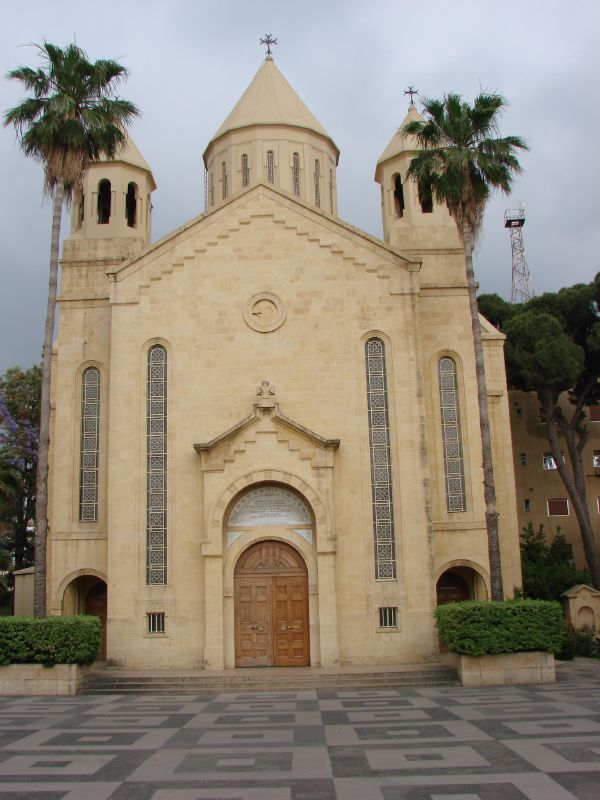
Armenian Church in north Beirut

Armenians have lived in Lebanon for centuries. According to Minority Rights Group International, there are 156,000 Armenians in Lebanon, around 4% of the population. Prior to the Lebanese Civil War, the number was higher, but the community lost a portion of its population to emigration.

=== French and Italians ===
During the French Mandate of Lebanon, there was a fairly large French minority and a tiny Italian minority. Most of the French and Italian settlers left after Lebanese independence in 1943 and only 22,000 French Lebanese and 4,300 Italian Lebanese continue to live in Lebanon. The most important legacy of the French Mandate is the frequent use and knowledge of the French language by most of the educated Lebanese people, and Beirut is still known as the "Paris of the Middle East".

=== Palestinians ===
Around 175,555 Palestinian refugees were registered in Lebanon with the UNRWA in 2014, who are refugees or descendants of refugees from the 1948 Arab–Israeli War. Some 53% live in 12 Palestine refugee camps, who "suffer from serious problems" such as poverty and overcrowding. Some of these may have emigrated during the civil war, but there are no reliable figures available. There are also a number of Palestinians who are not registered as UNRWA refugees, because they left earlier than 1948 or were not in need of material assistance. The exact number of Palestinians remain a subject of great dispute and the Lebanese government will not provide an estimate. A figure of 400,000 Palestinian refugees would mean that Palestinians constitute less than 7% of the resident population of Lebanon.

Palestinians living in Lebanon are considered foreigners and are under the same restrictions on employment applied to other foreigners. Prior to 2010, they were under even more restrictive employment rules which permitted, other than work for the U.N., only the most menial employment. Palestinian refugees, who constitute nearly 6.6% of the country's population, have long been denied basic rights in Lebanon. They are not allowed to attend public schools, own property or pass on inheritances, measures Lebanon says it has adopted to preserve their right to return to their property in what constitutes Israel now.

Their presence is controversial, and resisted by large segments of the Christian population, who argue that the primarily Sunni Muslim Palestinians dilute Christian numbers. Many Shia Muslims also look unfavorably upon the Palestinian presence since the refugee camps have tended to be concentrated in their home areas. The Lebanese Sunnis, however, would be happy to see these Palestinians given the Lebanese nationality, thus increasing the Lebanese Sunni population by well over 10% and tipping the fragile electoral balance much in favor of the Sunnis. Late prime minister Rafiq Hariri —himself a Sunni— had hinted on more than one occasion on the inevitability of granting these refugees Lebanese citizenship. Thus far the refugees lack Lebanese citizenship as well as many rights enjoyed by the rest of the population, and are confined to severely overcrowded refugee camps, in which construction rights are severely constricted.

Palestinians may not work in a large number of professions, such as lawyers and doctors. However, after negotiations between Lebanese authorities and ministers from the Palestinian National Authority some professions for Palestinians were allowed (such as taxi driver and construction worker). The material situation of the Palestinian refugees in Lebanon is difficult, and they are believed to constitute the poorest community in Lebanon, as well as the poorest Palestinian community with the possible exception of Gaza Strip refugees. Their primary sources of income are UNRWA aid and menial labor sought in competition with Syrian guest workers.

The Palestinians are majority Sunni Muslims with a Christian minority, though at some point Christians counted as high as 40% with Muslims at 60%. The numbers of Palestinian Christians has diminished in later years, as many have managed to leave Lebanon.

60,000 Palestinians have received Lebanese citizenship.

=== Syrians ===
In 1976, the then Syrian president Hafez al-Assad sent troops into Lebanon to fight PLO forces on behalf of Christian militias. This led to escalated fighting until a cease-fire agreement later that year that allowed for the stationing of Syrian troops within Lebanon. The Syrian presence in Lebanon quickly changed sides; soon after they entered Lebanon they had flip-flopped and began to fight the Christian nationalists in Lebanon they allegedly entered the country to protect. The Kateab Party and the Lebanese Forces under Bachir Gemayel strongly resisted the Syrians in Lebanon. In 1989, 40,000 Syrian troops remained in central and eastern Lebanon under the supervision of the Syrian government. Although, the Taif Accord, established in the same year, called for the removal of Syrian troops and transfer of arms to the Lebanese army, the Syrian Army remained in Lebanon until the Lebanese Cedar Revolution in 2005 ended the Syrian occupation of Lebanon.

In 1994, the Lebanese government under the pressure of the Syrian government, gave Lebanese passports to thousands of Syrians.

After the start of the Syrian Civil War in 2011, Syrians began to flee the country, with many arriving in Lebanon. As of 2013, there were nearly 1.08 million registered Syrian refugees in Lebanon but is estimated that the figure is closer 1.5 million.

=== Assyrians ===
There are an estimated 40,000 to 80,000 Iraqi Assyrian refugees in Lebanon. The vast majority of them are undocumented, with a large number having been deported or put in prison. They belong to various denominations, including the Assyrian Church of the East, Chaldean Catholic Church, and Syriac Catholic Church.

=== Iraqis ===
Due to the US-led invasion of Iraq, Lebanon received a mass influx of Iraqi refugees numbering at around 100,000. The vast majority of them are undocumented, with a large number having been deported or put in prison.

=== Kurds ===
There are an estimated 80,000 to 120,000 Kurdish refugees from Turkey and Syria within Lebanese territory. Many of them are undocumented. As of 2012, around 40% of all Kurds in Lebanon do not have Lebanese citizenship.

=== Turks ===
The Turkish people began to migrate to Lebanon once the Ottoman sultan Selim I conquered the region in 1516. Turks were encouraged to stay in Lebanon by being rewarded with land and money. Today the Turkish minority numbers approximately 80,000. Moreover, since the Syrian Civil War, approximately 125,000 to 150,000 Syrian Turkmen refugees arrived in Lebanon, and hence they now outnumber the long established Turkish minority who settled since the Ottoman era.

=== Circassians ===
The Circassians migrated to the Ottoman Empire including Lebanon and neighboring countries in the 18th and 19th century. However, they are mostly located in Akkar Governorate, in which they have come to Berkail since 1754. Today the Circassian minority numbers approximately 100,000.

== See also ==
- Demographics of the Middle East
- Migrant domestic workers in Lebanon
