= Family law in Lebanon =

Lebanon operates under a sectarian political system in which legally recognized religious communities are granted institutional autonomy in certain domains, including personal status law. As a result, marriage, divorce, inheritance, and child custody are governed by separate religious legal systems administered by sectarian courts.

The Lebanese Constitution grants 18 recognized religious communities in Lebanon (12 Christian, 4 Muslim, 1 Druze, and 1 Jewish) legal autonomy in regulating their communal rights, including their family law. Moreover, each religious sector submitted its own personal-status codes pertaining to the family legal system all of which conform to the Lebanese constitution, civil laws, and rules and regulations which ensure law and order. Specifically, the Sunni and Jaʿfari personal-status codes were based on the Ottoman Family Law of 1917, along with their own schools of thought.

The sectarian system gives each religious sector its own family law and religious courts which apply to marriage, divorce, inheritance, and custody. Furthermore, individuals must marry according to their religious sect, civil marriages are invalid in Lebanon.

Although family law in Lebanon is organised along sectarian lines, scholars emphasise that individuals often navigate these legal systems strategically. Court cases demonstrate that different legal identities or interpretations of religious law are invoked in order to pursue particular outcomes in matters such as divorce, custody, and inheritance. This highlights that sectarian legal categories are not always rigid but are negotiated through everyday legal practices.

== History ==
=== The Ottoman Law of Family Rights (1917) ===
The Ottoman Law of Family Rights (1917), also known as the Hukuk-i Aile Kararnamesi, codified and attempted to modernize Ottoman family law. The significance of the code remains heavily debated, with scholars arguing whether it was a major achievement of Islamic law or a reform that fell short.

Prior to the implementation of the Ottoman Law of Family Rights (1917), family matters in the empire were not centrally regulated. As a religiously and culturally diverse state, marriage traditions were governed by the holy texts of each religious community. Any attempt to alter this system risked confrontation with Muslim, Christian, and Jewish religious authorities. However, under the new law, religious communities — which had previously enjoyed autonomy in family matters — were now required to adhere to state-promulgated laws, follow standardized administrative procedures, and submit to a bureaucratic recording system. This shift reflected the empire's broader effort to centralize power by subjecting all citizens, regardless of religion, to Islamic law. These reforms were part of the Tanzimat period (1839–1876), during which Ottoman elites, alarmed by Europe's rising power, sought to modernize the empire. The process intensified with the Tanzimat Charter of 1856, which aimed to align Ottoman institutions with European social, political, and economic norms.

=== Repeal and legacy ===
The Hukuk-i Aile Kararnamesi was short-lived (1917–1919), repealed under pressure from Allied powers amid protests by non-Muslim communities and conservative Muslims. The latter opposed the reduced role of shari’a courts, particularly the transfer of authority over marriage contracts from religious to state institutions. Although the decree was repealed after just two years, it continues to influence certain Islamic states, notably Lebanon.

=== Post-WWI context ===
Following World War I, the Ottoman Empire was dissolved, and its Arab territories — including Iraq, Jordan, Lebanon, and British Mandate Palestine — were partitioned between Great Britain and France. Lebanon, under the French Mandate (1920–1943), institutionalised a system of sectarian governance in which recognised religious communities retained authority over personal status matters such as marriage, divorce, and inheritance. This system expanded earlier Ottoman arrangements and linked religious courts more directly to the emerging Lebanese state. As a result, family law became a central mechanism through which sectarian identities were legally defined and incorporated into the political system.

== 1926 Swiss Civil Code ==
After the empire's collapse, the newly established Turkish Republic abolished the OLFR in 1926, replacing it with a secular civil code modeled on Switzerland's. This marked a radical departure from Islamic legal traditions. After gaining independence in the 1950s, several states used the OLFR as a basis for their family codes.

== Marriage ==
The main Muslim sects in Lebanon are the Sunnis and Jaʿfari Shia and represent the Muslim population in Lebanon. The Sunni and Jaʿfari Shia personal status law were issued on 4 November 1942 and later modified in 1946 and 1962.

The two sectors use the 1917 Ottoman Law of Family Rights as one of the bases to issue judgements. Rulings of the Sunni sector are also issued by No.46 entitled "Family Judgements" and from Hanafi jurisprudence (fiqh). While Shia rulings are based on Jaʿfari fiqh, legal opinions issued by scholarly authorities (fatwas), and although it is not binding the Guide to Jaʿfari Justice (1944).

== Role of the Plenary Assembly at the Court of Cassation ==
The Plenary Assembly at the Court of Cassation, which sits in Beirut, is Lebanon's highest court. Cases may be appealed to this court, whose decision is final. This includes cases from personal status courts, if they include large breaches of established law that have implications for public order. It can also offer jurisprudence when there is conflict between a judiciary and personal status court, or between two personal status courts.
