= Berkail =

Berkail برقايل
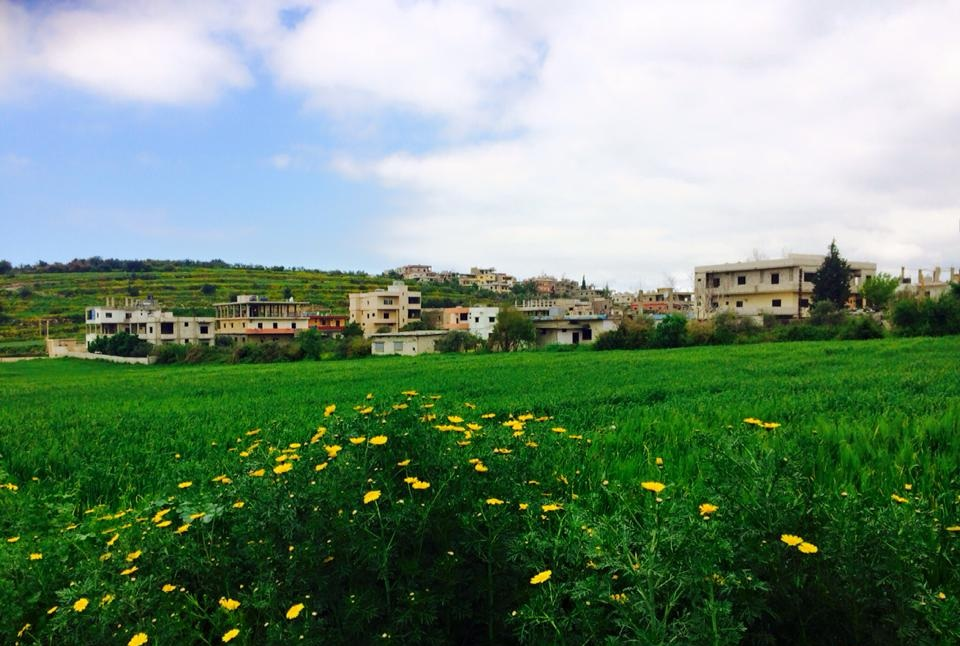
- Berkail, 2015

- Location in Lebanon
- Coordinates: 34°28′39″N 36°02′02″E
- Country: Lebanon
- Governorate: Akkar
- District: Akkar
- Time zone: UTC+2 (EET)
  - Summer (DST): +3

Berqayel or Berkayel (Arabic: برقايل) is one of the largest and the most historical towns in Akkar Governorate in northern Lebanon. Berkail is about 25 km north Tripoli. Berkail is well known by its olive production and green fields. It is a Sunni Muslim community.

== History ==
In 1838, Eli Smith noted the village, whose inhabitants were Sunni Muslim, located west of esh-Sheikh Mohammed.

== Economy ==
Much of Berkail's population is employed by the Lebanese Army. Olives are the main agricultural product.

== Bibliography ==
- Robinson, E.; Smith, E. (1841). Biblical Researches in Palestine, Mount Sinai and Arabia Petraea: A Journal of Travels in the year 1838. Vol. 3. Boston: Crocker & Brewster.
