= Palestinian identity card =

National identity card of Palestine

Palestinian identity card بطاقة الهوية الفلسطينية
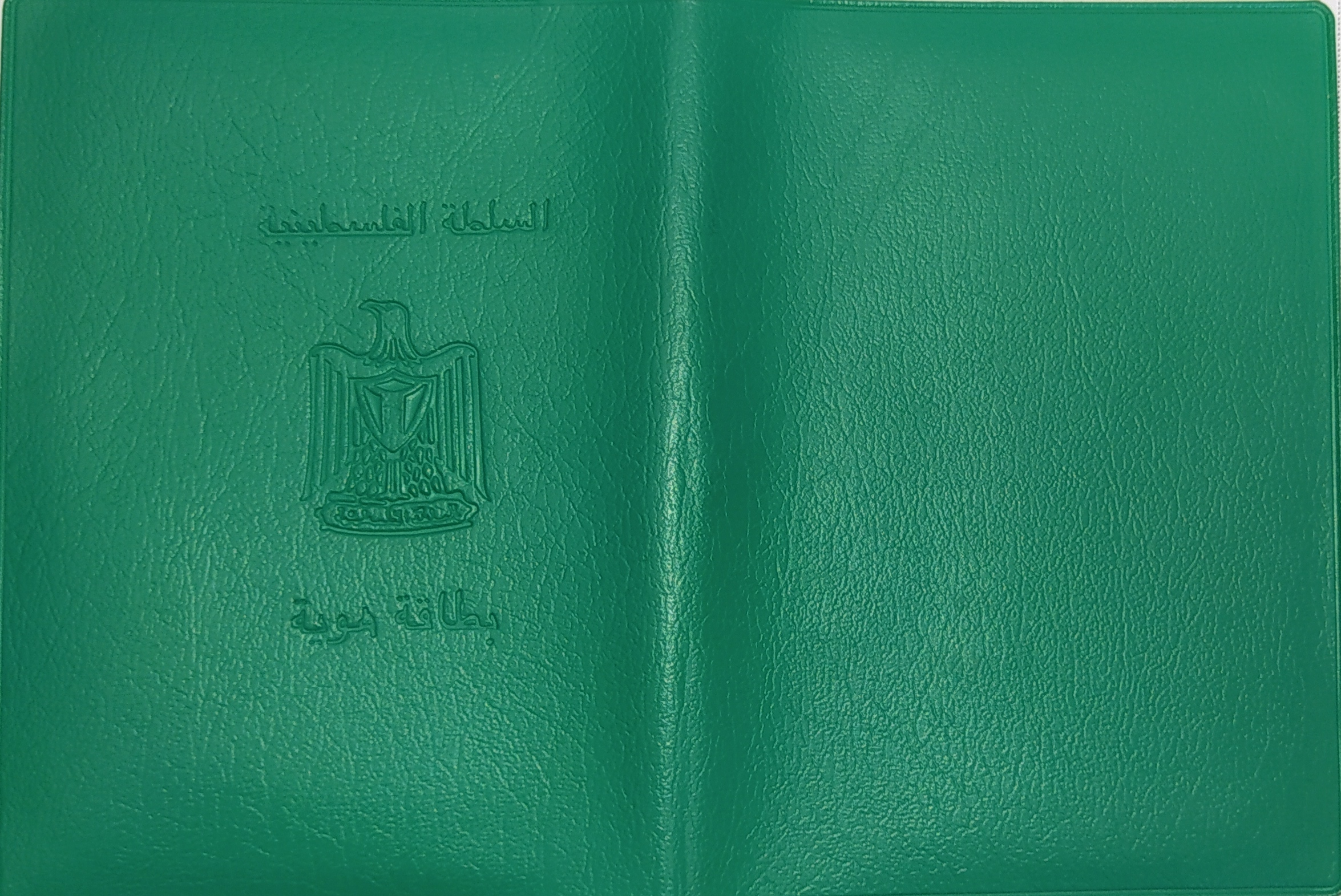
- Plastic cover of the Palestinian identity card

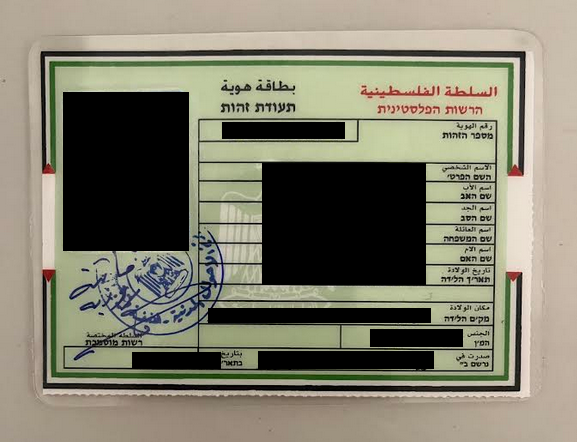
- Palestinian identity card (removed from case)
- Type: National identity card
- Issued by: Ministry of Interior
- First issued: 1994
- Purpose: Identification
- Eligibility: Must be registered in the Palestinian population registry before the age of 16
- Expiration: Issued without a fixed expiration date and is valid for life unless replaced
- Cost: د.أ 2 (first issuance); fees may vary depending on where the application is submitted; renewal typically costs ₪50–₪60

The Palestinian identity card (Arabic: بطاقة الهوية الفلسطينية, Biṭāqat al-Huwīyah al-Filasṭīnīyah) is an identity document issued by the Palestinian Authority to Palestinian citizens of Palestine. It is defined in Article (2) of the Palestinian Civil Status Law of 1999 as a "legal document for identifying its holder", issued by the Civil Status Directorate of the Palestinian Ministry of Interior. Under Palestinian law, individuals registered in the population registry are required to obtain an identity card upon reaching the age of 16.

Unlike traditional citizenships, obtaining a Palestinian identity card (hawwiya) depends on being registered in the Israeli-controlled Palestinian population registry rather than simply on descent. In practice, a person must be physically present in the State of Palestine before passing the age of 16 and be added to a parent's identity card before receiving their own. Because of these requirements, many Palestinians in the diaspora who were never registered or were unable to visit Palestine and therefore cannot receive a Palestinian passport.

== History ==
The modern Palestinian identity card system developed after the 1967 Arab-Israeli war and is distinct from earlier identification documents issued during the period of Mandatory Palestine (1920–1948). During the Mandate period, the British administration issued various forms of identity papers and travel documents to residents of Palestine.

Following the end of the British Mandate and the outbreak of the 1948 Arab–Israeli War after the establishment of Israel in 1948, Jordanian forces occupied the area during the war, In 1950 Jordan annexed the territory that became known as the West Bank. During this period, West Bank residents were incorporated into Jordan's administrative and civil documentation systems, including identification documents issued by the Jordanian government. This arrangement continued until 1967.

During the same period, the Gaza Strip came under the administration of Egypt following the 1948 war. In 1958, Egypt entered into a political union with Syria known as the United Arab Republic. While Gaza remained under Egyptian administration during this period, it was formally administered in connection with Egypt as part of the United Arab Republic until the union with Syria ended in 1961. Egypt continued to administer Gaza until 1967.

Following the 1967 war, Israel captured the West Bank and East Jerusalem from Jordan and the Gaza Strip from Egypt and created a population registry for residents of the Palestinian territories. A population census was then conducted, and individual present then were registered in the Israeli-controlled population registry and assigned unique identification numbers. These numbers later formed the basis of the modern Palestinian identification system.

Until the Oslo Accords, Palestinian identity cards were issued by the Israeli Military Government following the 1967 war, and later by the Israeli Civil Administration. The plastic cover of the ID carried the emblem of the Israeli army. Card colors differed by region:

- West Bank residents – orange cover
- East Jerusalem residents – blue cover
- Gaza Strip residents - (unknown)

Then, after the establishment of the Palestinian Authority, as a result of the Oslo Accords, the responsibility for issuing ID cards to residents of the West Bank and Gaza Strip was consequently transferred to the Palestinian Ministry of Interior, subject to Israeli approval. Under the agreements, Israel transferred the authority over the Palestinian population registry and address data to the Palestinian side.

In 1996, Israel reinstated the requirement of prior approval for changing a resident's registered address from Gaza to the West Bank.

In 2000, Israel announced it would not recognize any registry changes made without its approval. Israel also determines the national ID numbers of Palestinians. Palestinians holding Gaza IDs but residing in the West Bank are considered by Israel to be "illegally present".

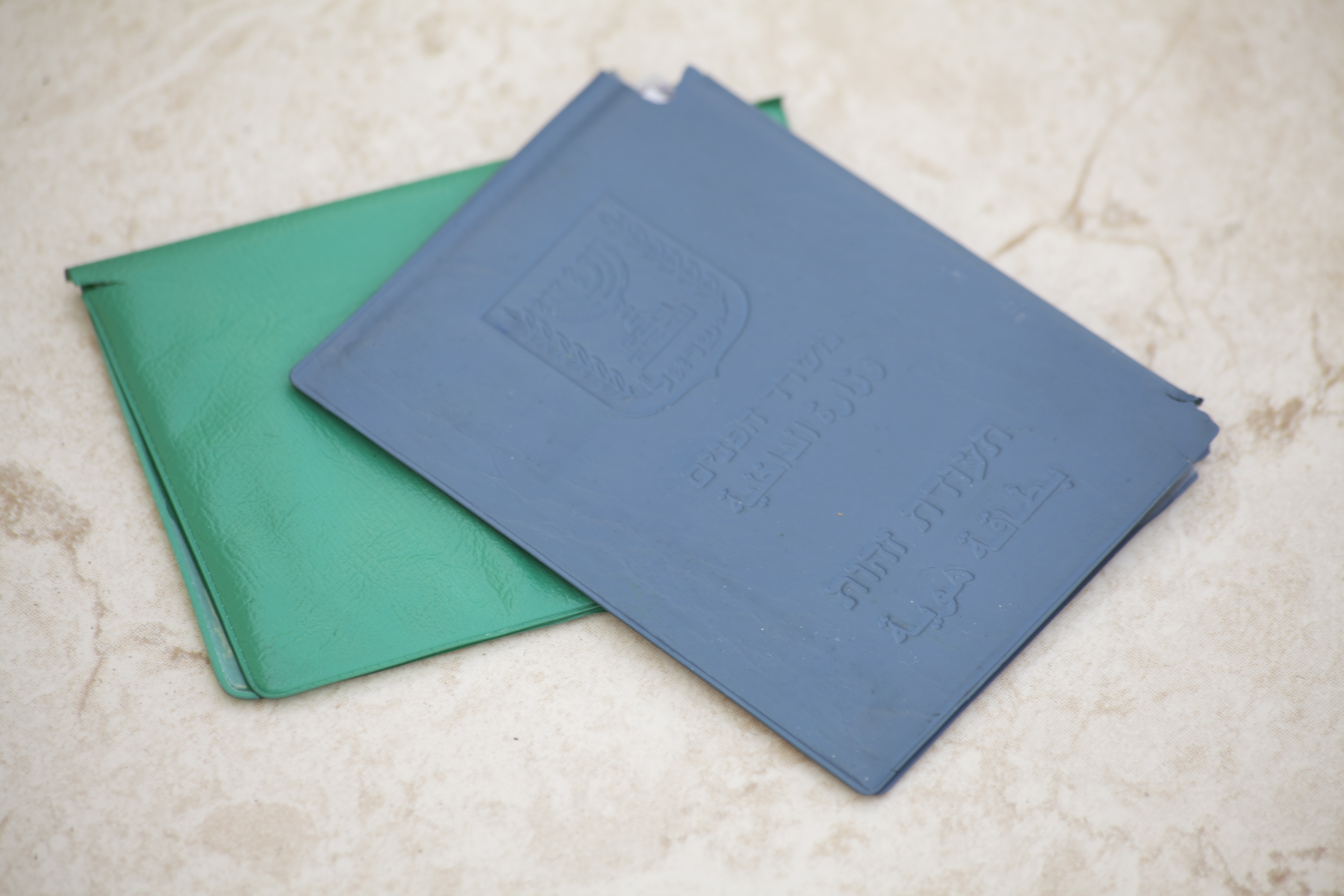
A Palestinian ID card (green) next to an Israeli ID card (blue)

In the early 2000s, the Palestinian Authority changed the color of the Palestinian identity card cover to green for Palestinians of both the West Bank and Gaza Strip.

== Legislation ==
The 1999 Civil Status Law sets the legal basis for the Palestinian ID card. Key provisions include:

- Every Palestinian aged sixteen or above must obtain an identity card.
- The Civil Status Directorate of the Palestinian Ministry of Interior is the sole authority permitted to issue identity cards.
- Anyone who obtains Palestinian citizenship must apply for an ID card within 90 days, and anyone who loses nationality must surrender their ID within the same period.
- No person may hold more than one identity card. Anyone who fails to obtain an ID after turning sixteen is subject to a fine of no less than fifteen Jordanian dinars or its equivalent in Israeli shekels.

Under Law No. 3 of 2008, which amended the 1999 Civil Status Law, two additional provisions regarding identity cards were introduced:

- A wife may not change her family name to that of her husband.
- The husband's full four-part name must be added to the ID annex.

== Contents ==
Palestinian identity cards are issued in a laminated booklet format, kept inside a plastic cover alongside a folded supplement sheet ("ID annex").

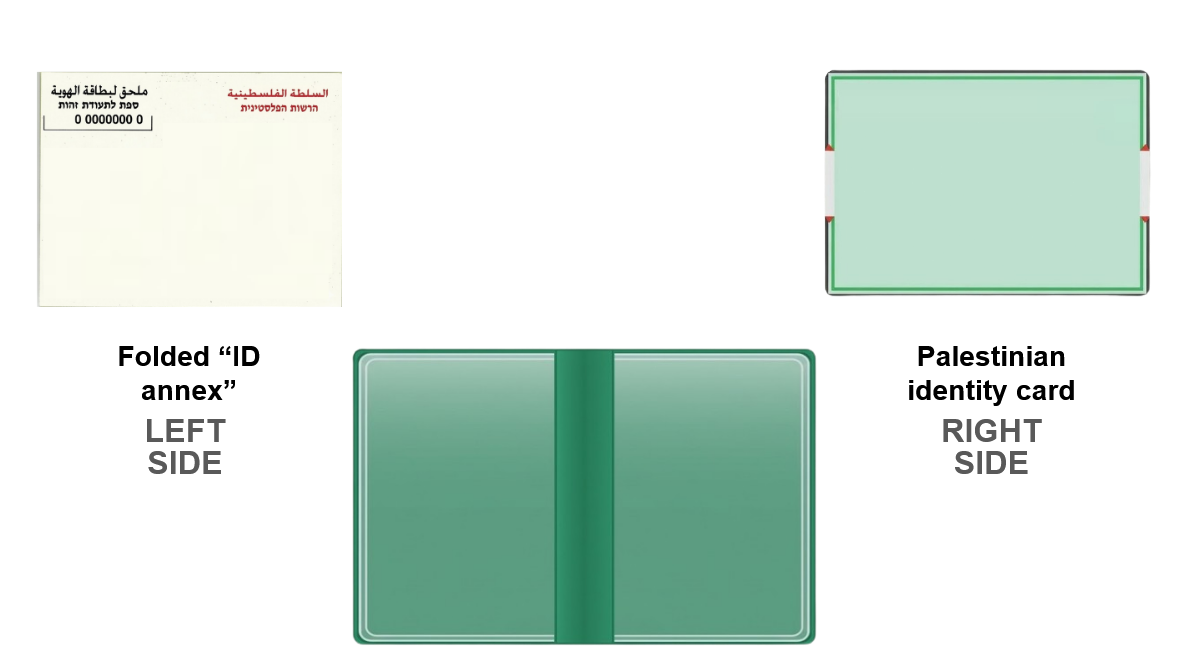
Detailed visual of the contents of the Palestinian identity card

The following information appears on the card, written in both Arabic and Hebrew.

- ID number
- Given name
- Father's name
- Grandfather's name
- Family name
- Mother's name
- Date of birth
- Place of birth
- Gender
- Religion (removed in 2014)
- Place of issue
- Date of issue
- Stamp of the Civil Status Directorate

The supplementary ID annex (an additional piece of paper), stored in the second pocket of the plastic cover, contains:

- Family name
- Given name
- Address
- Marital status
- Name of spouse
- Spouse's ID number
- Previous family name
- Previous given name
- Names and ID numbers of children under 16 and their birth dates
- Sections for elections, change of address, and corrections

== See also ==
- Identity document
- Palestinian passport
- Visa policy of Palestine
- Visa requirements for Palestinian citizens
- Palestinian right of return
