= Kissinger Plan in Lebanon =

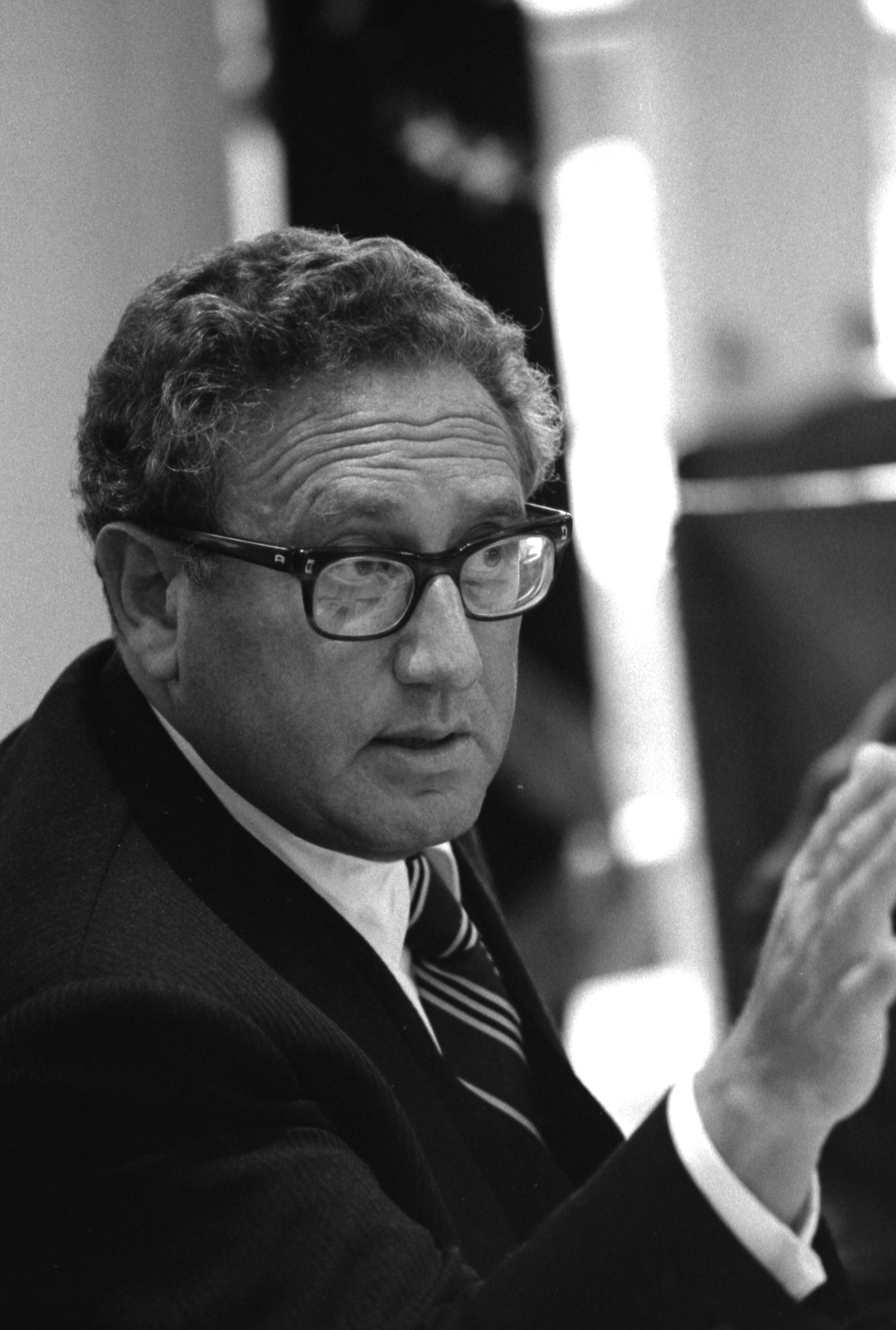
Henry Kissinger during a meeting discussing the situation in Lebanon

The Kissinger Plan in Lebanon is a conspiracy theory about alleged political strategies of the former US Secretary of State Henry Kissinger in Lebanon, who played a complex role in the Lebanese Civil War (1975–1990) and the region. One of the most contentious claims is that Kissinger had a plan to evacuate Lebanese Christians from the country by ships, facilitating the resettlement of Palestinian refugees in Lebanon.

The theory which has circulated in the Middle-East, particularly among some Lebanese and Arab communities, has no concrete evidence supporting its existence and has been dismissed by many analysts and scholars.

Kissinger's broader strategy aimed at stabilizing Lebanon through US mediation between Lebanon and its neighbors, particularly Israel. However, his policies are also criticized for contributing to the instability that led to the prolonged civil war and subsequent Syrian occupation of Lebanon.

== The alleged plan ==
- Some claim that Kissinger proposed resettling Lebanese Christians in the West to allow Palestinian refugees to settle in Lebanon and end the conflict. However, this remains unconfirmed.
- In 1976, US envoy Dean Brown allegedly communicated to former Lebanese President Camille Chamoun plans to move Lebanese Christians to Canada or the US, but the intentions behind this are unclear.
- Critics argue Kissinger neglected the Palestinian issue in Lebanon out of contempt for the parties involved and to flatter Israel, fueling tensions.
- It remains unclear if the US encouraged Syria's intervention in Lebanon in 1976 to subdue the Palestine Liberation Organization (PLO) and Lebanese left in favor of Christian groups aligned with US objectives, or if Syria sought US approval fearing the rise of Palestinian factions.

== Bibliography ==
- Master of the Game: Henry Kissinger and the Art of Middle East Diplomacy by Martin Indyk
- The Kissinger Legacy, American-Middle East Policy, by Ishaq I. Ghanayem, Alden H. Voth
