= Jordanian passport =

Travel document

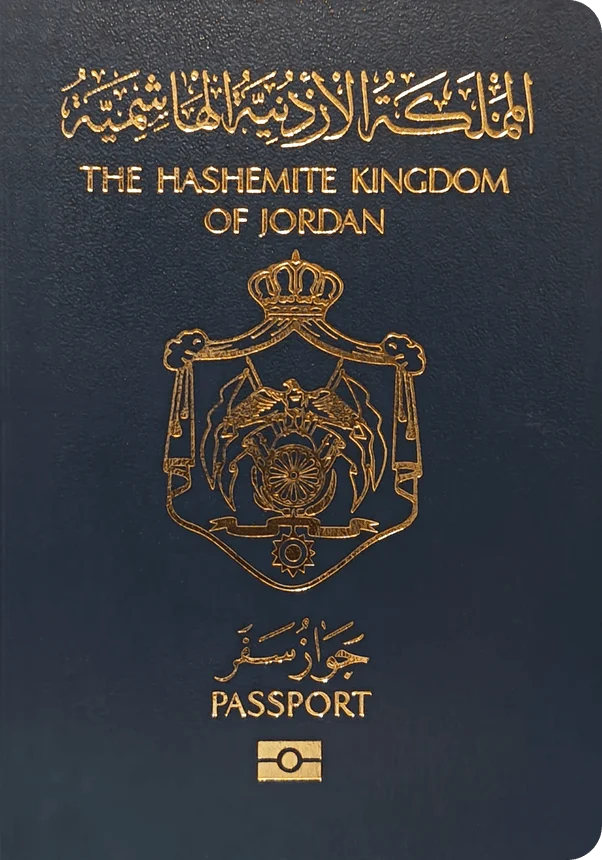
- Front cover of an ordinary Jordanian passport (with chip), issued since 2025
- Type: Passport
- Issued by: Jordan Civil Status and Passport Department (CSPD)
- Purpose: Identification
- Eligibility: Jordanian citizenship
- Expiration: 5 years
- Cost: 20-250 JOD

The Jordanian passport (Arabic: جواز السفر الأردني) is issued by the Civil Status and Passport Department (CSPD) for international travel.

== Passport types ==
Jordan issues multiple types of passports:

- Regular passport with a national number: Issued to Jordanian citizens with full Jordanian nationality privileges.
- Regular passport without a national number: Issued to Palestinians in Israeli-occupied East Jerusalem who are unable to obtain a Palestinian passport due to not holding Palestinian citizenship. Some Palestinians of East Jerusalem may instead hold Israeli travel documents if they are considered stateless. Palestinians with Palestinian citizenship may also apply for one in Jordan, subject to approval. They start with the letter T, denoting "Temporary". These temporary passports are for travel purposes and do not grant civil rights such as voting or government employment in Jordan.
- Diplomatic passport: issued to the government officers who hold the Special Rank, House of Representatives, and Senate. It's distinguished by its red cover.

== Physical Appearance ==
Jordan's passport is blue. The front side of the passport shows Jordan's coat of arms, with the name of the country above it and the inscription "PASSPORT" below it, as you can see on the image on the right. The passport contains the holder's name, photograph, signature, and date of birth, and other factors that help identify them.

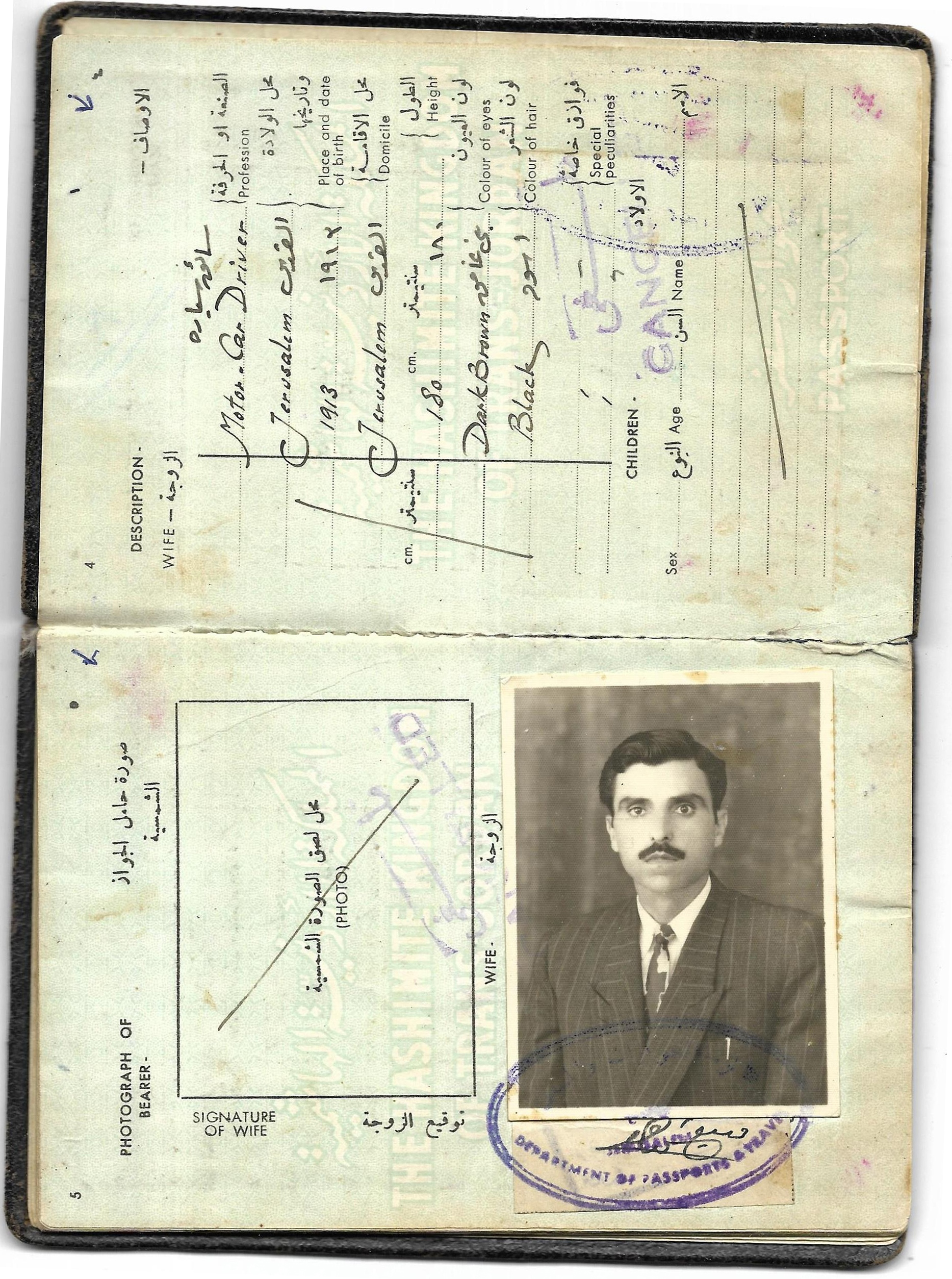
1951 Jordanian passport issued in East Jerusalem.

=== Identity page ===
- Photo of passport holder (35x45 mm; Head height: 33mm; Distance from the top of the photo to the top of the hair: 4mm)
- Type ("P" for passport)
- Country code
- Passport serial number
- Passport holder's first and last name
- Nationality
- Date of birth (DD MM YYYY)
- Gender (M for male or F for female)
- Place of birth
- Date of Issue (DD MM YYYY)
- Passport Holder's signature
- Validity date (ID.M.YYYY)

Passport written in Arabic and English.

== Visa requirements ==
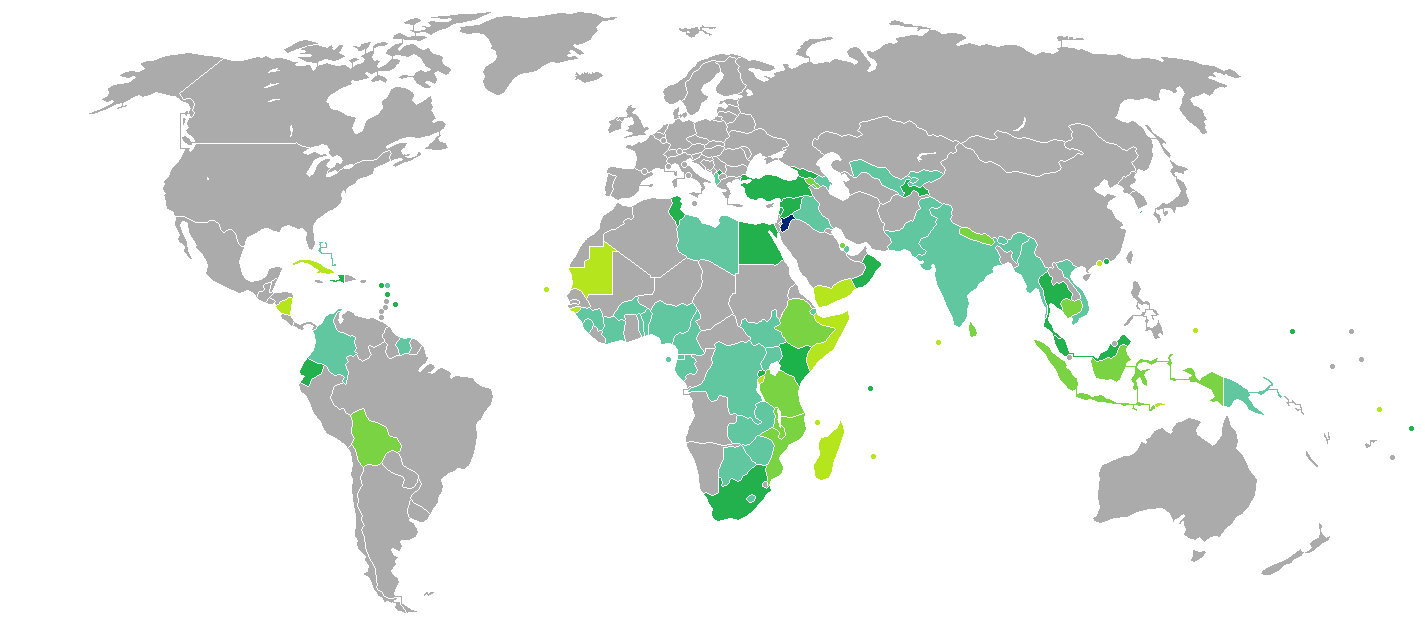
Countries and territories with visa-free or visa on arrival entry for holders of regular Jordanian passports Jordan Visa free access Visa on arrival eVisa Visa available both on arrival or online Visa required

Visa requirements for Jordanian citizens are administrative entry restrictions on holders of Jordanian passports. As of 2025, according to Henley Passport Index, Jordanian citizens have visa-free or visa-on-arrival access to 51 countries and territories, ranking the Jordanian passport 84th in terms of travel freedom.

== See also ==
- Visa requirements for Jordanian citizens
