= Mandatory Palestine passport =

Historical passport

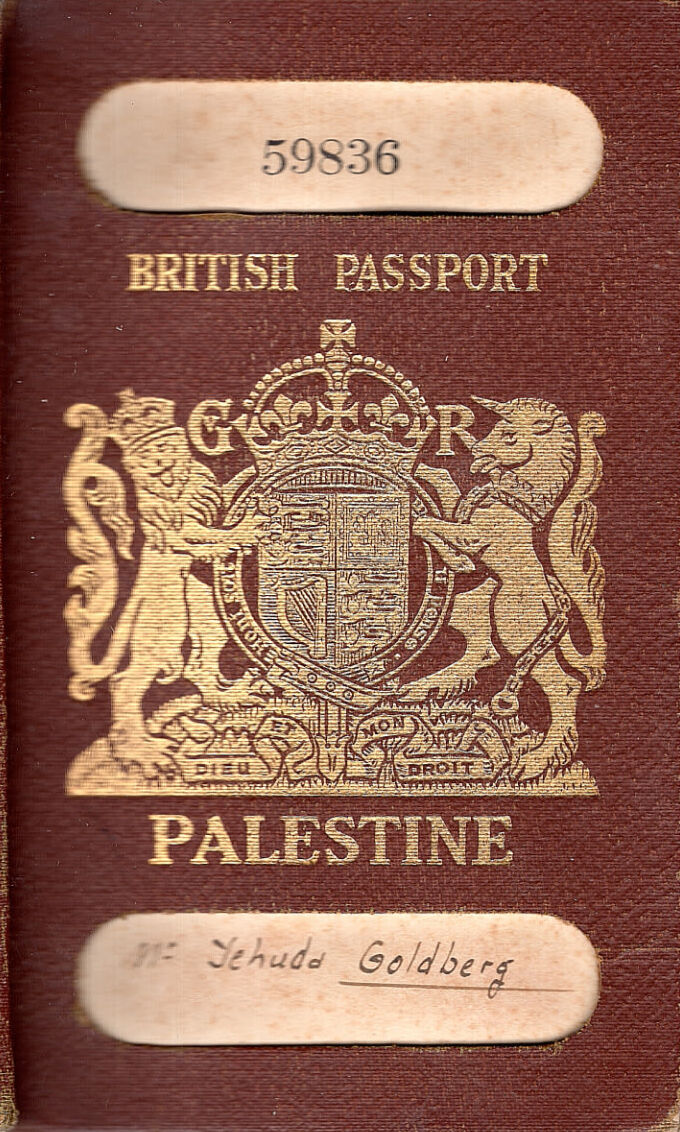
- The front cover of a Mandatory Palestine passport
- Type: Passport
- Issued by: British Mandate for Palestine
- Purpose: Identification

Mandatory Palestine passports were travel documents issued by British authorities in Mandatory Palestine to residents between 1925 and 1948. The first brown-covered passport appeared around 1927, following the issue of the Palestinian Citizenship Order 1925. From 1926 to 1935 alone approximately 70,000 of such travel documents were issued.

== Before 1925 citizenship law ==
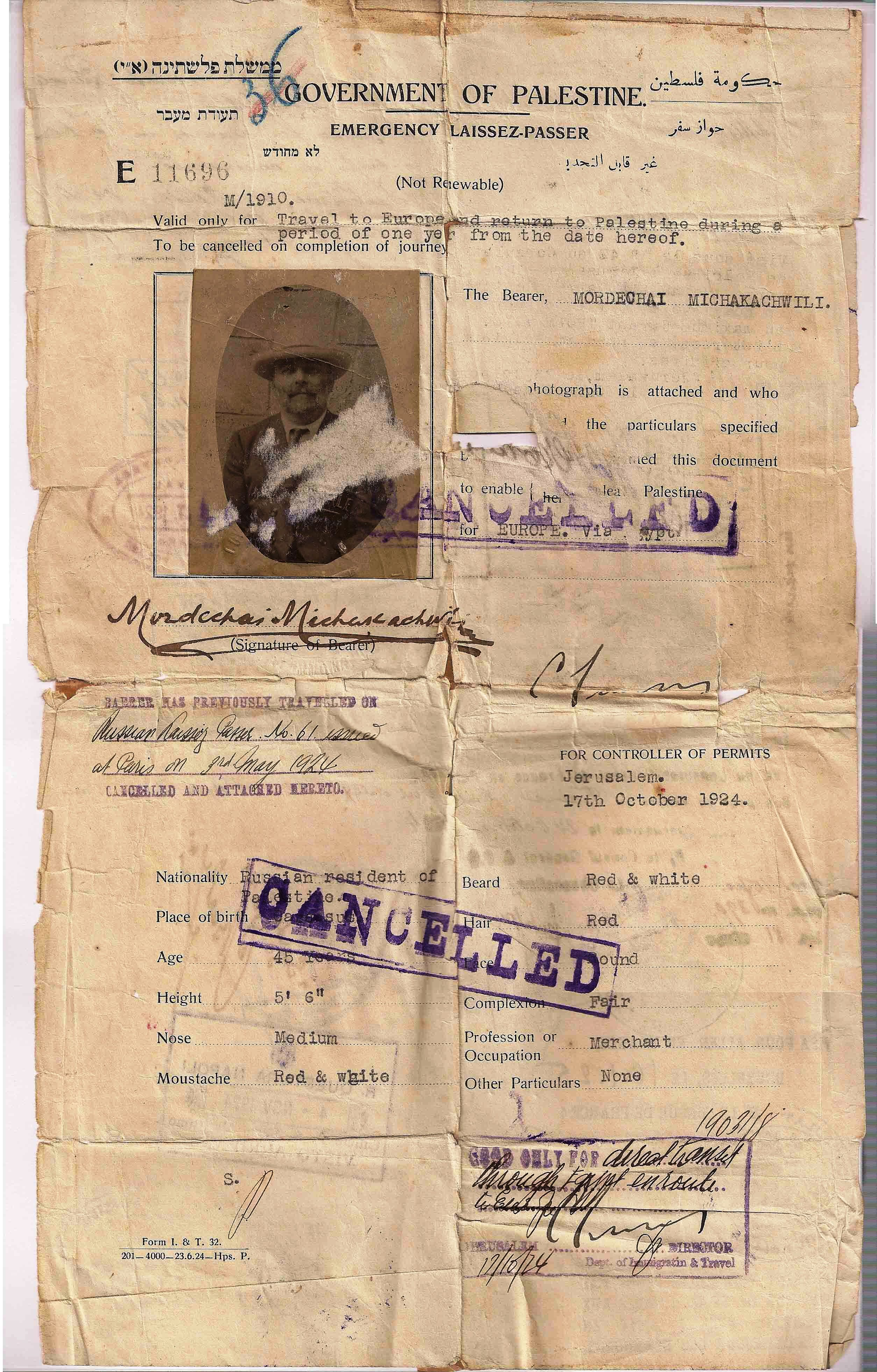
Before the introduction of passports, the British issued emergency laissez-passers, as seen in this example from 1924. The issuing entity is given as "Palestine" in English, "فلسطين" (Palestine) in Arabic, and "פלשתינה (א״י)" (Palestine plus the acronym for Eretz Yisrael) in Hebrew.

Before the citizenship law of 1925, the Government of Palestine issued British passports to those with British nationality, and two types of travel document to others:

1. A Provisional Certificate of Palestinian Nationality was available to persons who had indicated their intention to become Mandatory Palestine's citizens and live in Palestine, provided they were born in Palestine, their father was born in Palestine, or they were an "ex-Russian subject who compulsorily acquired Ottoman nationality in Palestine during the recent war". The wives of such people were also eligible from late 1924.
2. An emergency laissez-passer. An ordinance allowing the High Commissioner to issue passports to Mandatory Palestine's citizens was promulgated soon afterwards.

== Status of residents: 1925 law ==
The status of Mandatory Palestine's citizenship was not legally defined until 1925. Mandatory Palestine's citizenship and the various means of obtaining it was defined in an Order in Council of 24 July 1925.

Turkish subjects habitually resident in Palestine (excluding Transjordan) on the first day of August 1925 automatically became citizens unless they opted to reject it. Many other classes of people were able to apply for citizenship, which would be granted at the discretion of the High Commissioner.

Palestinian natives living abroad were given two years to apply for Palestinian citizenship, but the High Commissioner soon reduced this to about one year, creating a class of stateless persons who had lost their Ottoman citizenship but were unable to obtain Palestinian citizenship.

Although the nature of Mandatory Palestine's citizenship had been debated within the British government since 1920, the main reason it was delayed was that Turkish citizens were officially enemy aliens until the Treaty of Lausanne was ratified in 1923.

=== Rights ===
Palestinian citizens had the right of abode in Palestine, but were not British subjects, and were instead considered British protected persons.

== After 1948 ==
Mandatory Palestine passports ceased to be valid on the termination of the Mandate on 15 May 1948. Even so, in the early 1950s, United Nations officials described the "worn dog-eared Palestine passport issued in Mandate days by a government that no longer legally exists" as "mementos of identity that were treasured by refugees". Israeli, All-Palestine Government passports and Jordanian passports were offered to former British Mandate subjects according to the citizenship they acquired in the aftermath of the 1948 Arab-Israeli War. A significant number of Arab Palestinians, especially in the Gaza Strip and those who found refuge in Syria and Lebanon, remained stateless.

== See also ==
- Palestinian passport
- Israeli passport
- Jordanian passport
- Egyptian passport
