= Palestinians in Lebanon =

Palestinian refugees in Lebanon

Palestinians in Lebanon الفلسطينيون في لبنان
Total population
- 174,422 (2017 census) – 250,000 (2023 UNRWA estimated max. resident) – 489,292 (2023 UNRWA registered)

Regions with significant populations
- Greater Beirut, Sidon, Tripoli, Beqaa Valley

Languages
- Arabic (Palestinian Arabic, Lebanese Arabic)

Religion
- Sunni Islam, Christianity

Palestinians in Lebanon include the Palestinian refugees who fled to Lebanon during the Nakba, their descendants, the Palestinian militias which resided in Lebanon in the 1970s and 1980s, and Palestinian nationals who moved to Lebanon from countries experiencing conflict, such as Syria. There are roughly 3,000 registered Palestinians and their descendants who hold no identification cards, including refugees of the 1967 Naksa. Many Palestinians in Lebanon are refugees and their descendants, who have been barred from naturalisation, retaining stateless refugee status. Palestinians in Lebanon, including children of Lebanese mothers and Palestinian fathers, face systemic discrimination, with limited access to employment and social services. While some Palestinian Christians, such as women who gained citizenship through marriage to Lebanese nationals, have been naturalized, the state continues to deny citizenship to others.

In 2017, a census by the Lebanese government counted 174,000 Palestinians in Lebanon. Estimates of the number of Palestinians in Lebanon ranged from 260,000 to 400,000 in 2011. Human Rights Watch estimated 300,000 in 2011. The United Nations Relief and Works Agency (UNRWA) reported 489,292 registered Palestine refugees as of March 2023 but estimated that no more than 250,000 were then resident in Lebanon.

Most Palestinians in Lebanon do not have Lebanese citizenship and therefore do not have Lebanese identity cards, which would entitle them to government services, such as health and education. They are also legally barred from owning property or entering a list of desirable occupations. Employment requires a government-issued work permit, and, according to the New York Times in 2011, although "Lebanon hands out and renews hundreds of thousands of work permits every year to people from Africa, Asia and other Arab countries... until now, only a handful have been given" to Palestinians. Palestinians in Lebanon also have to heavily rely on the UNRWA for basic services such as healthcare and education, because they are not granted much access to the social services the Lebanese government provides. This reliance on healthcare and education does not guarantee that this reliance has always been visible, oftentimes UNRWA for instance was not allowed to enter certain areas, this was especially the case when tensions were high. Nonetheless, while UNRWA currently is allowed to enter inside these camps, many critique the manner in which UNRWA operates, they point out towards the lack of basic healthcare or any other form of relief inside these Palestinian camps. In February 2011, a decree was signed by Boutros Harb, the caretaker labor minister of Lebanon, on carrying out labor law amendments from August 2010. If these labor law amendments go into effect, it will make it easier for work permits to be acquired by Palestinians. The amendments are seen as "the first move to legalize the working status of Palestinians since the first refugees arrived, fleeing the 1948 Arab-Israeli war".

In 2019, Minister of Labor Camille Abousleiman instituted a law that Palestinian workers must obtain a work permit, under the justification that Palestinians are foreigners in Lebanon despite their long-standing presence. Palestinians are in a 'grey area' of Lebanon's labor laws: although they are categorized as foreigners, they are excluded from the rights foreigners enjoy, and their rights as refugees are not fairly protected. The ruling catalyzed a swell of frustration and protests across the Palestinian camps in Lebanon. Activists claimed the law unfairly targeted Palestinian refugees, and would narrow down an already limited set of employment opportunities.

== Definition ==
2017 VOA report about the plight of Palestinians in Lebanon

UNRWA defines a Palestinian refugee as "any person whose normal place of residence was Palestine during the period June 1, 1946 to May 15, 1948. And who lost both home and means of livelihood as a result of the 1948 conflict." Descendants of male refugees are also able to register with UNRWA.

Palestinians in Lebanon include Palestinian refugees registered with UNRWA and the Lebanese authorities, Palestinian refugees registered only with the Lebanese authorities, and Non-ID Palestinians. According to the 2017 - 2021 Lebanon crisis response plan, there are an estimated 3000 to 5000 Non-ID Palestinians who reside in Lebanon. Some of whom were previously registered as UNRWA refugees in Egypt and Jordan, but now hold expired, unrenewable or unrecognizable identity cards by the respective issuing authorities. Non-ID Palestinians also refer to members of the PLO, who came to Lebanon following Black September. Non-ID Palestinians are able to obtain temporary identification papers by the Lebanese government, although these must be renewed yearly and are subject to conditions, such as inability to register formalities such as marriage, divorce and death.

As a result of the Syrian civil war, 44,000 Palestinian refugees from Syria fled to Lebanon. Recent figures in the 2017-2021 Lebanon crises response plan places the number at 29,000.

== Demographics ==
Estimates of the number of Palestinians in Lebanon ranged from 260,000 to 400,000 in 2011. In 2018 Human Rights Watch estimated 174,000 "longstanding" Lebanese refugees and 45,000 Lebanese refugees more recently displaced from Syria.

UNRWA reported that "as of March 2023, the total number of registered Palestine Refugees in Lebanon is 489,292 persons" and that "UNRWA records show a total of 31,400 Palestine Refugees from Syria residing in Lebanon", but that registration is voluntary and may not be updated with deaths and emigrations. UNRWA estimated no more than 250,000 currently resident in Lebanon In 2017, a Lebanese government census counted a total of 193,023 Palestinians living in the refugee camps in Lebanon, split between 174,422 Palestinian refugees of Lebanon (PRL) and 18,601 Palestinian refugees of Syria (PRS), half of the total were under the age of 24.

As of February 2025, UNRWA Lebanon Field Office reported a total of 222,000 Palestinians living in Lebanon, 195,000 of whom were Lebanese Palestinians and 27,000 Syrian Palestinians. As of February 2025, the total number of UNRWA-registered Palestinian Refugees in Lebanon was just under 500,000 persons. However this number does not account for emigration and deaths as registration with UNRWA is voluntary and refugees can continue registering newborns as they move abroad through the UNRWA online registration system. As of March 2026, UNRWA estimates that about 248,000 Palestinian refugees and their family members access UNRWA services in Lebanon.

Distribution of the Palestinian refugee population by regions in 2017, including Palestinian refugees of Lebanon (PRL) and Palestinian refugees of Syria (PRS)
| Region | Population of PRL | Population of PRS | Total population | Share of the total |
|---|---|---|---|---|
| North | 41,495 | 3,859 | 45,354 | 24.7% |
| Beirut | 22,149 | 1,619 | 23,768 | 13% |
| Mount Lebanon | 11,752 | 1,978 | 13,730 | 7.5% |
| Saida | 59,201 | 5,550 | 64,751 | 35.3% |
| Tyre | 24,410 | 2,706 | 27,116 | 14.8% |
| Beqaa | 6,542 | 1,994 | 8,536 | 4.7% |
| Total | 165,549 | 17,706 | 183,255 | 100% |

== Legal status ==
=== Nationality ===
Most Palestinians in Lebanon are stateless. They are not entitled to Lebanese citizenship, though most were born in Lebanon and irrespective of how many generations their families have lived in Lebanon.

Lebanese government gave citizenship to about 50,000 Christian Palestinian refugees during the 1950s and 1960s. In the mid-1990s, about 60,000 Shiite Muslim refugees were granted citizenship. This caused a protest from Maronite authorities, leading to citizenship being given to all Christian refugees who were not already citizens.

During the Syrian occupation of Lebanon in 1994, the government naturalized over 154,931 foreign residents of Palestinian (mostly Palestinian Christians) and Syrian (mostly Syrian Sunnis and Christians) descent. It was argued that the purpose of these naturalizations was to sway the elections to a pro-Syrian government. This allegation is based on how these new citizens were bussed in to vote and displayed higher voting rates than the nationals did.

=== Other restrictions ===
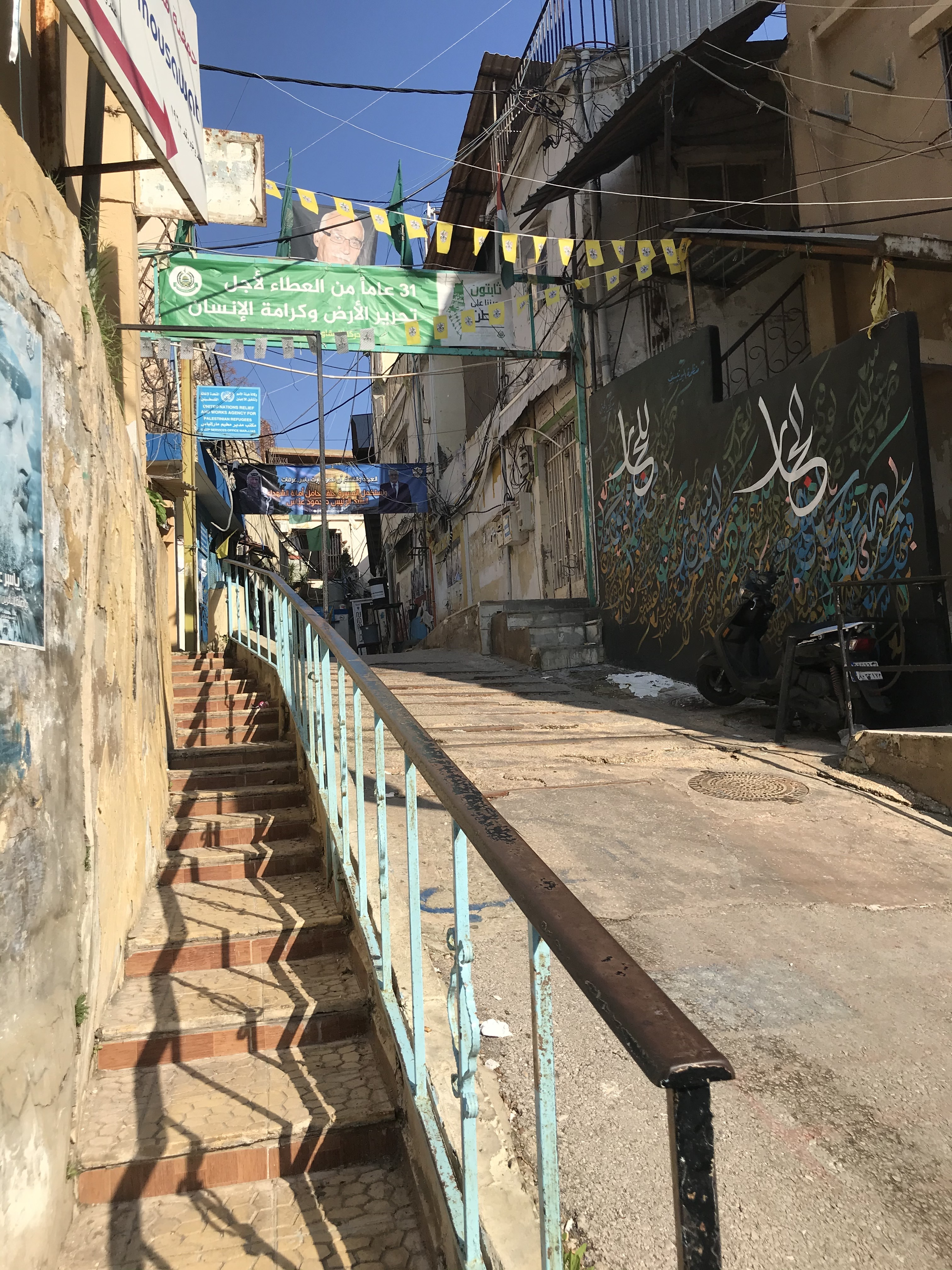
Mar Elias Refugee Camp, Beirut

Without citizenship, Palestinians in Lebanon do not have Lebanese identity cards, which also entitles the holder to health care, education and other government services. Palestinians living in and outside the 12 official camps, can receive health care, education and other social services from UNRWA. According to Human Rights Watch, Palestinian refugees in Lebanon live in "appalling social and economic conditions."

Following a 2001 amendment on foreign ownership of property, which stated that the foreign person must hold the citizenship of an internationally recognized country, Palestinian refugees came to be excluded from land and property ownership. Non-citizen Palestinians are legally barred from owning property, and barred from entering a list of liberal professions.

Employment requires a government-issued work permit, and, according to the New York Times, although "Lebanon hands out and renews hundreds of thousands of work permits every year to people from Africa, Asia and other Arab countries... until now, only a handful have been given" to Palestinians. They labor under legal restrictions that bar them from employment in at least 39 professions, "including law, medicine, and engineering," a system that relegates them to the black market for labor. According to the 2017 census conducted by the Lebanese government, more than 90% of Palestinian refugees in Lebanon are informally employed.

In 2016, Lebanese authorities began constructing a concrete wall with watch towers around the Ain al-Hilweh refugee camp, the largest Palestinian refugee camp in Lebanon. The wall has faced some criticism, being called "racist" by some and supposedly labeling residents as terrorists or islamists. As of May 2017, the wall construction was nearing completion.

For travel abroad non-citizen Palestinian residents of Lebanon can obtain travel documents that serve in place of passports. Travellers who hold only a Palestinian passport are refused entry to Lebanon.

== Social status ==
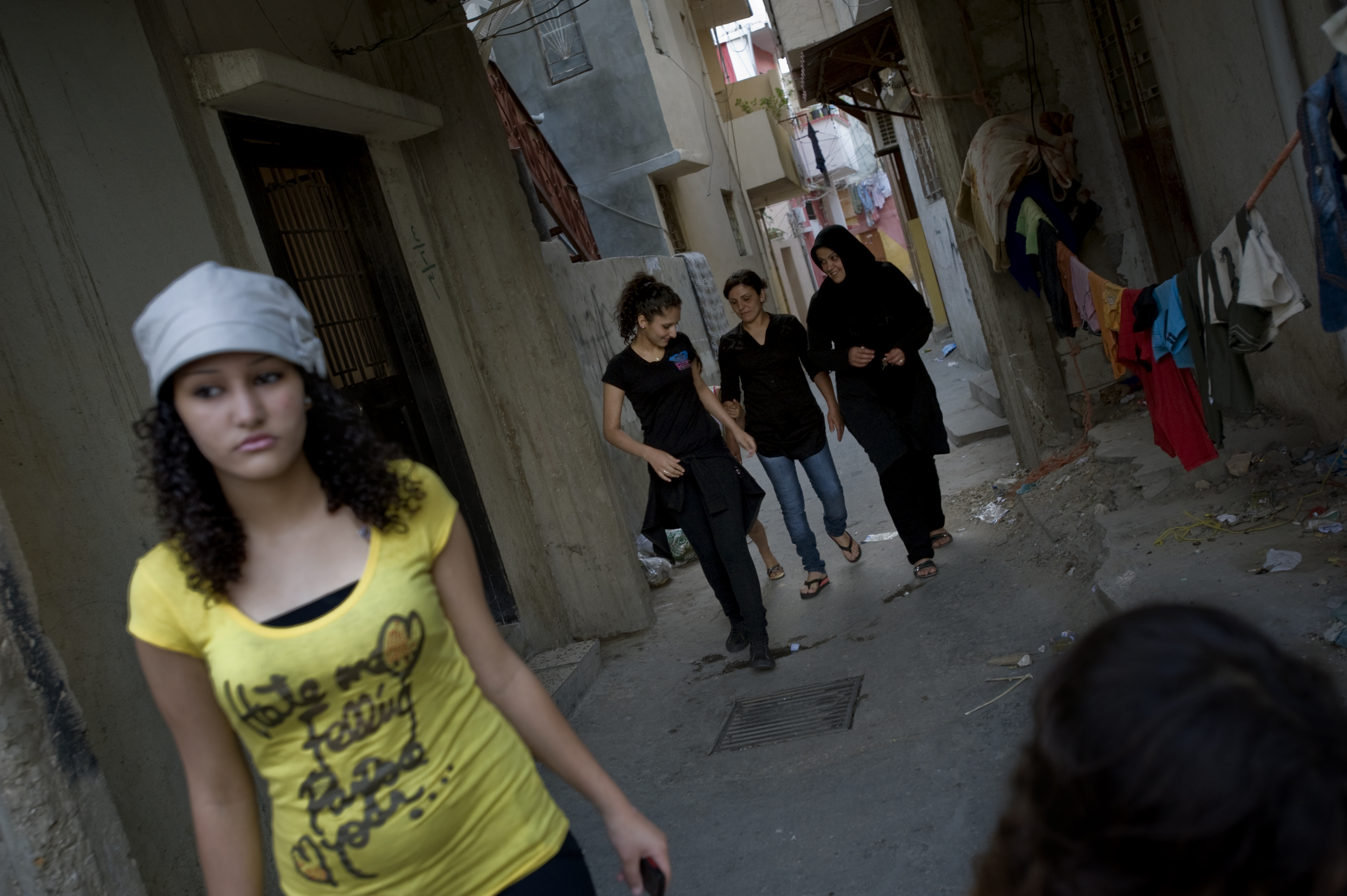
Refugee camp of El Buss

Palestinians in Lebanon also have to heavily rely on UNRWA for basic services such as health care and education, because they do not have much access to the social services the Lebanese government provides. In February 2011, a decree was signed by Boutros Harb, the caretaker labor minister (of Lebanon), on carrying out labor law amendments from August 2010. If these labor law amendments go into effect, it will make it easier for work permits to be acquired by Palestinians. The amendments are seen as "the first move to legalize the working status of Palestinians since the first refugees arrived, fleeing the 1948 Arab-Israeli war".

Share of Palestinian refugees by employment status for individuals aged 15 and above
| Activity status | Female | Male | Total |
|---|---|---|---|
| Employed | 11.9% | 59% | 35.3% |
| Unemployed | 4.5% | 12.5% | 8.5% |
| Inactive (not looking for a job) | 83.6% | 28.5% | 56.2% |

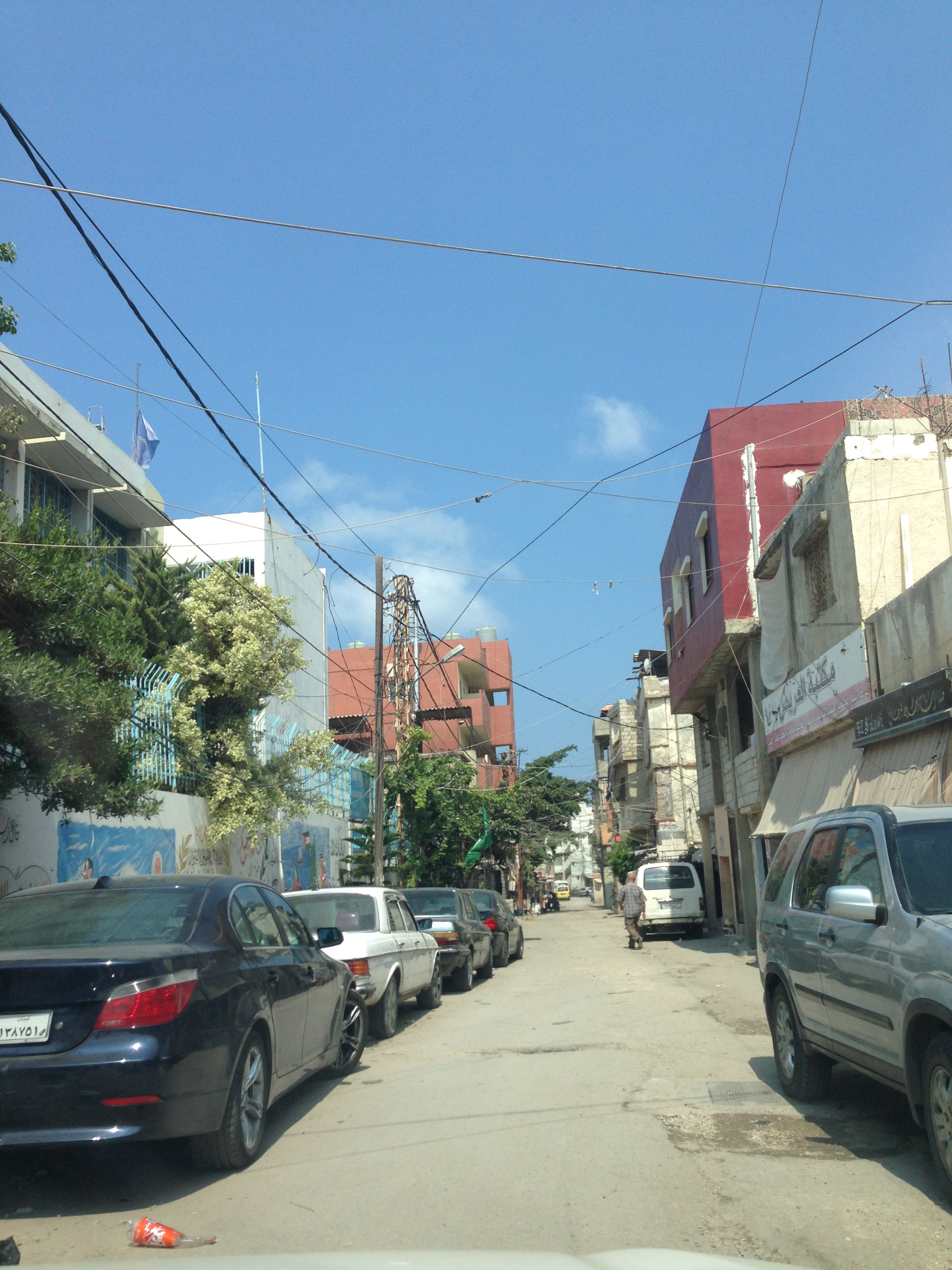
Street in Ain El helweh

The condition of Palestinian refugees in Lebanon has been variously criticized in the media. According to Human Rights Watch, "In 2001, Parliament passed a law prohibiting Palestinians from owning property, a right they had for decades. Lebanese law also restricts their ability to work in many areas. In 2005, Lebanon eliminated a ban on Palestinians holding most clerical and technical positions, provided they obtain a temporary work permit from the Labor Ministry, but more than 20 high-level professions remain off-limits to Palestinians. Few Palestinians have benefited from the 2005 reform, though. In 2009, only 261 of more than 145,679 permits issued to non-Lebanese were for Palestinians. Civil society groups say many Palestinians choose not to apply because they cannot afford the fees and see no reason to pay a portion of their salary toward the National Social Security Fund, since Lebanese law bars Palestinians from receiving social security benefits."

Israeli Arab journalist, Khaled Abu Toameh accused Lebanon of practicing apartheid against Palestinian Arabs who have lived in Lebanon as stateless refugees since 1948. Toameh described the "special legal status" as "foreigners" assigned uniquely to Palestinians, "a fact which has deprived them of health care, social services, property ownership and education. Even worse, Lebanese law bans Palestinians from working in many jobs. This means that Palestinians cannot work in the public services and institutions run by the government such as schools and hospitals. Unlike Israel, Lebanese public hospitals do not admit Palestinians for medical treatment or surgery." Israeli journalist Ben-Dror Yemini describes Palestinians in Lebanon as living "under various restrictions that could fill a chapter on Arab apartheid against the Palestinians. One of the most severe restrictions is a ban on construction. This ban is enforced even in the Nahr al-Bared refugee camp, bombed by the Lebanese army in 2007". Calling on Lebanon to change the systematic discrimination against his people, Palestinian journalist Rami George Khouri compared Lebanese treatment of Palestinians to the "Apartheid system" of South Africa.

Palestinian refugee camps in Lebanon contain armed groups which sometimes deal in illegal drugs, and that would cause infighting among the rivals. In June 2020, a woman was shot dead in the Shatila refugee camp as she was walking on the street carrying her child during a shooting exchange between rival gangs.

== Sectarian tensions ==
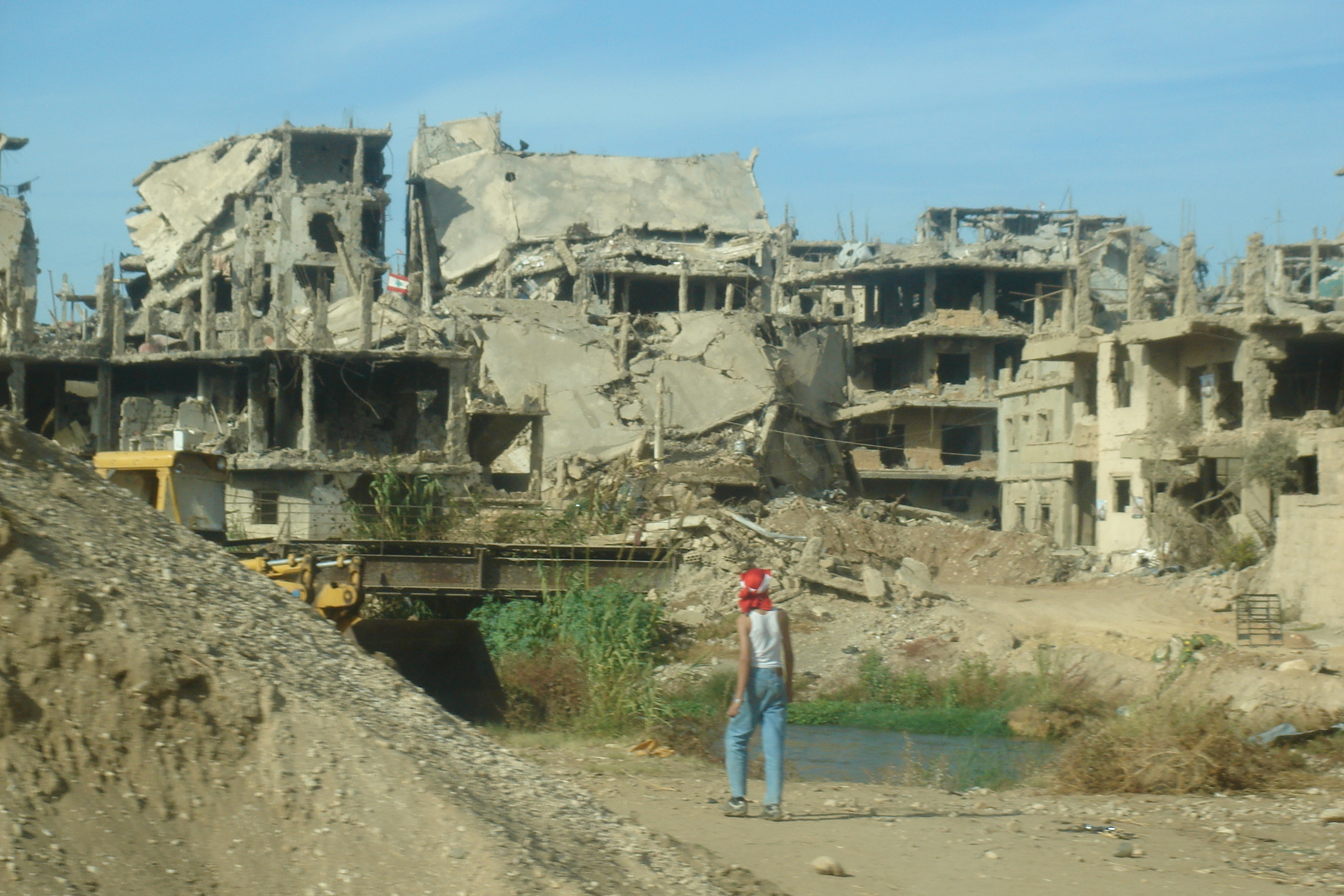
Destruction at Nahr al-Bared, 2007

Due to sectarian tensions carried from the civil war, some discriminatory social attitudes are still held towards Palestinian refugees in Lebanon. These attitudes, are further complicated by Lebanon's delicate sectarian makeup.

Despite the annulment of the 1969 Cairo Agreement, the Lebanese army does not enter the 12 camps, based on an informal understanding between the Palestinian factions and the Lebanese army. There exists some cooperation between the Palestinian factions and Lebanese army.

== See also ==
- PLO in Lebanon
- Palestinians in Egypt
- Palestinians in Jordan
- Palestinians in Iraq
- Palestinians in Syria
- Palestinians in Jordan
