= PLO in Lebanon =

Palestine Liberation Organization in Lebanon

The Palestine Liberation Organization (PLO) was based in Lebanon for a significant period of time (1960s-1982), using their set-up in the country to expand as an organization, gathering support and maintaining their armed struggle with Israel. Arguably, the Lebanon period was the most significant time in the PLO's existence, both for reasons of political gain and international recognition – though it also involved a great deal of violence, displacement of civilians and economic instability. The PLO was able to maintain a strong presence, particularly in Southern Lebanon for a number of years and was often the cause of dissatisfaction and fear amongst Lebanese citizens due to religious tensions and a confusion of structure.

== Late 1960s–1982 ==
The origins of the PLO's presence in Lebanon goes right back to the late 1960s, following the 1967 Six-Day War. There were already large areas of Lebanon populated by Palestinian exile communities, or around 12% of the total population. Lebanese president Charles Helou was anxious about the prospect of nationalist sentiment causing turbulence in Lebanon following the war, which had ignited mass support from Arab communities of the Palestinian cause. Nevertheless, guerrilla networks were increasingly active throughout the late 1960s and were given even more freedom after the Cairo agreement in 1969, in which refugee camps in Lebanon were placed under the command of Palestinian forces, instead of the heavy-handed Deuxième Bureau.

The establishment of the PLO as being based wholly in Lebanon came after king Hussein of Jordan's decision to expel the group from his country in 1970. The Black September movement which formed as the result of the hijacking of planes, which were brought into Jordan. Much of 1970s Lebanon exists in history under the shadow of the lead-up to and subsequent bloody realization of the civil war, which the PLO became embroiled in after initial reluctance of any involvement. It was not in the interests of the PLO to get involved in a conflict which would drain resources and detract focus from the goal of planning insurgencies against Israel.

The end of the PLO's time in Lebanon came abruptly and decisively after Israeli forces invaded Southern Lebanon and forced PLO forces out of the country. As a result of this, the organization had to move its base to Tunis, Tunisia.

== The camps: autonomy and a state within a state ==
The PLO was able to achieve a mini state within Southern Lebanon made up of the hundreds of thousands of refugees who had made camps in the area. Over time, the PLO was able to gain almost complete control over areas of Lebanon using their own police force, military and economic infrastructure although organizationally, this was said to be sporadic in terms of efficiency.

== Conflicting reports of PLO's behaviour ==
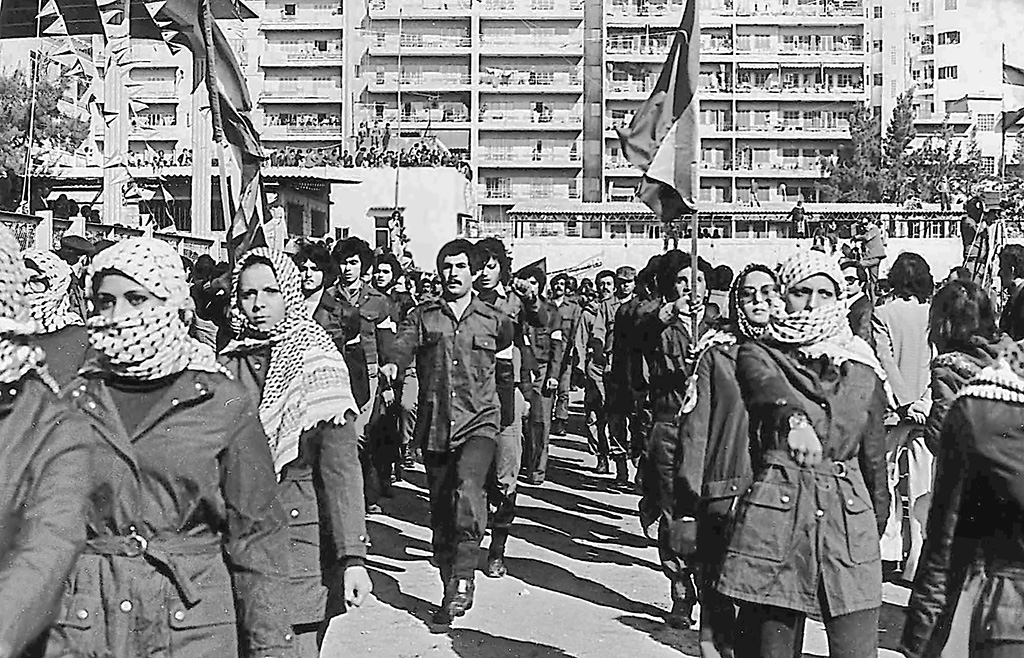
Palestinian fedayeen in Beirut, 1979.

There are varying reports of the PLO's presence in Lebanon, in terms of whether they engaged constructively with Palestinians and Lebanese civilians or whether they were in fact a disorganized and often dangerous presence. There were various key incidents that have contributed to a conflicting view of the era and historians remain in conflict about the true nature of PLO's impact on the country.

The situation in Lebanon was complicated, particularly given that the PLO itself was sometimes divided and various factions played different roles at different times. In 1976, the arrival of a Syrian-organized Palestinian fedayeen made matters even more complex and there are huge numbers of reports of intimidation, torture and murder from Lebanese forces, Israeli forces, PLO or PLO-affiliated groups and non-specific fedayeen soldiers. For example, the initial catalyst for PLO involvement in the internal Lebanese issue could be said to be the Phalange attack on a bus in April 1975. According to one journalistic endeavour from the Jerusalem Post, there was "little or no substantive proof for many of the atrocity stories making the rounds", which suggests that there was generally a deal of hearsay and over-inflated reporting about PLO mistreatment of civilians. However, the academic Jillian Becker has suggested that Lebanon "was destroyed by, and because of, the PLO". Some point to the Damour massacre as a key example of PLO barbarity, although again this was only a response to a Phalange massacre in Karantina days beforehand.

== Media use ==
In Lebanon, the PLO was able to make use of media outlets and resources in order to expand their network of support. One text has suggested that the PLO had a full takeover of the Lebanese media. Publications such as Fatah were published daily from 1970 onward and there were a number of other publications that were published on behalf of the PLO. There was indeed a Department of Culture in the Propaganda and International Centre of the PLO, whose films included The Road to Palestine and The Youth Camp. There are several reports from the PLO's time in Lebanon of threats and against journalists, both foreign and domestic and also of bribes given in return for biased coverage. Senior journalists were known to have been bought off by receiving generously detailed files about an imminent strike against Israel in order that maximum coverage might be ensured.

== International involvement ==
Syria's involvement can be seen as a complicating factor, but also tied the PLO to a position where more compromise was necessary, because of Syria's involvement as being supportive of the Christians. This position changed, however, when Syria's support of the Christians was discontinued. Europe was responsive to the plight of the Palestinians over the course of the PLO's time in Lebanon and France and Greece in particular made efforts in support of the Palestinian cause. The US was less positive in response to the PLO and at one time favoured a policy of isolating the Palestinians, which clearly did not work.

Charlie Wilson, the U.S. congressman responsible for raising funds in order to assist Afghan mujahideen to fight the Soviets, commented that he felt the Israeli forces were welcomed as a liberation army and that the PLO's presence was worth even the tumult of the Israeli invasion.

== Tactical position ==
Whilst in Lebanon, the PLO was able to mount several attacks on Israel from vantage points along the border. The time in Lebanon also afforded the PLO space and resources with which to plan activities in support of the wider cause, including the Munich massacre. Attacks into Israel, including rocket attacks, became the catalyst for Israeli invasions into Lebanon, first in 1978 and again subsequently and decisively in 1982. Although PLO attacks were able to cause disruption, it is not possible to say that they achieved any lasting military gain.

the PLO's positioning in Lebanon did, however, afford the organisation a degree of economic structure and they were able to gain some economic power in this way, by establishing trade links and businesses and by collecting taxes from displaced Palestinians.

== Aftermath ==
Following on from the PLO's forced exile from Lebanon, their power base was diminished and the PLO as an organisation was forced to be further away from the people it sought to fight for. The Lebanese period can in fact be seen as a time of no real development in PLO's desire to achieve statehood, in the main because of its being marred by additional conflicts. Throughout this period in time, the PLO was beginning to accept the concept of a two-state solution and move towards the kind of agreements that would mark the Oslo I Accord, but diplomatic processes were hindered by the conflict. The PLO itself as an organisation was split at times and trust between political groups was minimal.

== See also ==
- Palestinians in Lebanon
- Hamas in Lebanon
