= Nahr al-Bared =

Nahr al-Bared (Arabic: نهر البارد, lit. 'Cold River') may refer to:

- Nahr al-Bared Palestine refugee camp in northern Lebanon
- Nahr Al-Bared (river), a river in northern Lebanon
- Nahr al-Bared, Syria, a village in Syria
