= Visa policy of Palestine =

Policy on permits required to enter Palestine

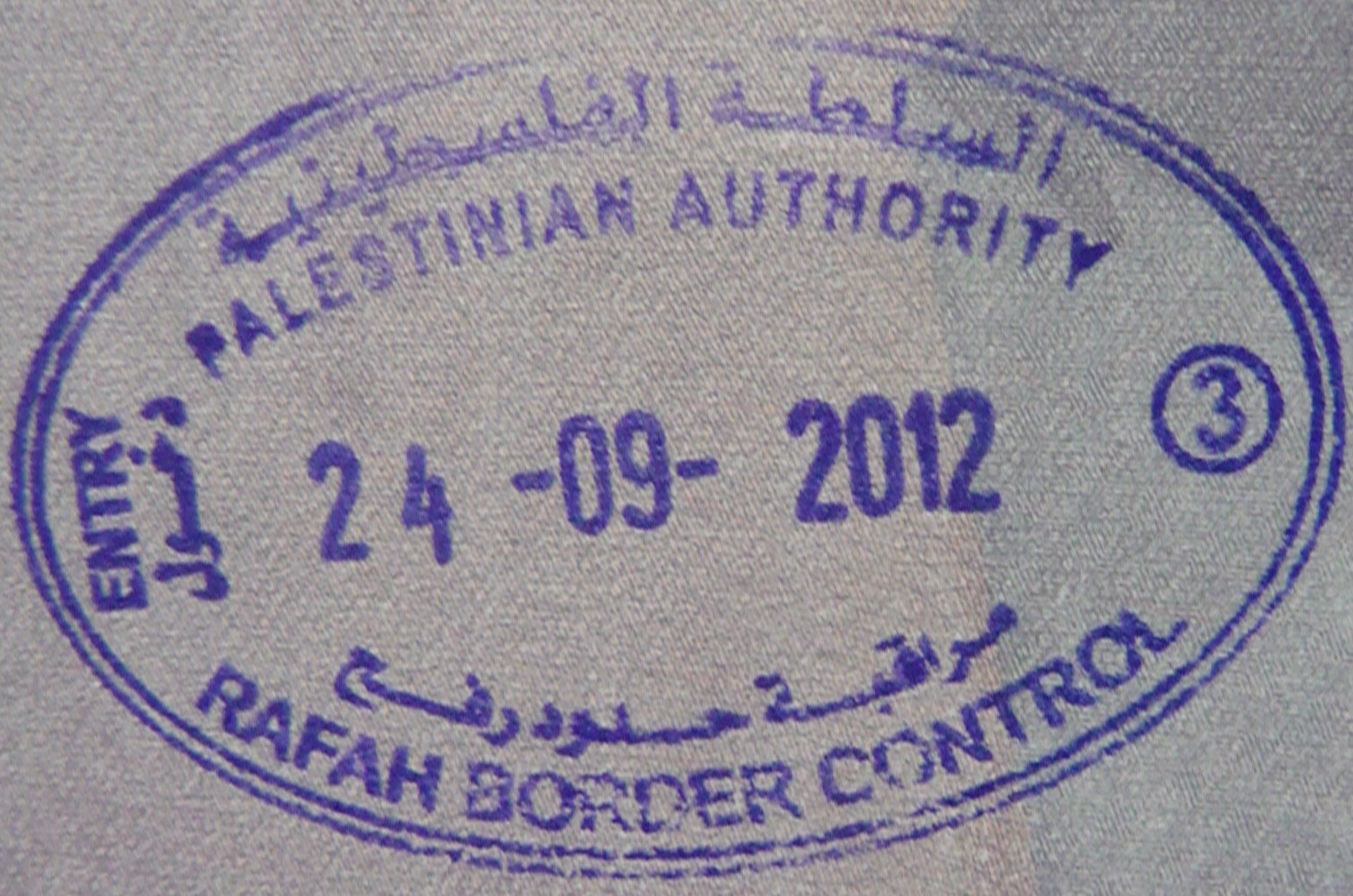
A passport stamp from 2012 of a visa from the Rafah border control office of the Palestinian authority.

The visa policy of Palestine refers to specific entry conditions a visitor must meet to enter Palestine. There are no visa conditions imposed on foreign nationals other than those imposed by the visa policy of Israel.

Access to the West Bank is controlled by the Government of Israel and access to Gaza is controlled by Hamas. Visitors who enter via Allenby Bridge-King Hussein border crossing and make their connections to the West Bank or plans to travel to the West Bank may be given an entry stamp that permits travel only in Palestinian Authority-controlled areas of the West Bank.

Exiting Gaza via the Erez crossing into Israel requires both an exit permit from Hamas and an entry permit from Israel. Israel grants permission primarily to those seeking medical care, but also to some merchants, people working in Israel, and students and athletes going abroad. 2,500 Gaza residents entered Israel via the Erez crossing in December, 2019. Exit through the Rafah border crossing into Egypt is unpredictable and requires prior permission from Egyptian authorities. The crossing often closes for extended time periods in which visitors are unable to leave Gaza Strip.

While crossing border from Jordan into Israel and West Bank, visitors of Palestinian origin need a Palestinian passport or travel document in order to leave and may enter only via Allenby Bridge. Meanwhile, Israeli passport holders are not allowed to enter via Allenby Border Crossing and may only use Jordan River Crossing and Yitzhak Rabin Crossing instead.

== See also ==
- Visa requirements for Palestinian citizens
- Visa policy of Israel
