= Palestinian passport =

Passport issued to Palestinians

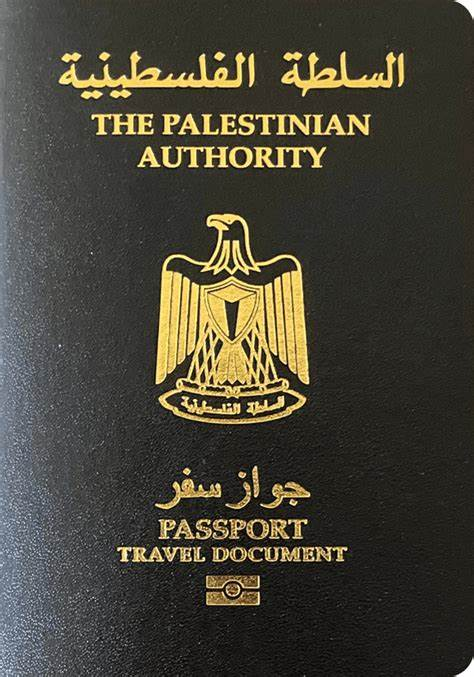
- Front cover of an ordinary Palestinian passport (with chip), issued since 2022
- Type: Passport
- Issued by: Ministry of Interior
- First issued: 1995 (First version), 2009 (New design, valid for 5 years use), 2022 (Biometric passports with new design)
- Purpose: Identification
- Eligibility: Holders of Palestinian hawwiya (ID card), usually residents of areas under Palestinian Authority control.
- Expiration: 5 years after acquisition
- Cost: د.أ 35

The Palestinian passport (Arabic: جواز السفر الفلسطيني) is a passport issued by the State of Palestine for the purpose of international travel based on the agreements established in the 1993 Oslo Accord. It is issued to Palestinians who hold Palestinian citizenship. Most of the Palestinian diaspora are unable to obtain this passport for various reasons, such as security restrictions imposed by the Israeli government or the fact that they do not possess a Palestinian hawwiya (ID card).

== History ==
Between 1924 and 1948, the term "Palestinian passport" referred to the travel documents that were available to residents of Mandatory Palestine. Issued by the High Commissioner for Palestine, they were officially titled, "British passport, Palestine." These passports became invalid following the termination of the British mandate on 15 May 1948, following the declaration of establishment of the State of Israel.

After 1948, Israeli, Jordanian, or other travel documents or passports were offered to former British Mandate subjects according to the citizenship they acquired in the aftermath of the 1948 Arab–Israeli War.

Between 1949 and 1959, the All-Palestine Government issued All-Palestine passports to Palestinian residents of the Gaza Strip and Egypt. However, passport holders were not permitted to travel to Egypt without a visa. In the meantime, Jordan annexed the West Bank and residents of the West Bank became citizens of Jordan.

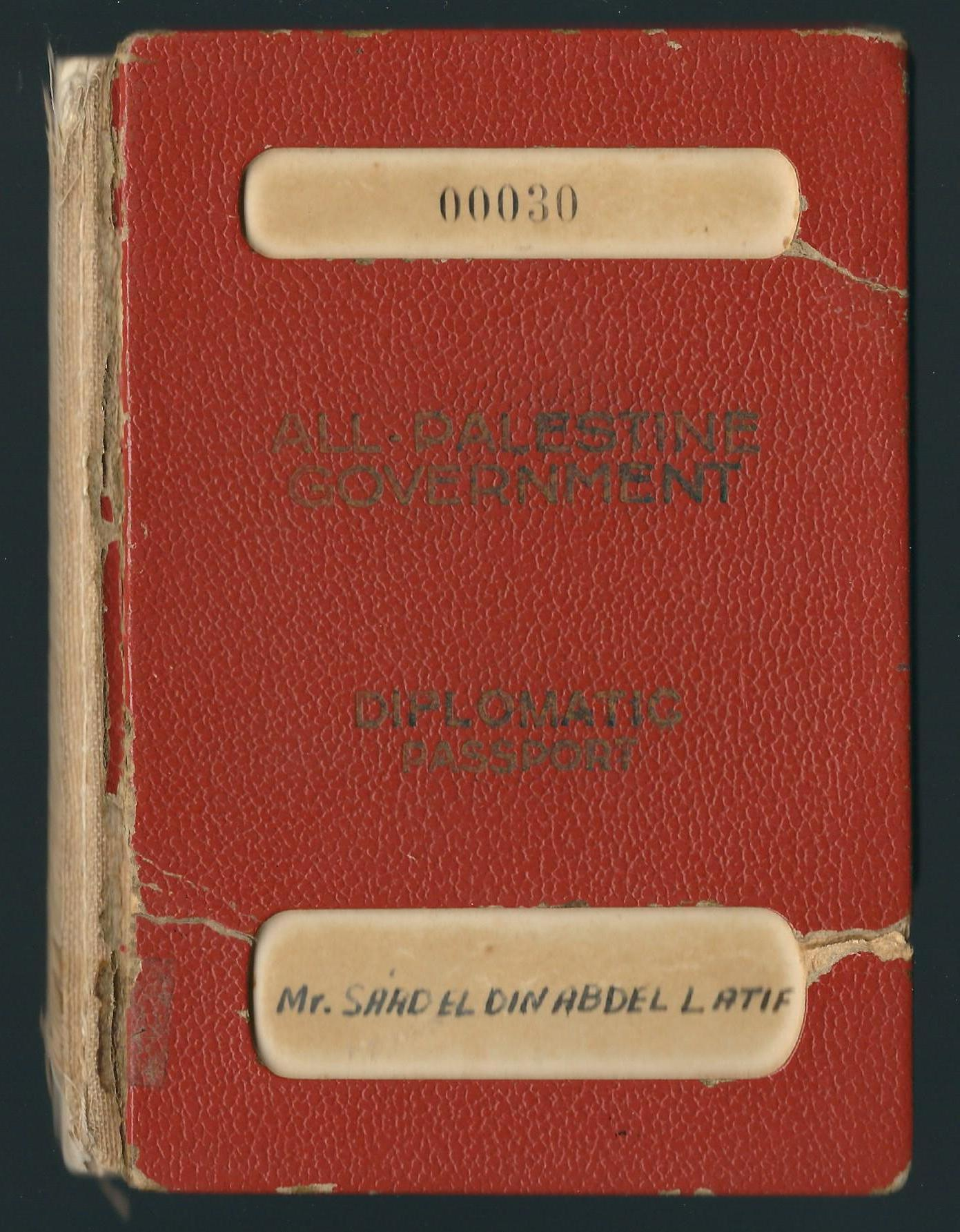
cover of a 1962 All-Palestine Diplomatic passport.

After the 1967 Six-Day War, during which Israel captured the West Bank from Jordan, Arabs of Palestinian origin who lived there remained Jordanian. Palestinian refugees actually living in Jordan were also considered full Jordanian citizens. In July 1988, Jordan severed all legal and administrative ties with the West Bank. Any Palestinian living in Jordan would stay Jordanian; but residents of the West Bank would not.

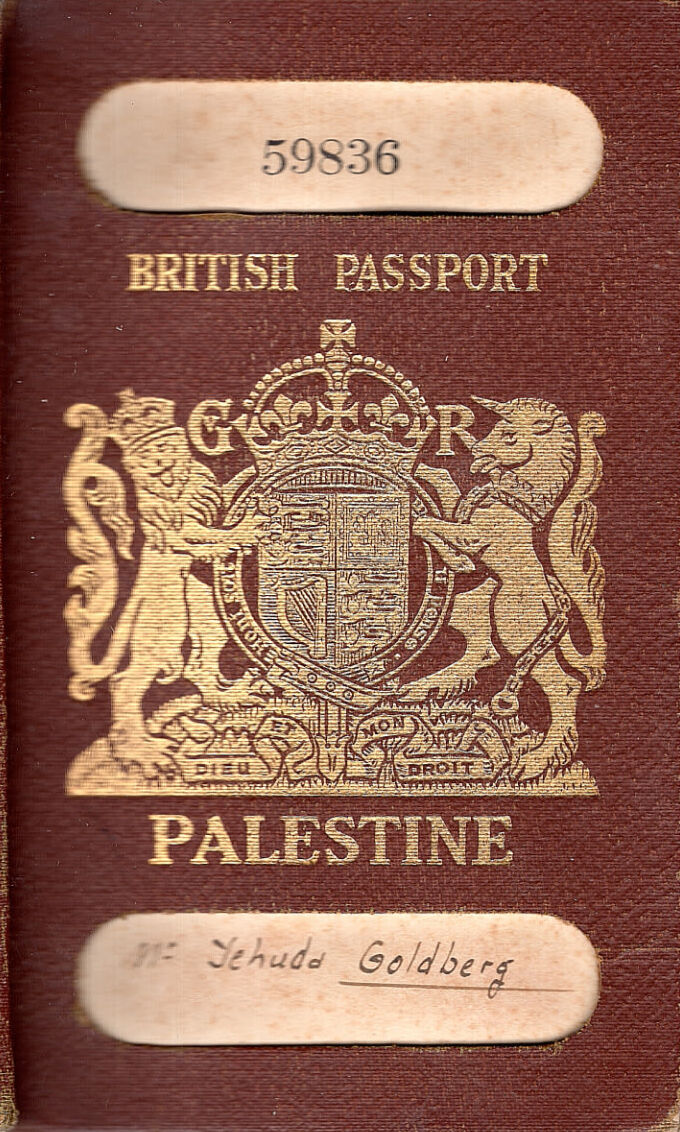
Mandatory Palestine passport, as issued by the British authorities between 1924 and 1948

Until now, Jordan has continued to issue passports to residents of the West Bank (subject to approval), but they are for travel purposes only and not as indication of citizenship. Palestinians in the West Bank who had regular Jordanian passports were issued with temporary ones upon expiration of the old ones, and entry into Jordan by Palestinians became time-limited and considered for tourism purposes only.

On 2 April 1995, two years after the Oslo Accords of 1993, the Palestinian National Authority started issuing Palestinian passports.

Starting March 2022, the Palestinian Ministry of Interior (responsible for issuing Palestinian passports) started issuing biometric passports. The passport contains a digitized photo, fingerprints and signature of the holder.

== Implications of the passport ==
Since 1997, Palestinian passports were not issued in the name of the State of Palestine. Some countries, including the United States, recognize Palestinian passports as acceptable travel documents, though the recognition of the passports does not imply recognition by them of citizenship, since they are not issued by a state which they recognize.

In 2016, President Mahmoud Abbas announced that a name change on Palestinian passports would be implemented, however this change has not yet been implemented as of 2026.

== Passport types ==
There are three types of Palestinian passports, and they are as follows:

- The diplomatic passport (Color: Red) It is granted to the political, economic, religious and security high leaders, in addition to members of the diplomatic corps and cases granted by the President of Palestine or the Prime Minister.
- The ordinary passport (Color: Black), which is the passport that is given to Palestinians living in the West Bank or Gaza Strip.
- Travel documents for Palestinian refugees are given to Palestinian refugees residing in Syria, Lebanon, Iraq, and Egypt who do not have Palestinian identity cards. Instead, they receive special documents issued by the country where they reside.

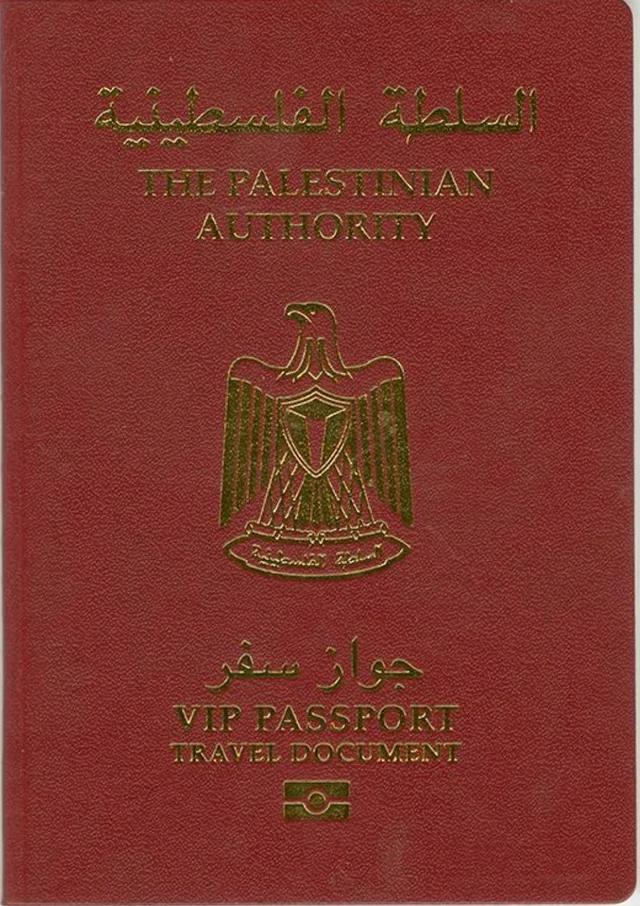
Diplomatic Palestinian passport

== Visa free entry ==
As of June 2024, the Palestinian passport allows entry to 53 countries and territories without a visa or by visa on arrival, ranking the Palestinian passport at 91st in terms of travel freedom according to the Henley Passport Index, which ties with both the Libyan and North Korean passport.

Visa requirements for Palestinian citizens Palestine Visa not required or Electronic Travel Authorisation Visa available both on arrival or online Visa on arrival eVisa Visa required prior to arrival or not established

== Passport note ==
The document contains a note on the second page (inside of the cover) stating:

=== English ===
THIS PASSPORT/TRAVEL DOCUMENT IS ISSUED PERSUANT [sic] TO THE PALESTINIAN SELF GOVERNMENT AGREEMENT ACCORDING TO OSLO AGREEMENT SIGNED IN WASHINGTON ON 13/9/1993.
IT IS REQUIRED FROM THOSE WHOM IT MIGHT CONCERN TO ALLOW THE BEARER OF THIS PASSPORT/TRAVEL DOCUMENT TO PASS FREELY WITHOUT LET AND HINDRANCE AND TO AFFORD HIM (HER) SUCH ASSISTANCE AND PROTECTION AS MAY BE NECESSARY.

== See also ==
- Palestinian Declaration of Independence
- Visa policy of Palestine
- Visa requirements for Palestinian citizens
