= Visa requirements for Palestinian citizens =

Administrative entry restrictions

Visa requirements for Palestinian citizens are administrative entry restrictions by the authorities of other states which are imposed on citizens of Palestine who hold a passport issued by the Palestinian Authority. As of 2026, Palestinian citizens had visa-free or visa on arrival access to 39 countries and territories, ranking the Palestinian passport 93rd in terms of travel freedom according to the Henley Passport Index and 89th per the Global Passport Power Rank.

As of 16 June 2023, the Palestinian Authority started issuing biometric passports, containing the same information as the previous non-biometric passport with the exception of the nationality which says PALESTINIAN/فلسطيني, and removed the occupation of the bearer (though this did not remove the occupation from the territory of the bearer).

Palestinian passport holders that have visas or residency permits issued by Australia, Canada, GCC courtiers, Schengen Area, United Kingdom, United States might help in granting them the ability to apply for electronic visa (e-Visa) and / or visa on arrival to some countries.

== Visa requirements map ==
Visa requirement for Palestinian citizens Palestine Visa not required or Electronic Travel Authorisation Visa available both on arrival or online Visa on arrival eVisa Visa required prior to arrival or not established

== Visa requirements ==
Country	Visa requirement	Allowed stay	Notes (excluding departure fees)
Afghanistan	eVisa	30 days	Visa is not required in case born in Afghanistan or can proof that one of their parents is a national of Afghanistan or born in Afghanistan.; e-Visa : Visitors must arrive at Kabul International (KBL).
Albania	eVisa		Visa is not required for Holders of a valid multiple-entry Schengen, UK or US visa has been previously used once or residence permit of Ireland, Schengen, UK, US or UAE 10 years.
Algeria	Visa required		Visa Issuance for passengers with a boarding authorization traveling as tourists to cities in the south of Algeria (Timimoun, Ghardaia, Ilizi, Djanet or Tamanraset) can obtain a visa on arrival for a maximum of 30 days. They must have: a return/onward ticket, a hotel reservation confirmation.
Andorra	Visa required		Although no visa requirements exist, apply the relevant regulations of France or Spain, whichever must be transited to reach Andorra.
Angola	eVisa		
Antigua and Barbuda	eVisa		Palestinians with a visa or residency issued by Canada, USA, United Kingdom or a Schengen Member State can obtain a visa upon arrival that costs USD100 for a maximum of 30 days.
Argentina	Visa required		
Armenia	Visa required		Palestinians with ordinary passports are required to hold a visa when travelling to Armenia.; The visa must be obtained in advance at the Embassies (Consulates) of Armenia by invitation only.; Invitations can be submitted to the Ministry of Foreign Affairs by: 1. a legal entity registered in Armenia, 2. authorities of Armenia and foreign diplomatic representations, international organizations or their representatives accredited in Armenia.; Individuals must submit an invitation to the Migration and Citizenship Service of the Ministry of Internal Affairs of Armenia.; The invitation must be submitted by a person or legal entity interested in the applicant’s visit to Armenia.; Temporary Visa Exemption for 180 days to Palestinians holding a valid residence permit issued by the USA, UK, European Union Member States, Schengen Area States and the GCC member state which supposed to be valid for at least six months from the date of entry into the Republic of Armenia, are exempt from the visa requirement starting from July1st ,2026 till July1st, 2027.
Australia	Online Visa required		May apply online (Online Visitor e600 visa).
Austria	Visa required		
Azerbaijan	Visa required		Palestinians are eligible to obtain a 30-day tourist Visa on Arrival if holding a residence permit issued by one of GCC state members. They must present their valid visa or residence permit along with their passport.
Bahamas	eVisa	90 days	
Bahrain	eVisa	14 days	For tourism purpose only.; May obtain a 1 month Visa on Arrival if holding a residence permit issued by United States -(Green card holders) or one of GCC state members and if holding a visa issued by Saudi Arabia, USA, United Arab Emirates, United Kingdom or a Schengen Member State.
Bangladesh	Visa on arrival	30 days	
Barbados	Visa required		Visa is not required for a maximum stay of 24 hours if holding a cruise reservation confirmation.
Belarus	Visa required		Visa upon arrival at Minsk International Airport (MSQ) if having an invitation letter issued by a Belarusian tourist company or a medical/health organization.; Palestinians with a valid visa issued by The Russian Federation can enter Belarus visa free but the visa must be valid for the period of intended stay in Belarus.
Belgium	Visa required		
Belize	Visa required		Visa is not required for holders of a valid multiple-entry visa or permanent residence of Canada, Schengen or US.
Benin	eVisa	30 days	Must have an international vaccination certificate.
Bhutan	eVisa	90 days	Visa fee is USD 40 per person and visa application may be processed within 5 business days with duration of stay of 90 days.; e-Visa applicant is also subject to pay Sustainable Development Fee
Bolivia	Visa not required	90 days	
Bosnia and Herzegovina	Visa required		Visa isn't required with duration of stay of 30 days for holders of a valid multiple-entry visa issued by US, Ireland or a Schengen Member State.
Botswana	eVisa	3 months	
Brazil	Visa required		
Brunei	Visa required		
Bulgaria	Visa required		Visa is not required for holders of a valid Schengen Member State Visa.
Burkina Faso	eVisa		
Burundi	eVisa /Visa on arrival	30 days	Must hold an Entry Authorisation letter issued by the authorities of Burundi beforehand.
Cambodia	eVisa / Visa on arrival	30 days	
Cameroon	eVisa		
Canada	Visa required		US permanent resident card (Green card) holders can enter visa free
Cape Verde	EASE	30 days	As of Jan 1st 2026 its a must to register online before arrival; Also pay the airport security fee of CVE 3400 online.
Central African Republic	Visa required		
Chad	eVisa	90 days	
Chile	Visa required		May apply online; Palestinians with an entry authorization issued by the Ministry of Foreign Affairs of Chile can obtain a visa upon arrival.
China	Visa required		Visa on arrival for Macao.; May get a visa on arrival for 5 days at Shenzhen(SZX) airport.; May apply online forHong Kong .; Palestinians who travel in a group organized by a Chinese international tour operator or a registered travel agency do not need a visa for a maximum of 6 days if they arrive from Hong Kong or Macao to take a trip to the Zhujiang Delta in Guangdong province; and arrive at/depart from Dongguan (DGM), Guangzhou (CAN), Huizhou (HUZ), Shantou (SWA), Shenzhen (SZX) or Zhuhai (ZUH).; Might transit without a visa if holding an onward ticket for a flight within 24 hours through any international airports of China (except Ürümqi). (Note: Custom procedure for 24-hour visa-free transit is required in principle, except in Beijing (both Capital and Daxing), Shanghai Pudong, Hangzhou, Xiamen, Guangzhou, Shenzhen, Chengdu Tianfu and Xi'an if no leaving of international transit areas.); eligible to obtain a visa upon arrival at Shanghai Pudong (PVG) or Shanghai Hongqiao (SHA) if holding a Port eVisa Confirmation Letter issued by China.; May apply online
Colombia	eVisa		
Comoros	Visa on arrival	45 days	
Republic of the Congo	Visa required		
Democratic Republic of the Congo	eVisa	7 days	
Costa Rica	Visa required		Holders of a valid multiple-entry visa of any member state of the Schengen Area, Canada, or the United States may enter Cost Rica without a visa for maximum stay of 30 days.
Côte d'Ivoire	eVisa	3 months	e-Visa holders must arrive via Port Bouet Airport.
Croatia	Visa required		
Cuba	eVisa	90 days	May purchase Tourist Card prior on arrival if having valid multiple entries visas issued by United States, Canada, or Schengen Member State.
Cyprus	Visa required		Holders of valid double or multiple entry Schengen visa or Bulgarian, Croatian and Romanian national visa, as well as residence permits issued by Schengen Member States or by Bulgaria, Croatia and Romania, are not required to hold a short-stay visa to enter the Republic of Cyprus for a time period that does not exceed 90 days in any 180 day period.
Czech Republic	Visa required		
Denmark	Visa required		
Djibouti	eVisa/Visa on arrival	90 days	
Dominica	Visa not required	21 days	Palestinians can enter with a visa issued by Canada, USA, United Kingdom or a Schengen Member State for a maximum of 6 months.; Palestinians with a confirmed onward ticket to a third country within 21 days or if they travel as a tourist do not need a visa.
Dominican Republic	Visa required		Holders of a valid visa or a residence permit of any member state of the Schengen Area, Canada, Cyprus, Ireland, the United Kingdom or the United States may enter the Dominican Republic without a visa.; travelers who wants to enter must submit an E-Ticket when enter/exit and present the QR code at immigration.
Ecuador	Visa not required	90 days	
Egypt	Visa required	30 days	Visa Exemptions: Female passengers with "The Palestinian Authority" normal passport.; Male passengers with "The Palestinian Authority" normal passport older than 40 years for a maximum stay of 30 days.; Male passengers with "The Palestinian Authority" normal passport: Requirement: for those transiting to the Gaza Strip, if the accepting carrier obtains confirmation that the Rafah border is open, prior to boarding; Requirement: for holders of an official invitation issued to participants of international and regional conferences; Requirement: for holders of Investment Authority approvals for those traveling on business, related to companies or projects in Egypt; Wives of Egyptian nationals.; Sons and daughters born to an Egyptian father.; Sons and daughters of an Egyptian mother if born after 25 July 2004.; Information: Accepted proof of Egyptian nationality is: (copy of) a birth certificate, passport or national ID card of the relative.
El Salvador	eVisa		
Equatorial Guinea	eVisa		
Eritrea	Visa required		
Estonia	Visa required		
Eswatini	Visa not required	30 days	
Ethiopia	eVisa	up to 90 days	e-Visa holders must arrive via Addis Ababa Bole International Airport.
Fiji	eVisa		
Finland	Visa required		
France	Visa required		
Gabon	eVisa	90 days	Electronic visa holders must arrive via Libreville International Airport.; New digital platform for issuing electronic tourist visas (e-Visas) in less than 48 hours, free of charge, for all applications submitted between July 1 and September 30, 2025.
Gambia	Visa required		
Georgia	Visa required		Visa is not required for up to 90 days if holding a valid visa or residency permit from EEA Member State, Australia, Bermuda, Canada, GCC member state, Japan, Korea (Rep.), New Zealand, Switzerland, USA or United Kingdom.
Germany	Visa required		
Ghana	eVisa		Visa applications to be processed within 5 working days.
Greece	Visa required		
Grenada	Visa required		Visa is not required up to 24 hours if traveling as a Cruise ship passenger.
Guatemala	Visa required		
Guinea	eVisa	90 days	
Guinea-Bissau	Visa on arrival	90 days	
Guyana	eVisa	90 days	Palestinians traveling as tourists with an approval letter issued by Ministry of Home Affairs (Immigration Section) of Guyana can obtain a visa on arrival for a maximum stay of 30 days.
Haiti	Visa not required	3 months	
Honduras	Visa required		
Hungary	Visa required		
Iceland	Visa required		
India	eVisa	30 days	e-Visa holders must arrive via 32 designated airports (Note: Ahmedabad; Amritsar; Bagdogra; Bengaluru; Bhubaneswar; Chandigarh; Chennai; Coimbatore; Delhi; Gaya; Goa-Dabolim; Goa-Manohar; Guwahati; Hyderabad; Indore; Jaipur; Kannur; Kochi; Kolkata; Kozhikode; Lucknow; Madurai; Mangaluru; Mumbai; Nagpur; Port Blair; Pune; Surat; Thiruvananthapuram; Tiruchirappalli; Varanasi; Visakhapatnam) or 5 designated seaports. (Note: Chennai; Cochin; Mormugao (Goa); Mumbai; Mangalore); An Indian e-Tourist Visa may only be obtained twice within 1 calendar year.; Foreigners of Pakistani origin or who hold a Pakistani Passport are not eligible for an e-Visa. Foreigners who are not Pakistani nationals, but whose parents or grandparents (either paternal or maternal) were born in, or were permanent residents in Pakistan, are also not eligible for an e-Visa.
Indonesia	e-VOA/Visa on arrival	30 days	Non-extendable.
Iran	eVisa /Visa on arrival	30 days	Arriving at Kish (KIH) or Qeshm (GSM) do not need a visa for a maximum of 14 days.; Can obtain a visa on arrival at Mashhad International Airport (MHD), Tabriz International Airport (TBZ), Esfahan International Airport (IFN) and Bandar Abbas International Airport (BND) for a maximum of 30 days.; Passengers who have already made an application, at least two days before arrival, at the Iranian Ministry of Foreign Affair's e-Visa website and present the submission notification at the airport's visa desk may obtain a visa on arrival.
Iraq	eVisa	30 days	May apply online Kurdistan region.
Ireland	Visa required		May apply online through AVATS Online Application facility
Israel	Visa required		Holders of passports issued by the Palestinian Authority can obtain only a one time exit "permit" from Israel that allows them to exit and return to Tel Aviv Airport. Other arrivals are deported to last airport of departure on their own cost. Palestinians are denied from returning to Palestine.; Palestinians holding a BMC - Business Men Card, previously known as VIP card, are allowed to exit and return to Tel Aviv Airport upon previous coordination with COGAT.; Authorizations of Entry into Israel, their Passage between West Bank and the Gaza Strip and their Travel Abroad; See Palestinian freedom of movement.
Italy	Visa required		
Jamaica	Visa required		Palestinians with a cruise reservation confirmation are visa exempted for a maximum stay of 72 hours.
Japan	Visa required		Eligible for an e-Visa if residing in one these countries Australia, Brazil, Cambodia, Canada, India, Saudi Arabia, Singapore, South Africa, Taiwan, United Arab Emirates, United Kingdom, United States.; May apply online
Jordan	Visa not required	30 days	1 month holders of normal passport issued for residents of West Bank.; This does not apply to passengers whose passport ID starts with 00.; Residents of the Gaza Strip must obtain a “non-impediment” permit from the Jordanian government beforehand to enter Jordan, and obtain a 'special transit visa' when transiting.
Kazakhstan	eVisa		
Kenya	Electronic Travel Authorisation	3 months	Electronic Travel Authorisation (eTA); Applications can be submitted up to 90 days prior to travel and must be submitted at least 3 days in advance.; eTA fee is 32.50 USD.; Proof of reservation at the hotel where visitors plan to stay is required (if staying with friends, an invitation letter is also acceptable).; Yellow fever vaccination certificate is required if coming from endemic countries.; Can also be entered on an East Africa tourist visa issued by Rwanda or Uganda.
Kiribati	Visa required		
North Korea	Visa required		
South Korea	Visa required		Multiple-Entry Visa may be granted to Palestinians who entered South Korea 4 or more times within the last 2 years, or 10 or more visits in total (one of those 10 visits should be within the last 2 years).; May apply online
Kuwait	Visa required		e-Visa can be obtained for holders of a Residence Permit issued by a GCC member state under the following conditions: To be 18 years old and over.; The residence permit for a GCC state must be valid for at least another 3 months.; To be accompanied by the sponsor of the residence permit if the sponsor is an individual.; Does not apply to holders of a GCC Student Visa and Non-Skilled Worker Visa
Kyrgyzstan	eVisa		
Laos	Visa on arrival	30 days	18 (Note: Savannakhet Airport; Lanetoui - Mengkang (China); Meuangmom - Wan Pong (Myanmar); Banvang - Ban Khok Phai (Thailand); Namngeun - Huay Kon (Thailand); Paksan - Bueng Kan (Thailand); Paktaphan - Pak Saeng (Thailand); Pangmon - Ban Huak (Thailand); Phoudou (Thailand); Dak ta ock - Nam Giang (Vietnam); La Lai (Vietnam); Namkan (Vietnam); Namphao - Cau Treo (Vietnam); Namsoy - Na Meo (Vietnam); Naphao - Cha Lo (Vietnam); Pahang - Long Sap (Vietnam); Panghok - Tây Trang (Vietnam); Phoukeua - Bo Y (Vietnam)) of the 33 border crossings are only open to regular visa holders.; e-Visa may be used to enter Laos through the Luang Prabang, Pakse and Vientiane international airports, 3 Thai-Lao Friendship Bridges (Note: Vientiane (Friendship Bridge 1); Savannakhet (Friendship Bridge 2); Bokeo (Friendship Bridge 4)), in Boten (road and railroad), and in Vientiane (at Khamsavath railway station).; Visa on arrival is available at the Luang Prabang, Pakse and Vientiane international airports, 4 Thai-Lao Friendship Bridges (Note: Vientiane (Friendship Bridge 1); Savannakhet (Friendship Bridge 2); Khammouane (Friendship Bridge 3); Bokeo (Friendship Bridge 4)) and 7 border crossings. (Note: Nongnokkheane - Trapeang Kriel (Cambodia); Boten - Bo han (China); Golden Triangle/Samliemkham (Thailand); Khamsavath railway station (Thailand); Namheuang - Ban Na Kraseng (Thailand); Vang tao - Chongmek (Thailand); Dansavan - Lao Bảo (Vietnam))
Latvia	Visa required		
Lebanon	Visa required		Holders of passports containing any Israeli visa or stamp will be refused entry.
Lesotho	eVisa	14 days	eVISA Applications System Suspended. Email for online applications.
Liberia	eVisa	30 days	Must apply online for the visa on arrival.; May Apply online
Libya	eVisa	30 days	
Liechtenstein	Visa required		
Lithuania	Visa required		
Luxembourg	Visa required		
Madagascar	Admission refused		Although Palestinians can apply online for the eVisa at the platform but holders of a Palestinian Authority passport are not allowed to enter and transit.
Malawi	eVisa		
Malaysia	Visa not required	30 days	The electronic Malaysia Digital Arrival Card must be submitted within three days before the date of arrival in Malaysia.
Maldives	Free visa on arrival	30 days	
Mali	Visa required		
Malta	Visa required		
Marshall Islands	Visa required		
Mauritania	eVisa	30 days	
Mauritius	Visa required		
Mexico	Visa required		Visa is not required for Holders of a valid visa of Canada, US, UK or a Schengen State and Permanent residence of Canada, Chile, Colombia, Schengen State, Japan, UK, US; Entry may be refused by immigration officials for individuals who were previously denied a US visa, even if holding a valid Mexican visa.
Micronesia	Visa not required	30 days	
Moldova	eVisa		visa not required if holding a valid visa /residence permit that is issued by a European Union member state or Schengen Area, Canada, Ireland, UK, US
Monaco	Visa required		
Mongolia	eVisa		May obtain a visa on arrival at Ulaanbaatar (ULN) if traveling on business or on duty with a confirmation from Immigration Agency of Mongolia or Consular Department of the Ministry of Foreign Affairs of Mongolia stating that a visa has been approved before departure.
Montenegro	Visa required		Visa not required for holders of a valid Australia, Japan, Canada, New Zealand, Ireland, US, UK or a Schengen Visa.; Holders of residence permit in the United Arab Emirates may enter, in Montenegro for a duration of 10 days
Morocco	Visa required		
Mozambique	eVisa / Visa on arrival	30 days	
Myanmar	Visa required		
Namibia	eVOA		
Nauru	Visa required		Applications can be submitted via email before departure
Nepal	Visa required	30 days	Palestinians are required to acquire a Visa prior their arrival from their nearby Diplomatic missions (Embassies/consulates) of Nepal Government.
Netherlands	Visa required		
New Zealand	Visa required		Egyptian travel documents issued for Palestinian refugees that do not include an entry visa allowing the holder to enter Egypt are unacceptable, and visas will not be endorsed in them.; Holders of an Australian Permanent Resident Visa or Resident Return Visa may be granted a New Zealand Resident Visa on arrival permitting indefinite stay (pursuant to the Trans-Tasman Travel Arrangement), subject to meeting character requirements and obtaining an Electronic Travel Authority prior to departure.
Nicaragua	Visa not required	90 days	
Niger	Visa required		Visa on arrival at Diori Hamani International Airport if a letter of invitation ('Visa Volant') issued by the Ministry of Interior is honored.
Nigeria	eVisa	90 days	
North Macedonia	Visa required		Visa is not required for stays upto 15 days if holding a valid multiple entry visa of Canada, the United States, United Kingdom, Schengen Area member state, or residence permit of Schengen Area member state.
Norway	Visa required		
Oman	eVisa	10 days	Holders of a GCC state resident permit can get a 28 days visa on arrival that costs 5 Omani Riyals.
Pakistan	eVisa	90 days	Palestinians must register their personal information and temporary address in the nearest police station within 1 week after entering Pakistan. This is usually done by the sponsor (in case of a Visit Visa or Business Visa), or by the hotel management (in case of a Tourist Visa).
Palau	Free visa on arrival	30 days	
Panama	Visa required		Visa is not required for holders of a multiple-entry visa valid for at least 6 months at the time of entry or permanent residency issued by Australia, Canada, European Union, Japan, Singapore, South Korea, US, UK.
Papua New Guinea	eVisa	60 days	May apply for an e-visa under the type of "Tourist - Own Itinerary".
Paraguay	eVisa		
Peru	Visa required		
Philippines	eVisa		Only applicable to residents of the United Arab Emirates who hold valid Emirati residence visas.
Poland	Visa required		
Portugal	Visa required		
Qatar	eVisa	30 days	
Romania	Visa required		Visa is not required for holders of a valid Schengen Member State Visa.; May Apply Online.
Russia	Visa required		May enter with a valid visa issued by Belarus which must be valid for the period of intended stay in Russia.; Visa not required if visiting Saint Petersburg for up to 72 hours via the cruise St. Peter Line ferries, from Helsinki or Tallinn.; May apply online and then submit all the documents at the embassy to get the visa
Rwanda	eVisa / Visa on arrival		Can also be entered on an East Africa tourist visa issued by Kenya or Uganda
Saint Kitts and Nevis	eVisa		
Saint Lucia	Visa required		
Saint Vincent and the Grenadines	Visa required		
Samoa	Free entry permit on arrival	90 days	
San Marino	Visa required		
São Tomé and Príncipe	eVisa	15 days	Holders of a visa or resident permit issued by the United States or a Schengen area member state do not require a visa for stays up to 15 days.
Saudi Arabia	Visa required		Tourist visa on arrival and eVisa for holders of a valid multiple entry visa from US, UK or Schengen area, under the condition that the multiple entry visa has been used at least once, proving that by showing the entry and exit stamps of the country of issuance.; Eligible for an e-Visa or transit visa if holding a valid residence permit of no less than 3 months in a GCC country.
Senegal	Visa on arrival	90 days	
Serbia	eVisa		Visa isn't required for holders of a valid visa issued by Switzerland, United Kingdom, USA or an EEA Member State or a residence permit issued by Switzerland, USA or an EEA Member State for a maximum of 90 days .
Seychelles	Electronic Border System	3 months	Application submitted up to 30 days before travel
Sierra Leone	eVisa	30 days	
Singapore	eVisa	30 days	
Slovakia	Visa required		
Slovenia	Visa required		May apply online and then submit the printed application at Slovenian Embassy/consulate
Solomon Islands	eVisa		Holding an onward ticket to a 3rd destination makes it possible to get a transit visa upon arrival for a period of 7 days.
Somalia	eVisa	30 days	
South Africa	ETA	90 days	South Africa’s ETA portal is now accessible, but not yet functional.; Countries exempt from South African Visas.
South Sudan	eVisa		Obtainable online; Printed visa authorization must be presented at the time of travel
Spain	Visa required		
Sri Lanka	Electronic Travel Authorization	30 days	Sri Lanka introduced an ETA valid for 30 days.
Sudan	Visa required		May obtain a visa on arrival if married to a national of Sudan or prove that are of Sudanese origins from the father's side.
Suriname	Visa not required	90 days	
Sweden	Visa required		
Switzerland	Visa required		
Syria	eVisa		Palestinians whose their Palestinian Authority Passport states that they were born in Algeria, Bahrain, Jordan, Kuwait, Lebanon, Mauritania, Morocco, Oman, Qatar, Saudi Arabia, Somalia, Sudan, Syria, Tunisia, United Arab Emirates or Yemen do not need a visa.; Nationals of countries without any Syrian representation can obtain a visa upon arrival, Palestinians with a residence permit issued by a GCC country state can obtain a visa upon arrival. They must have a valid address in Syria, a contact number and sufficient funds to cover their stay.
Taiwan	eVisa	90 days	
Tajikistan	eVisa	45 days	
Tanzania	eVisa	90 days	
Thailand	eVisa	30 days	Thailand launched digital arrival card(TDAC) for visitors starting from May st 2025 that could be filled up to 3 days before the arrival date.
Timor-Leste	Visa on arrival	30 days	At Presidente Nicolau Lobato International Airport or the Dili Sea Port only.
Togo	eVisa	15 days	
Tonga	Visa required		If intending to visit Tonga for a period of not less than 30 days its required to obtain an entry permit issued by the Immigration Department of the Ministry of Foreign Affairs prior to arriving in Tonga
Trinidad and Tobago	eVisa		
Tunisia	Visa required		Holders of a residence permit issued by GCC Member States can obtain a visa on arrival for 15 days. The permit should be valid for at least 6 months from date of arrival and must have a confirmed hotel reservation also sufficient money to cover the stay.
Turkey	eVisa	30 days	e-Visa can be obtained if holding a multiple entry visa or a residence permit from any of the Schengen countries, USA, UK or Ireland.
Turkmenistan	eVisa		Eligible for a visa on arrival for a maximum stay of 10 days if having a letter of invitation issued by a company registered in Turkmenistan and approved by the Ministry of Foreign Affairs
Tuvalu	Visa on arrival	1 month	
Uganda	eVisa	3 months	Visa fee is 50 USD.; Can also be entered on an East Africa Tourist Visa issued by Kenya or Rwanda.
Ukraine	Visa required		
United Arab Emirates	eVisa	30 days	May apply online.; May apply also using 'Smart service'.
United Kingdom	Visa required		May apply online
United States	Visa required		Multiple Entry visa is given for a duration of 5 years.; May apply online; As of Sep 1st, 2025, holders of Palestinian Passports for Non Immigrant Visa applications will be rejected
Uruguay	Visa required		
Uzbekistan	Visa required		
Vanuatu	eVisa	120 days	
Vatican City	Visa required		Open borders but de facto follows Italian visa policy.
Venezuela	Visa not required	90 days	
Vietnam	eVisa	90 days	Visa free for 30 days when visiting Phú Quốc
Yemen	Visa required		Yemen introduced an e-Visa system for visitors who meet certain eligibility requirements (group travel of 10 or more people, business trips, and transit etc.).
Zambia	eVisa	90 days	
Zimbabwe	eVisa / Visa on arrival	30 days	

== See also ==
- Visa policy of Palestine
- Palestinian passport
- International recognition of Palestine
