= Roman Gaul =

Gaul as a province of the Roman Empire

Roman Gaul refers to Gaul (Note: The territory of Gaul roughly corresponds to modern-day France, Belgium and Luxembourg, and adjacent parts of the Netherlands, Switzerland and Germany.) under provincial rule in the Roman Empire from the 1st century BC to the 5th century AD.

== History ==
=== During the Republic ===
The Roman Republic's influence began in southern Gaul. By the mid-2nd century BC, Rome was trading heavily with the Greek colony of Massilia (modern Marseille) and entered into an alliance with them, by which Rome agreed to protect the town from local Gauls, including the nearby Aquitani and from sea-borne Carthaginians and other rivals, in exchange for land that the Romans wanted in order to build a road to Hispania to improve troop movements to its provinces there. The Mediterranean settlements on the coast continued to be threatened by the powerful Gallic tribes to the north and in 122 BC the Roman general Gnaeus Domitius Ahenobarbus campaigned in the area and defeated the Allobroges followed by Quintus Fabius Maximus against the Arverni under King Bituitus in 121 BC.

The Romans respected and feared the Gallic tribes. In 390 BC, the Gauls had sacked Rome, which left an existential dread of barbarian conquest the Romans never forgot. In 109 BC, Italy had been invaded from the north and saved by Gaius Marius only after several bloody and costly battles. Around 62 BC, when a Roman client state, the Arverni, conspired with the Sequani and the Suebi nations east of the Rhine to attack the Aedui, a strong Roman ally, Rome turned a blind eye. The Sequani and the Arverni sought Ariovistus's aid and defeated the Aedui in 63 BC at the Battle of Magetobriga.

=== Gallic wars ===
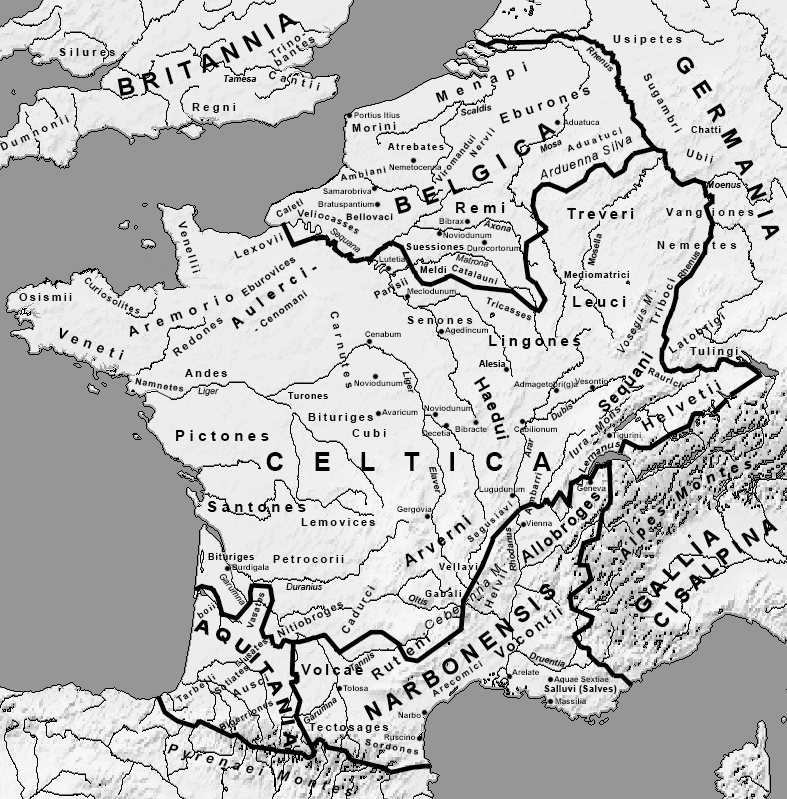
Gaul on the eve of the Gallic Wars (58 BC)

As 58 BC dawned, most of Gaul was still under independent rule. It was beginning to urbanize and shared many aspects of Roman civilization. Into this picture came the rising general Julius Caesar, who had ensured himself the position of Governor of both Transalpine and Cisalpine Gaul. He sought to pay off debts and glorify himself, and so began a series of aggressive campaigns to conquer the Gallic tribes.

The wars began with a conflict over the migration of the Helvetii in 58 BC, which drew in neighboring tribes and the Germanic Suebi. By 57 BC, Caesar had resolved to conquer all of Gaul, and led campaigns in the east, where the Nervii nearly defeated him. In 56 BC, Caesar defeated the Veneti in a naval battle and took most of northwest Gaul. In 55 BC, he sought to boost his public image, and undertook first of their kind expeditions across the Rhine river and the English Channel. Upon his return from Britain, Caesar was hailed as a hero, though he had achieved little beyond landing because his army had been too small. The next year, he went back with a proper army and invaded Britain. However, tribes rose up on the continent, and the Romans suffered a humiliating defeat. 53 BC saw a draconian campaign against the Gauls in an attempt to pacify them. This failed and the Gauls staged a mass revolt under the leadership of Vercingetorix in 52 BC. Gallic forces won a notable victory at the Battle of Gergovia, but the Romans' indomitable siege works at the Battle of Alesia utterly defeated the Gallic coalition.

In 51 BC and 50 BC, there was little resistance and Caesar's troops were mostly mopping up. Gaul was conquered, although it would not become a Roman province until 27 BC, and resistance would continue until as late as 70 AD. There is no clear end-date for the war, but the imminent Roman Civil War led to the withdrawal of Caesar's troops in 50 BC. Caesar's wild successes in the war had made him extremely wealthy and provided a legendary reputation. The Gallic Wars were a key factor in Caesar's ability to win the Civil War and declare himself dictator, in what would eventually lead to the end of the Roman Republic and the establishment of the Roman Empire.

=== Under the Empire ===
Principal ancient Roman roads

At the end of the Gallic Wars, the Gauls had not been entirely subjugated and were not yet a formal part of the Empire, but that task was not Caesar's and he left that to his successors. Gaul would not be made formally into Roman provinces until the reign of Augustus in 27 BC. Several rebellions happened subsequently and Roman troops were kept stationed throughout Gaul. There may have been unrest in the region as late as 70 AD.

Massilia was allied to Pompey during Caesar's civil war, which led to its eventual defeat at the Siege of Massilia in 49 BC after which it lost its territories but was allowed to keep nominal autonomy, due to ancient ties of friendship and support of Rome.

In 40 BC, during the Second Triumvirate, Lepidus was given responsibility for Gallia Narbonensis (along with Hispania and Africa), while Mark Antony was given the balance of Gaul.

In 22 BC, imperial administration of Gaul was reorganised establishing the provinces of Gallia Aquitania, Gallia Belgica and Gallia Lugdunensis. Parts of eastern Gaul were incorporated into the provinces Raetia (15 BC) and Germania Superior (AD 83).

Roman citizenship was granted to all in 212 by the Constitutio Antoniniana.

Several significant Roman figures were born in Gaul, including Roman Emperors Claudius, Caracalla and probably Carus, as well as the important general Gnaeus Julius Agricola. Another general born in Gaul was Marcus Antonius Primus. In addition, the family of Antoninus Pius, which was also the adoptive family of Marcus Aurelius, came from Roman Gaul. Among the Roman writers known or hypothesized to be born in Gaul there are Tacitus, Petronius, Varro Atacinus, Aemilius Magnus Arborius, Frontinus, Ausonius, Rutilius Claudius Namatianus, Sextus Pompeius Festus, Gnaeus Pompeius Trogus and the authors of the important Panegyrici latini. Many other writers were from the region of Cisalpine Gaul, which was part of Italy, including Virgil, Caecilius Statius, Catullus and Pliny the Elder.

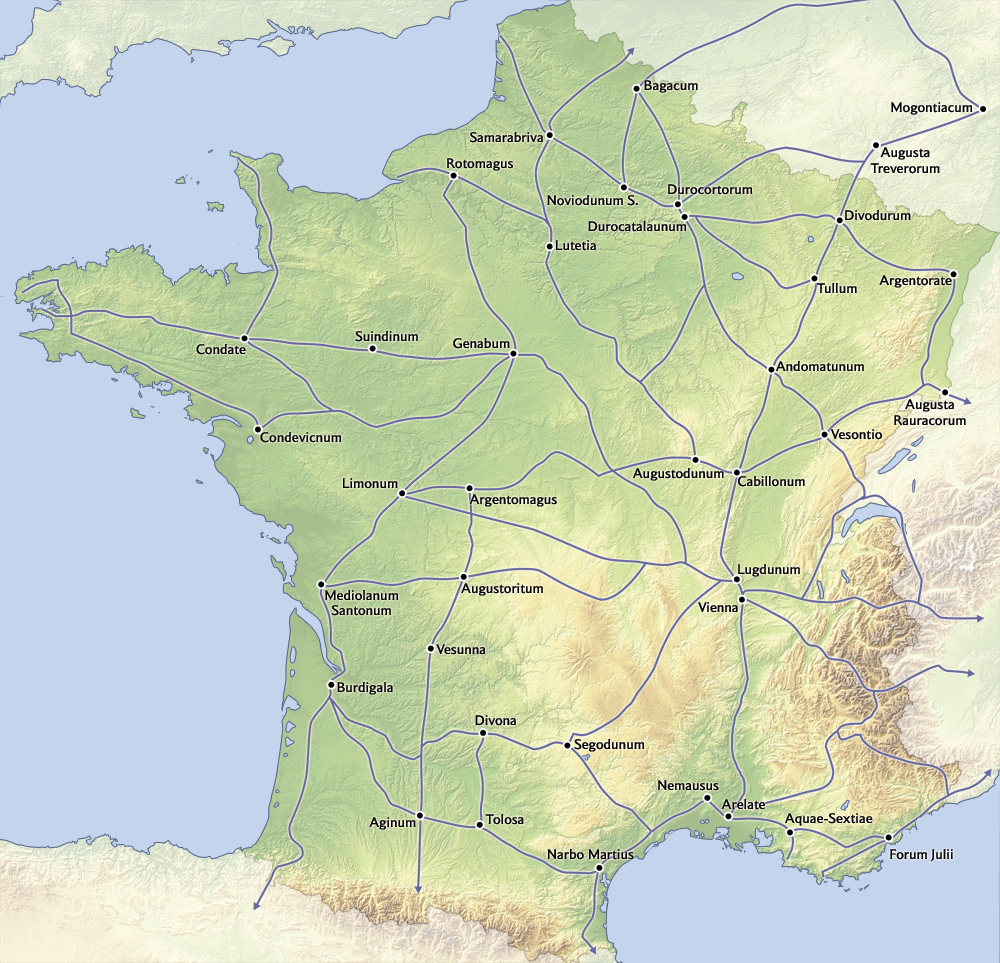
Major cities of Roman Gaul

In the Crisis of the Third Century around 260, Postumus established a short-lived Gallic Empire, which included the Iberian Peninsula and Britannia, in addition to Gaul itself. Germanic tribes, the Franks and the Alamanni, invaded Gaul at this time. The Gallic Empire ended with Emperor Aurelian's victory at Châlons in 274.

In 286–7 Carausius, commander of the Classis Britannica, the fleet of the English Channel, declared himself Emperor of Britain and northern Gaul. His forces comprised his fleet, the three legions stationed in Britain and also a legion he had seized in Gaul, a number of foreign auxiliary units, a levy of Gaulish merchant ships, and barbarian mercenaries attracted by the prospect of booty. In 293 emperor Constantius Chlorus isolated Carausius by besieging the port of Gesoriacum (Boulogne-sur-Mer) and invaded Batavia in the Rhine delta, held by his Frankish allies, and reclaimed Gaul.

A migration of Celts from Britain appeared in the 4th century in Armorica led by the legendary king Conan Meriadoc. They spoke the now extinct British language, which evolved into the Breton, Cornish, and Welsh languages.

The Goths, who had sacked Rome in 410, established a capital in Toulouse and in 418 succeeded in being accepted by Honorius as foederati and rulers of the Aquitanian province in exchange for their support against the Barbarian people in Spain.

The Roman Empire had difficulty responding to all the barbarian raids, and Flavius Aëtius had to use these tribes against each other in order to maintain some Roman control. He first used the Huns against the Burgundians, and these mercenaries destroyed Worms, killed king Gunther, and pushed the Burgundians westward. The Burgundians were resettled by Aëtius near Lugdunum in 443. The Huns, united by Attila, became a greater threat, and Aëtius used the Visigoths against the Huns. The conflict climaxed in 451 at the Battle of Châlons, in which the Romans and Goths defeated Attila.

== After the fall of the Western Roman Empire ==
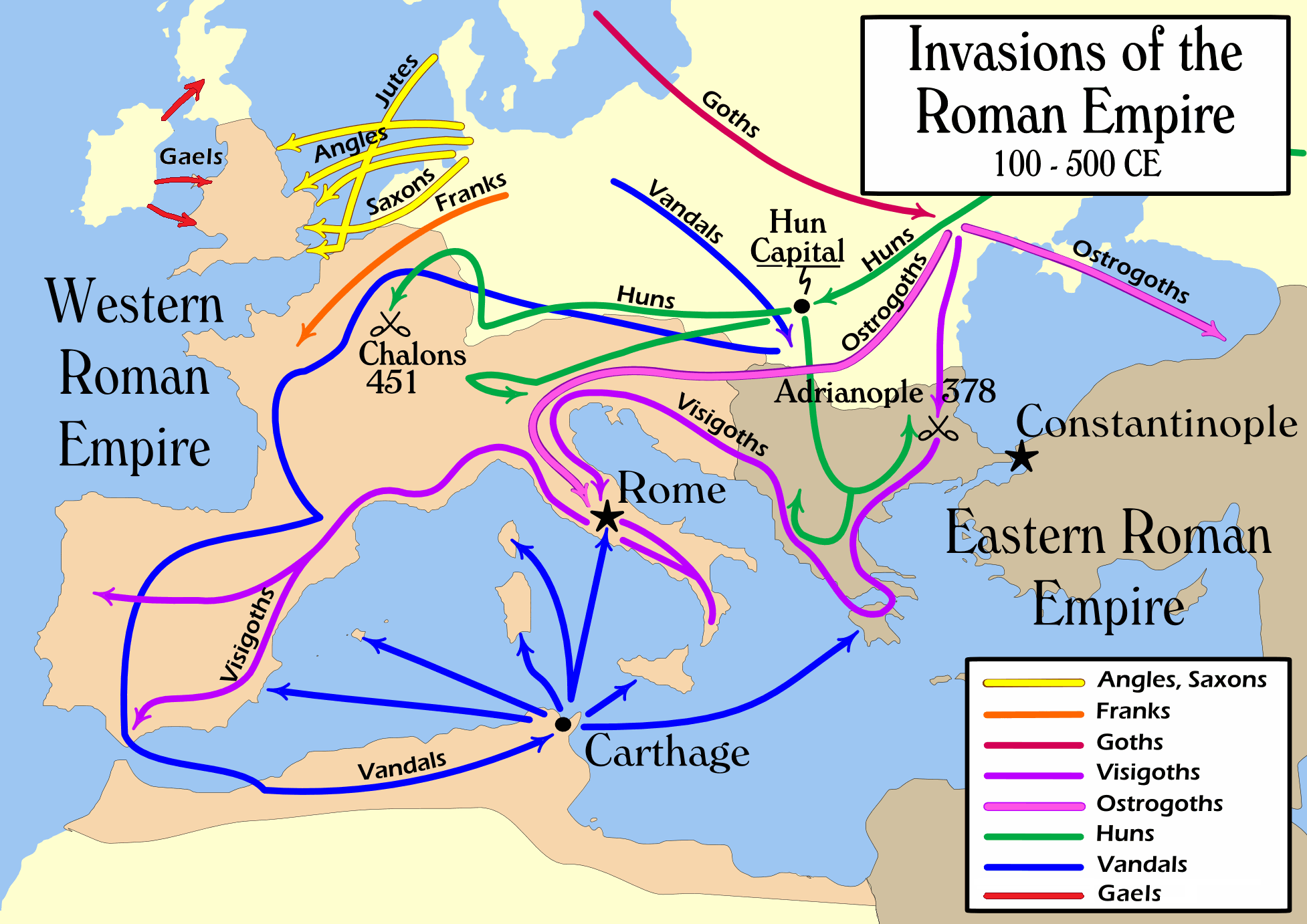
Invasions of the Roman Empire

The Western Roman administration finally collapsed as remaining Roman troops withdrew southeast to protect Italy. Between 455 and 476, the Visigoths, the Burgundians, and the Franks assumed control in Gaul. However, certain aspects of the ancient Celtic culture continued after the fall of Roman administration and the Domain of Soissons, a remnant of the Empire, survived from 457 to 486.

In 486, the Franks defeated the last Roman authority in Gaul in the Franco-Roman War by winning the Battle of Soissons. Almost immediately afterwards, most of Gaul came under the rule of the Merovingians, the first kings of a proto-France.

As a result of the lost Battle of Vouillé in the Franco-Visigothic War (507-511) the Visigoths were pushed out of most of Gaul by the Frankish king Clovis I. They were able to retain Narbonensis and Provence after the timely arrival of an Ostrogoth detachment sent by Theodoric the Great.

Certain Gallo-Roman aristocratic families continued to exert power in episcopal cities (such as the Mauronitus family in Marseille and Bishop Gregory of Tours). The appearance of Germanic given and family names becomes noticeable in Gallia/Francia from the middle of the 7th century on, most notably in powerful families, indicating that the centre of gravity had definitely shifted.

The Gallo-Roman (or Vulgar Latin) dialect of the late Roman period evolved into the dialects of the Oïl languages and Old French in the north, and into Occitan in the south.

The name Gallia and its equivalents continued in use, at least in writing, until the end of the Merovingian period in the 750s. Slowly, during the ensuing Carolingian period (751–987), the expression Francia, then Francia occidentalis spread to describe the political reality of the kingdom of the Franks (regnum francorum).

== Geographical divisions ==
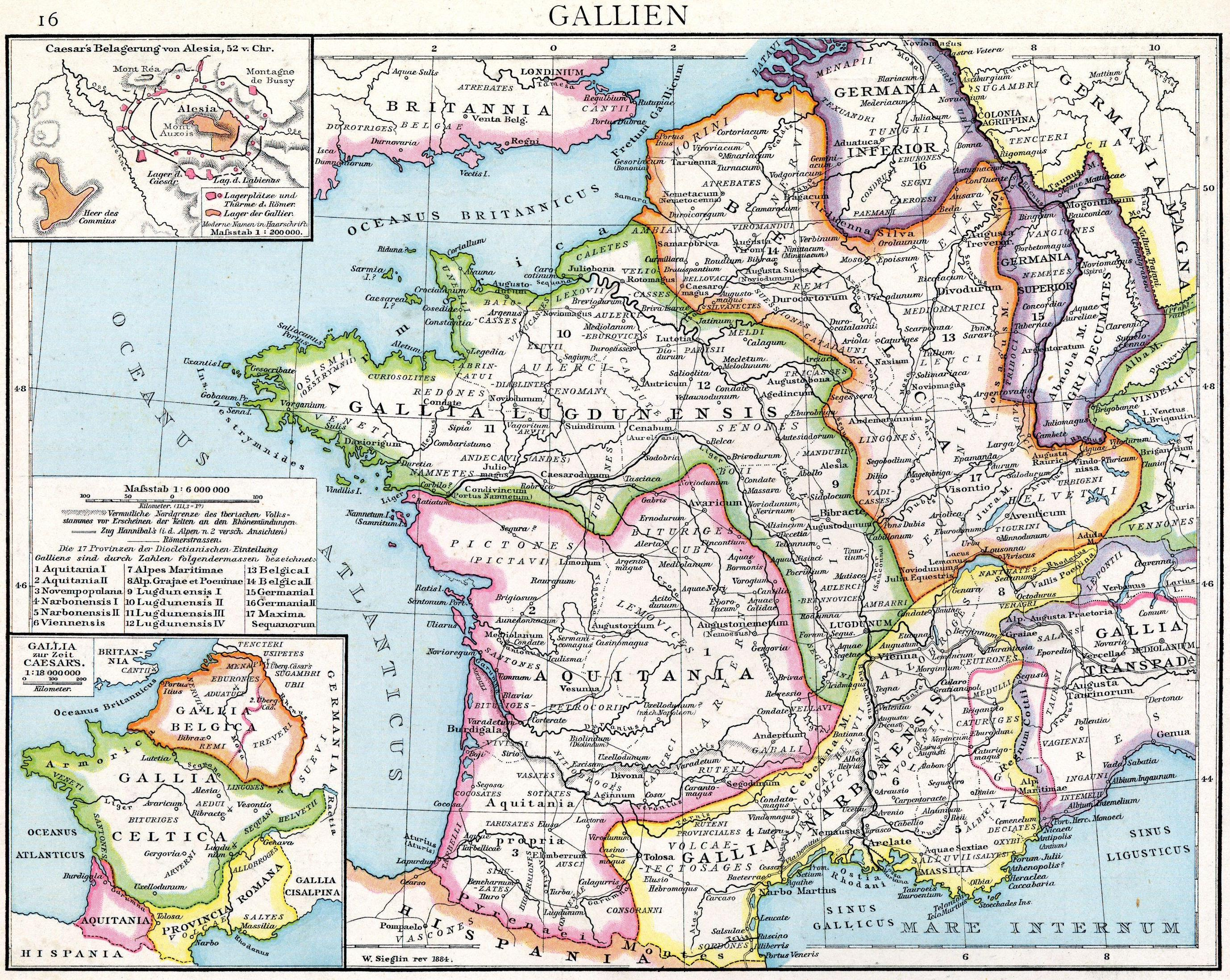
Roman Gaul after Diocletian's reorganisation (1886 atlas)

Before 22 BC, Gaul had three geographical divisions, one of which was divided into multiple Roman provinces:

1. Gallia Cisalpina or "Gaul this side of the Alps", covered most of present-day northern Italy. It was conquered by the Romans around 121 BC, but was not made a formal province until 81 BC. By the end of the republic, it was annexed into Italy itself.
2. Gallia Transalpina, or "Gaul across the Alps", was originally conquered and annexed in 121 BC in an attempt to solidify communications between Rome and the Iberian peninsula. It comprised most of what is now southern France, along the Mediterranean coast from the Pyrenees to the Alps. It was later renamed Gallia Narbonensis, after its capital city, Narbo (modern Narbonne).
3. Gallia Comata, "free Gaul" or "long-haired Gaul", encompassed the remainder of present-day France, Belgium, and westernmost Germany, including Aquitania, Gallia Celtica and Belgica. It had tributary status throughout the second and first centuries BC, but was still formally independent of Rome. It was annexed into the Empire as a result of Julius Caesar's victory in the Gallic Wars in 50 BC.

After 22 BC, the Romans divided Gallia Comata into three provinces, the Tres Galliae (the 3 Gauls):

Gallia Aquitania, corresponding to central and western France;
Gallia Belgica, corresponding to northeastern France, Belgium, Luxembourg, and western Germany; capital at Reims, later Trier
Gallia Lugdunensis, corresponding to eastern and northern France; capital at Lugdunum (Lyon)

The Romans divided these huge provinces into civitates corresponding more or less with the pre-Conquest communities or polities sometimes described misleadingly as "tribes," such as the Aedui, Allobroges, Bellovaci, and Sequani (see List of Celtic tribes) but the civitates were too large and in turn were divided into smaller units, pagi, a term that eventually became the modern French word "pays". These administrative groupings would be taken over by the Romans in their system of local control, and these civitates would also be the basis of France's eventual division into ecclesiastical bishoprics and dioceses, which would remain in place—with slight changes—until the French Revolution.

== Language and culture ==
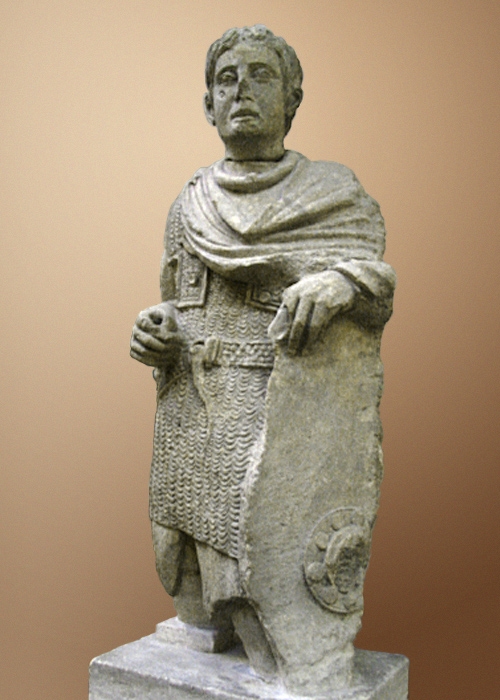
The Vachères warrior, 1st century BC, a statue depicting a Romanized Gaulish warrior wearing chainmail and a Celtic torc around his neck, wielding a Celtic-style shield.

In the five centuries between Caesar's invasion and the collapse of the Western Roman Empire, the Gaulish language and cultural identity underwent a syncretism with the Roman culture of the new governing class, and evolved into a hybrid Gallo-Roman culture that eventually permeated all levels of society. Gauls continued writing some inscriptions in the Gaulish language, but switched from the Greek alphabet to the Latin alphabet during the Roman period. Current historical research suggests that Roman Gaul was "Roman" only in certain (albeit major) social contexts, the prominence of which in material culture has hindered a better historical understanding of the permanence of many Celtic elements. The Roman influence was most apparent in the areas of civic religion and administration. The Druidic religion was suppressed by Emperor Claudius I, and in later centuries Christianity was introduced. The prohibition of Druids and the syncretic nature of the Roman religion led to disappearance of the Celtic religion. It remains to this day poorly understood: current knowledge of the Celtic religion is based on archaeology and via literary sources from several isolated areas such as Ireland and Wales.

The Romans easily imposed their administrative, economic, artistic (especially in terms of monumental art and architecture) and literary culture. They wore the Roman tunic instead of their traditional clothing. Surviving Celtic influences also infiltrated back into the Roman Imperial culture in the 3rd century. For example, the Gaulish tunic—which gave Emperor Caracalla his surname—had not been replaced by Roman fashion. Similarly, certain Gaulish artisan techniques, such as the barrel (more durable than the Roman amphora) and chain mail were adopted by the Romans.

The Celtic heritage also continued in the spoken language (see History of French). Gaulish spelling and pronunciation of Latin are apparent in several 5th century poets and transcribers of popular farces. The last pockets of Gaulish speakers appear to have lingered until the 6th or 7th century. Gaulish was held to be attested by a quote from Gregory of Tours written in the second half of the 6th century, which describes how a shrine "called 'Vasso Galatae' in the Gallic tongue" was destroyed and burnt to the ground. Throughout the Roman rule over Gaul, although considerable Romanization in terms of material culture occurred, the Gaulish language is held to have survived and continued to be spoken, coexisting with Latin.

Germanic placenames were first attested in border areas settled by Germanic colonizers (with Roman approval). In the 4th and 5th centuries, the Franks settled in northern France and Belgium, the Alemanni in Alsace and Switzerland, and the Burgundians in Savoie.

=== Gallery ===
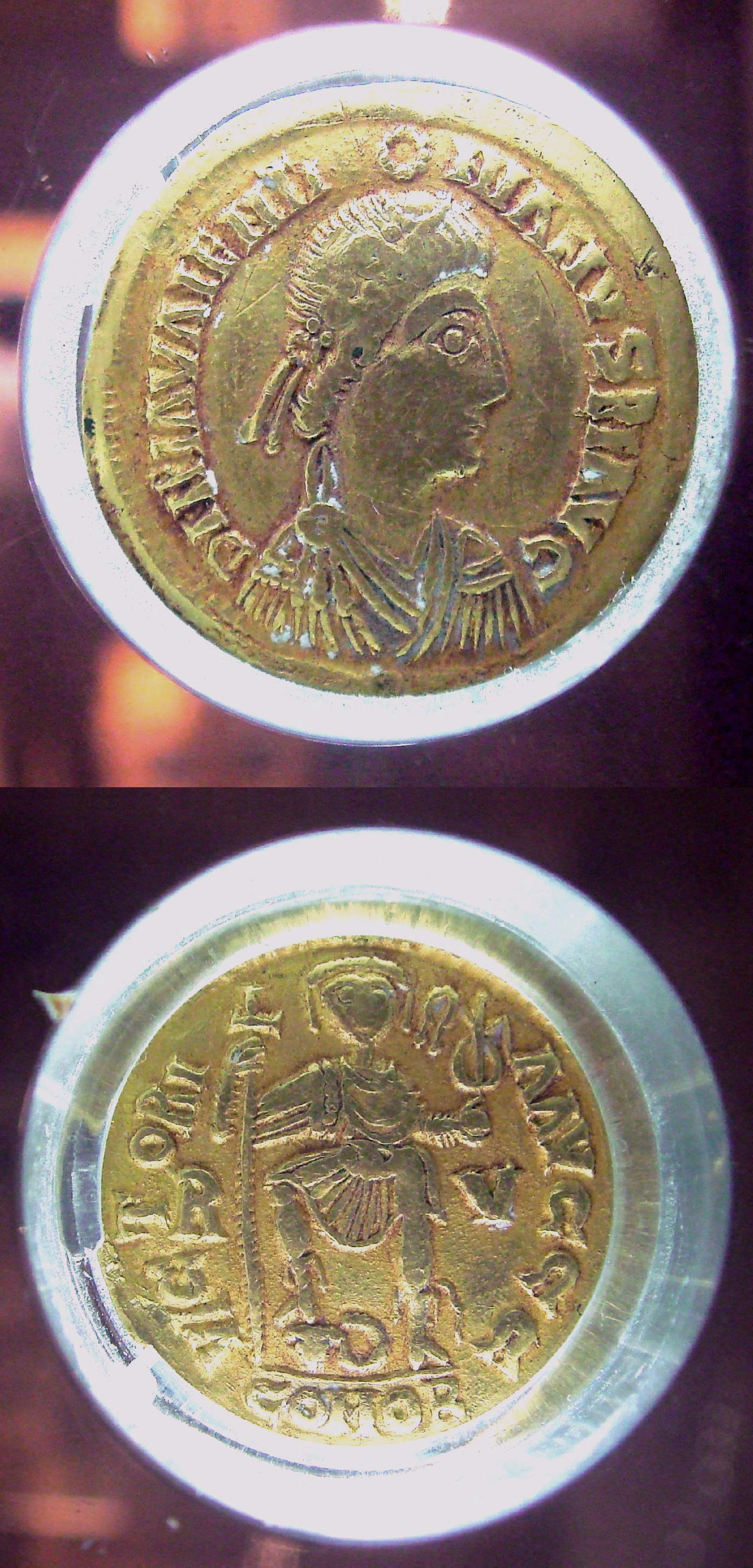
Northern Gaul "sou", 440–450, 4240 mg.

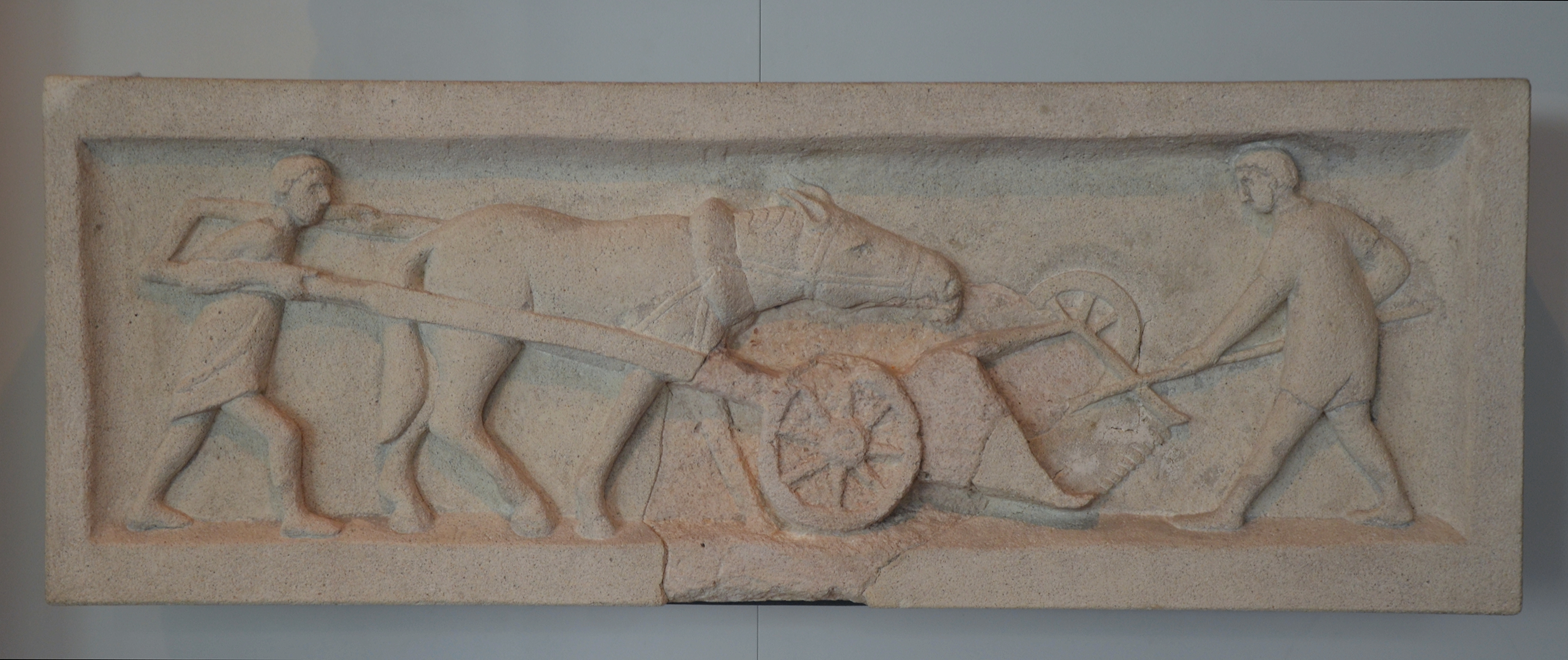
Gallic harvester

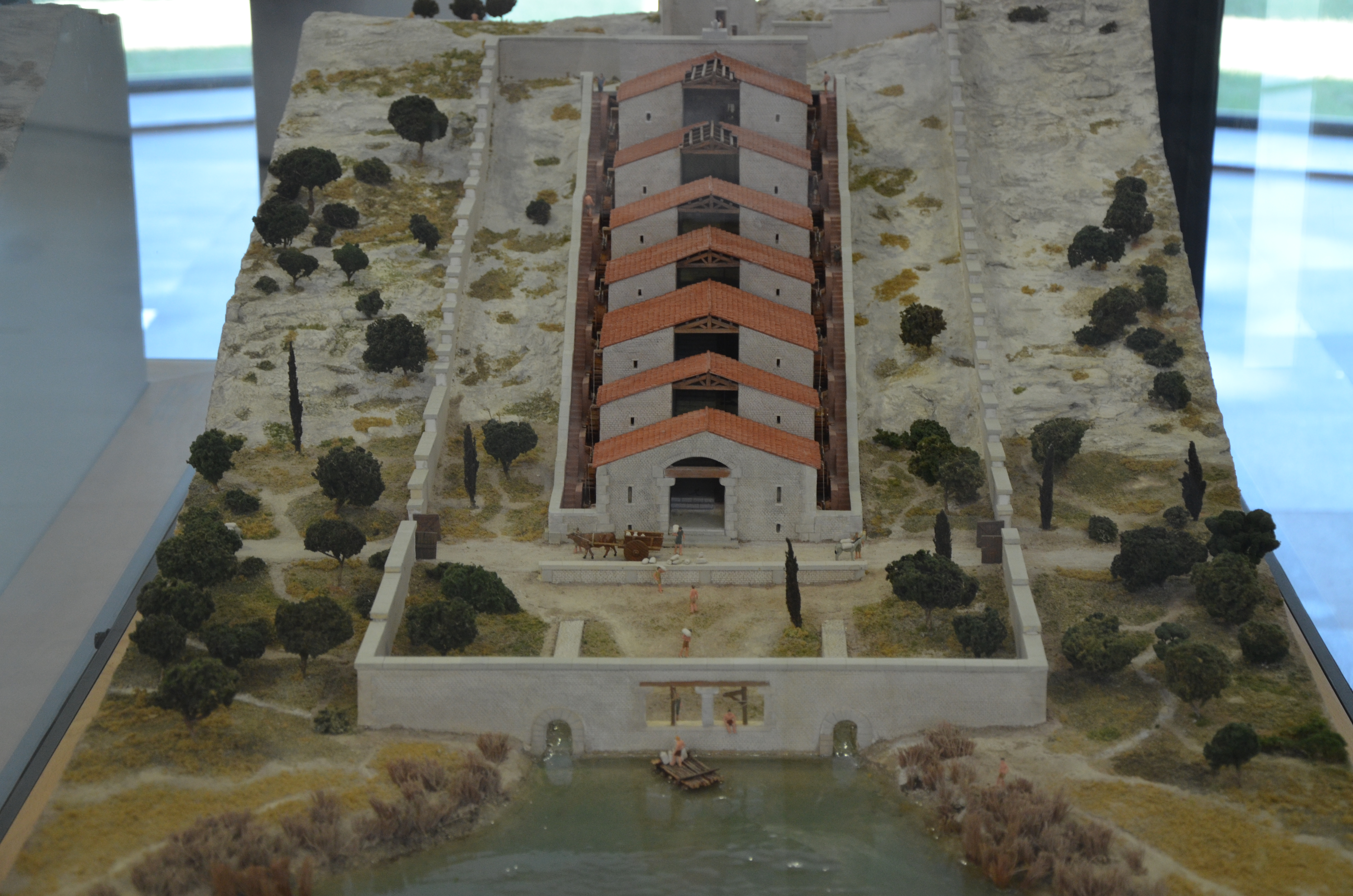
Model of water mills at Barbegal, "the world's first industrial complex"

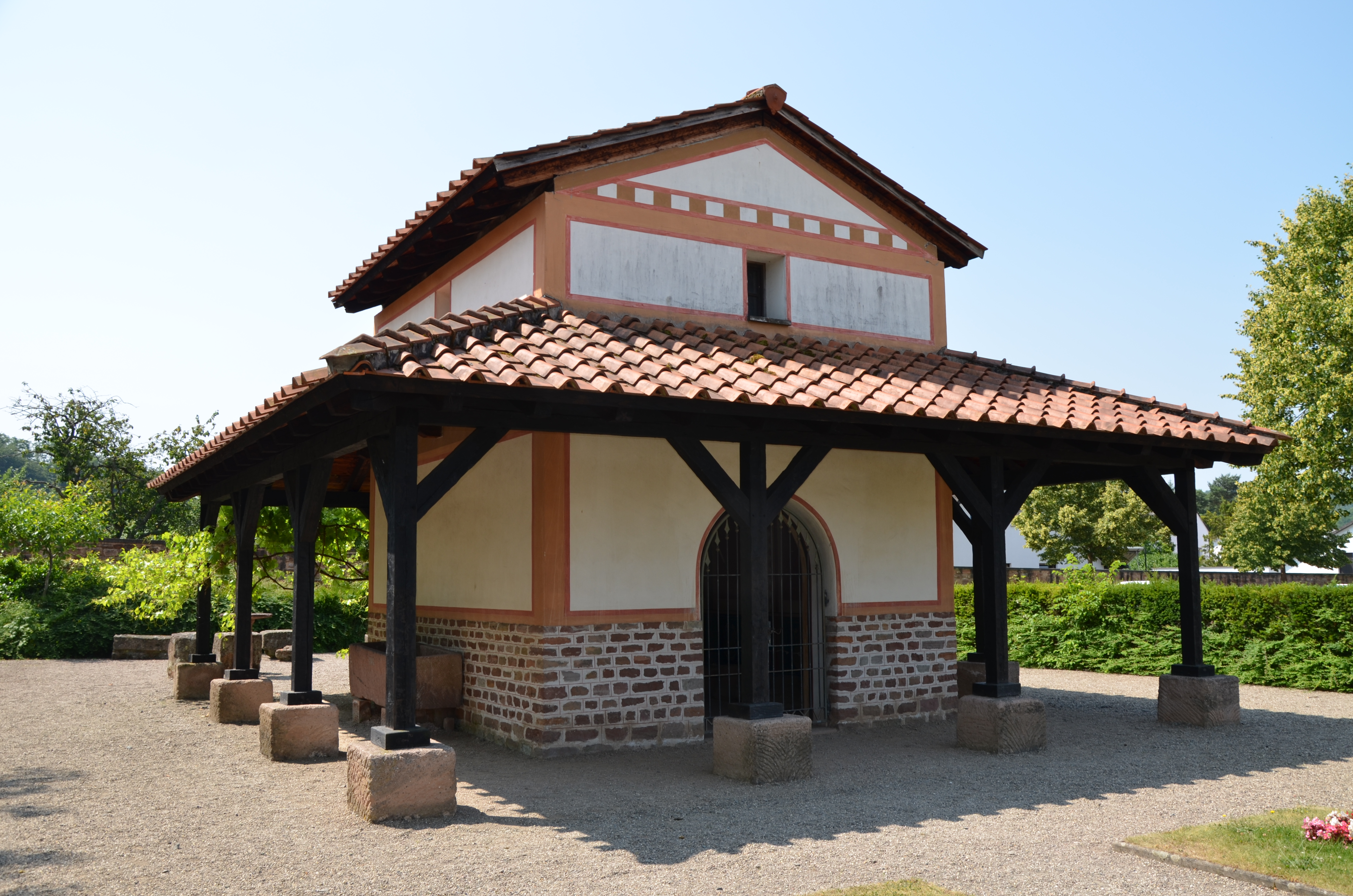
Reconstruction of a Gallo-Roman temple in Schwarzenacker

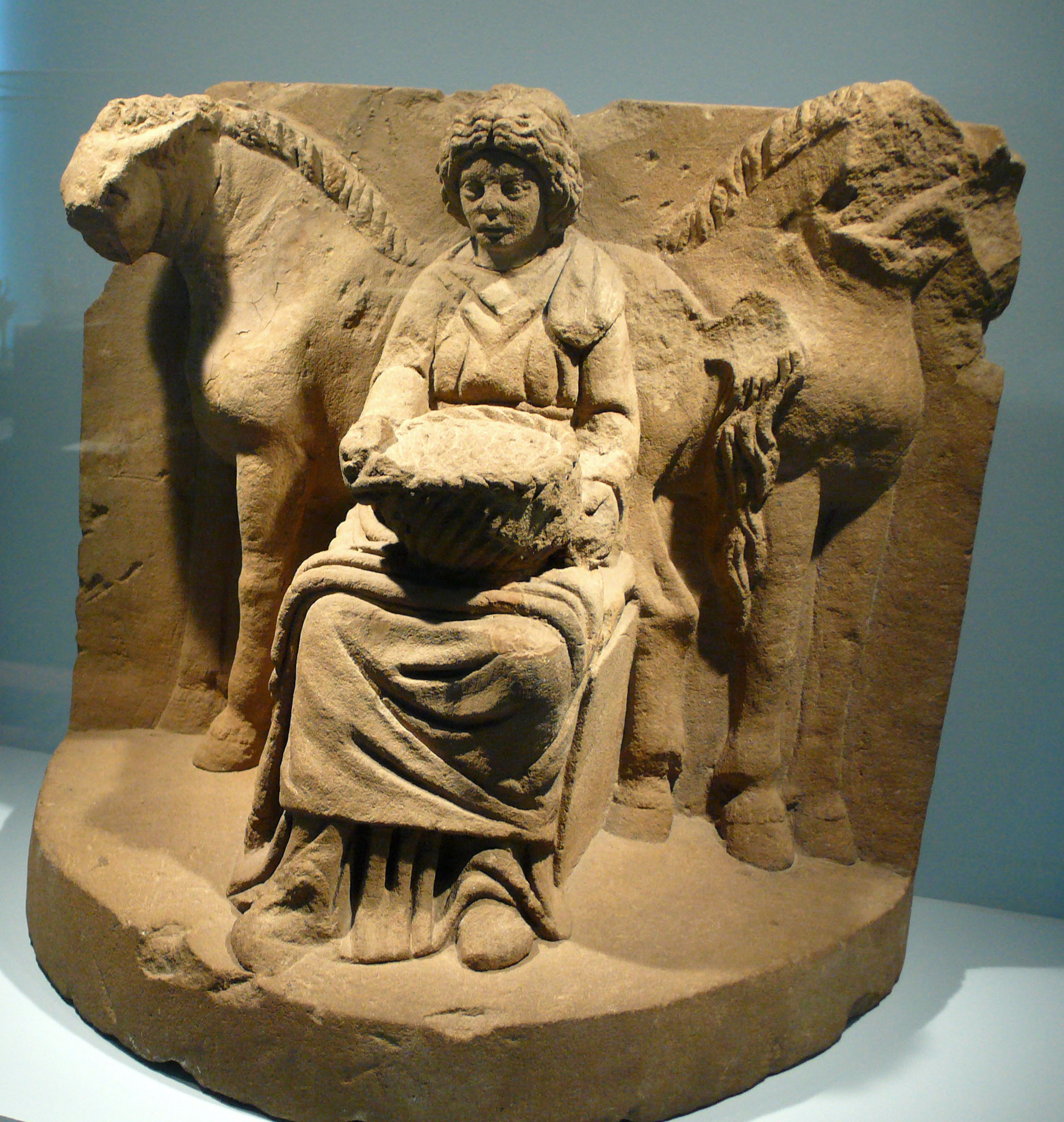
Statue of the Gallic goddess Epona

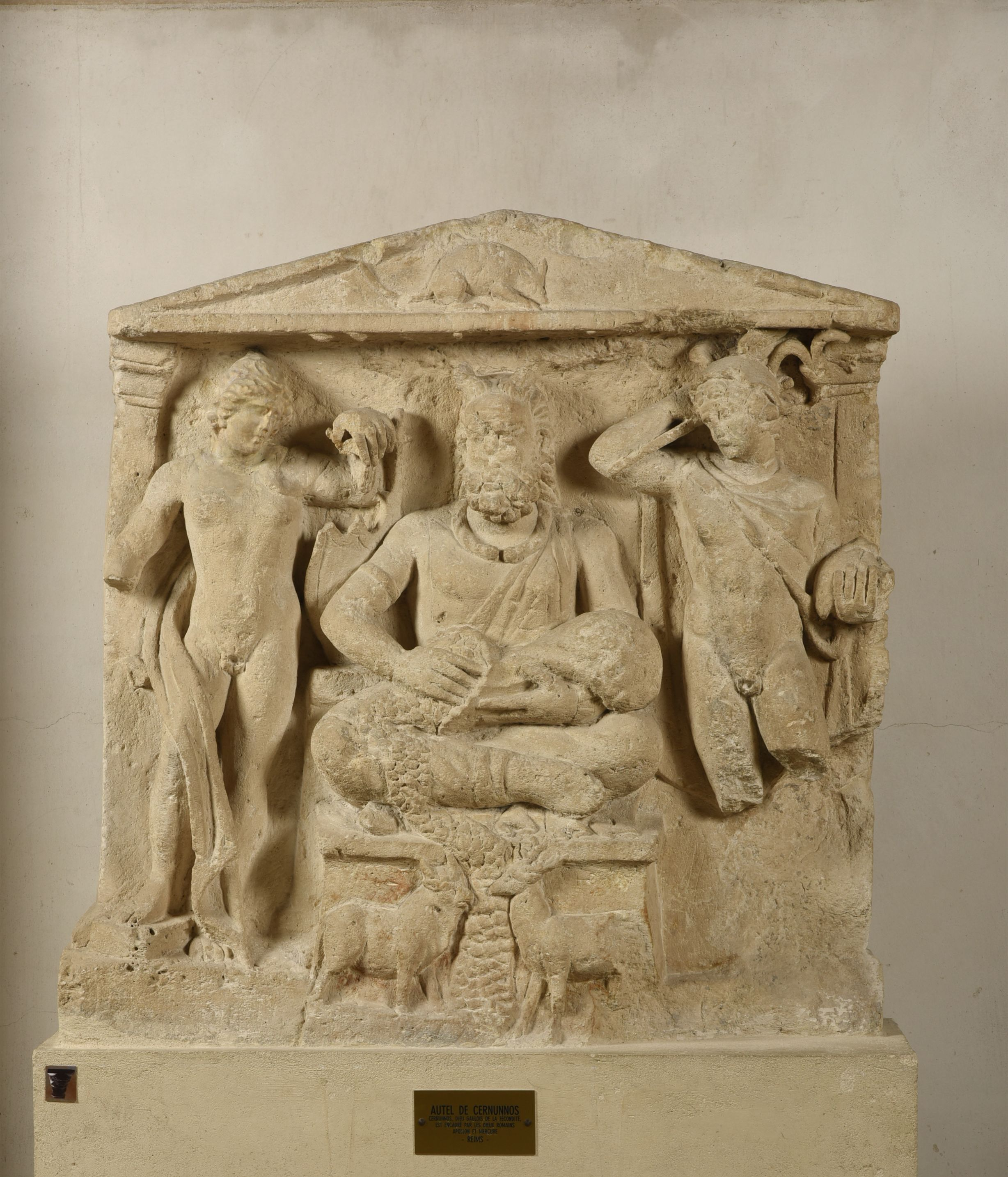
Altar of Cernunnos, Reims

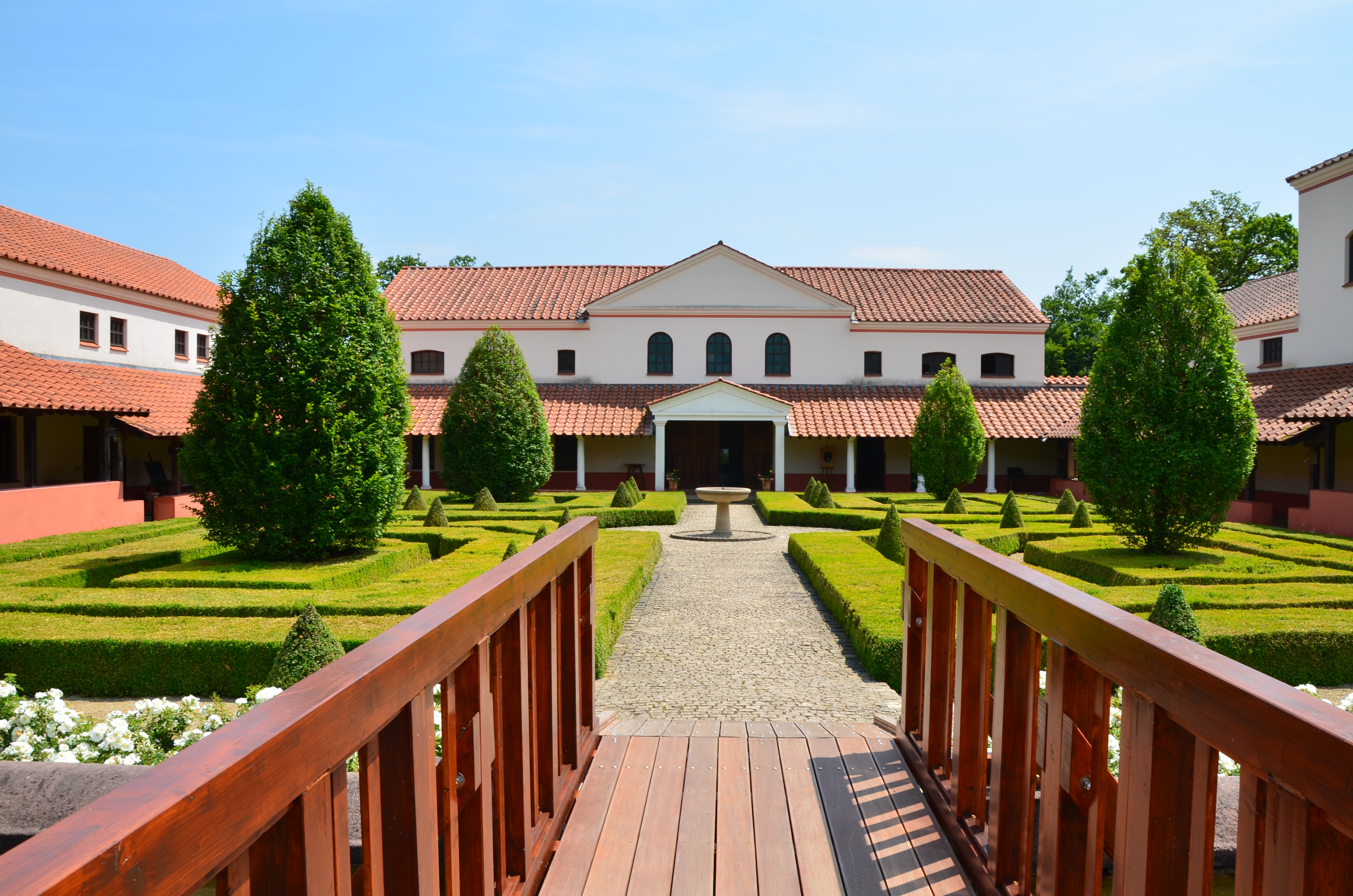
Reconstructed Roman villa in Borg

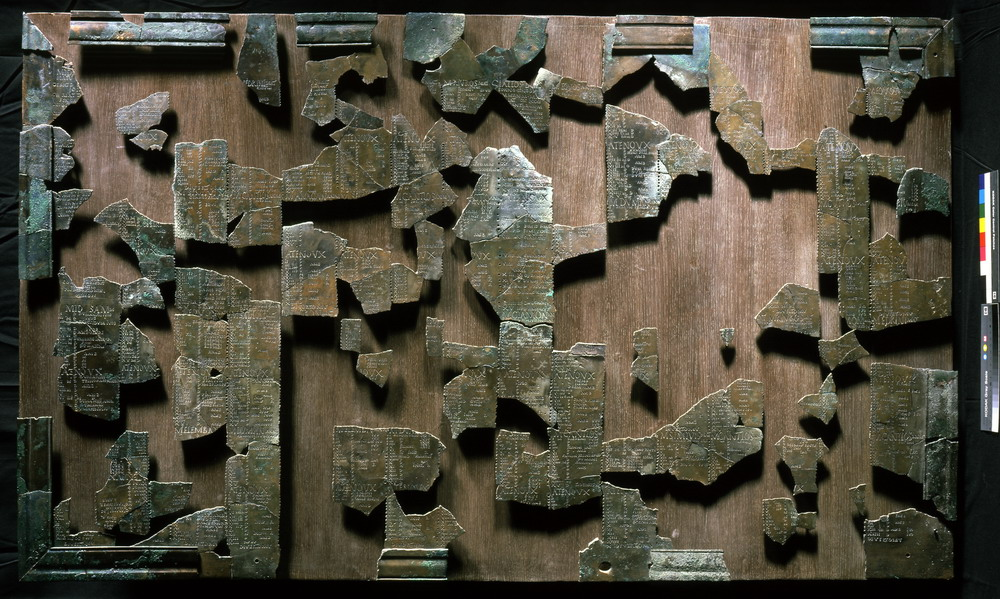
The Coligny calendar

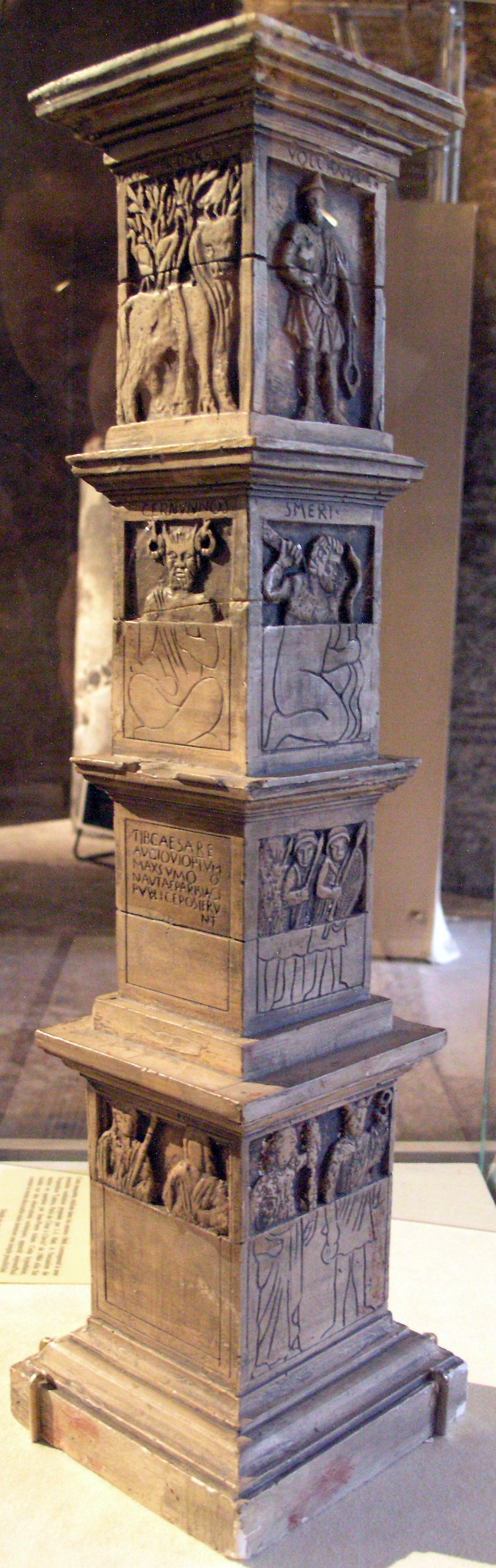
'Pillar of the Boatmen', Paris, France

Sculpture of a ship carrying wine barrels, c. 220 AD

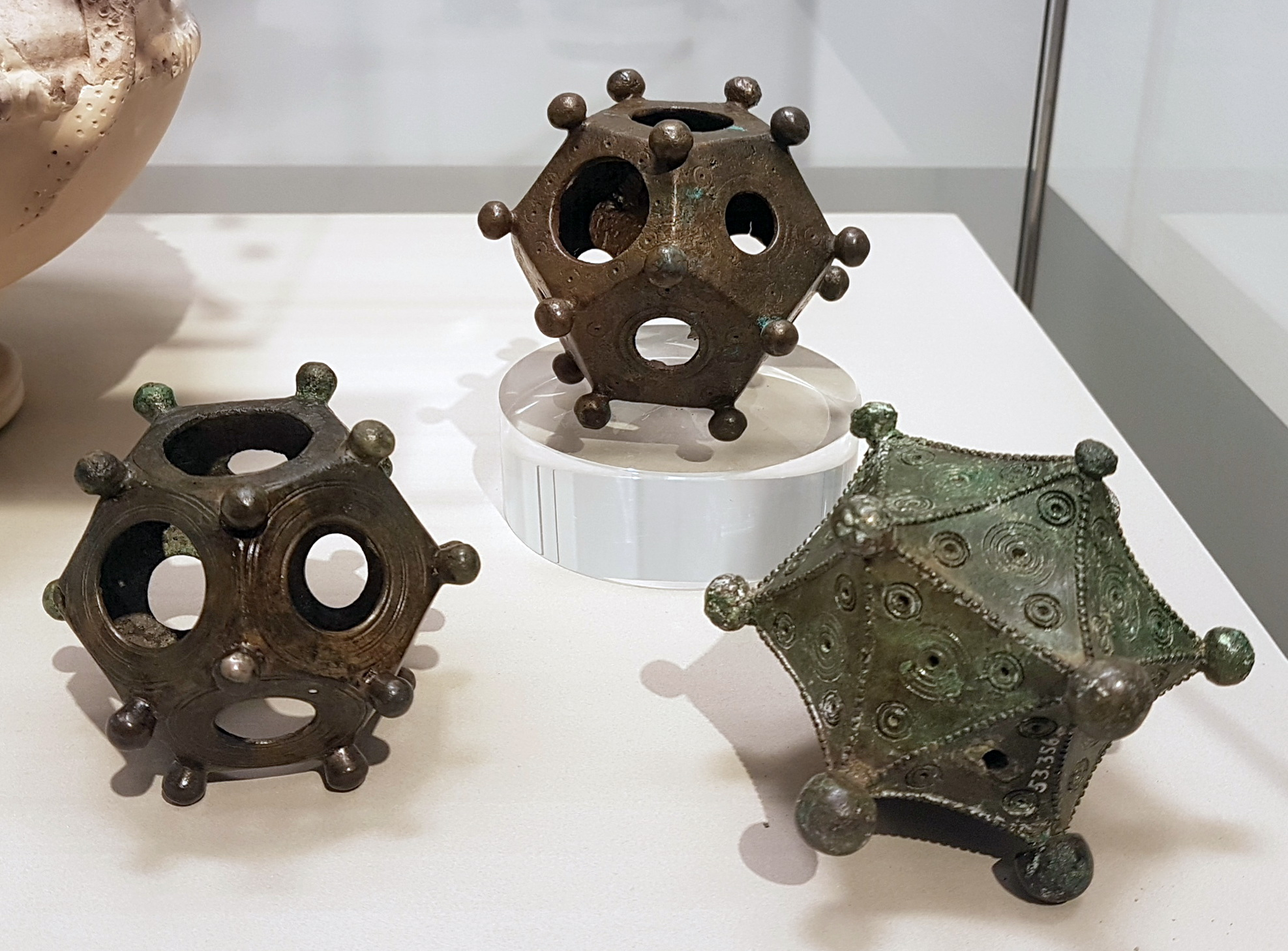
Gallo-Roman dodecahedrons

== Villas in Roman Gaul ==
Villas were usually centres of agricultural production, and were often closely associated with vineries and wine production. The owners were probably mainly local Gallic elites who became quickly romanised after the conquest, and sometimes Romans and Italians who wished to exploit rich local resources. The villas would have been the centre of complex relationships with the local area. Much of the work would have been undertaken by slave labour or by local coloni ("tenant farmers"). There would also have been a farm manager in addition to the inhabiting family.

== Cities of Roman Gaul ==
Important cities of Roman Gaul include Lugdunum (Lyon), Lutetia (Paris), Augusta Treverorum (Trier), Colonia Agrippinensium (Cologne), Burdigala (Bordeaux), Massalia (Marseille), Tolosa (Toulouse), Narbo Martius (Narbonne), Colonia Nemausus (Nîmes), Arelate (Arles), Augustodunum (Autun), Durocortorum (Reims), Arausio (Orange) and Glanum.

=== Gallery ===
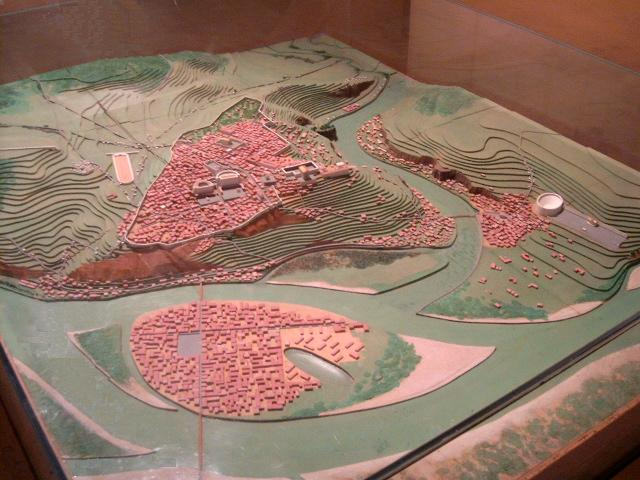
Model of Lugdunum (Lyon)

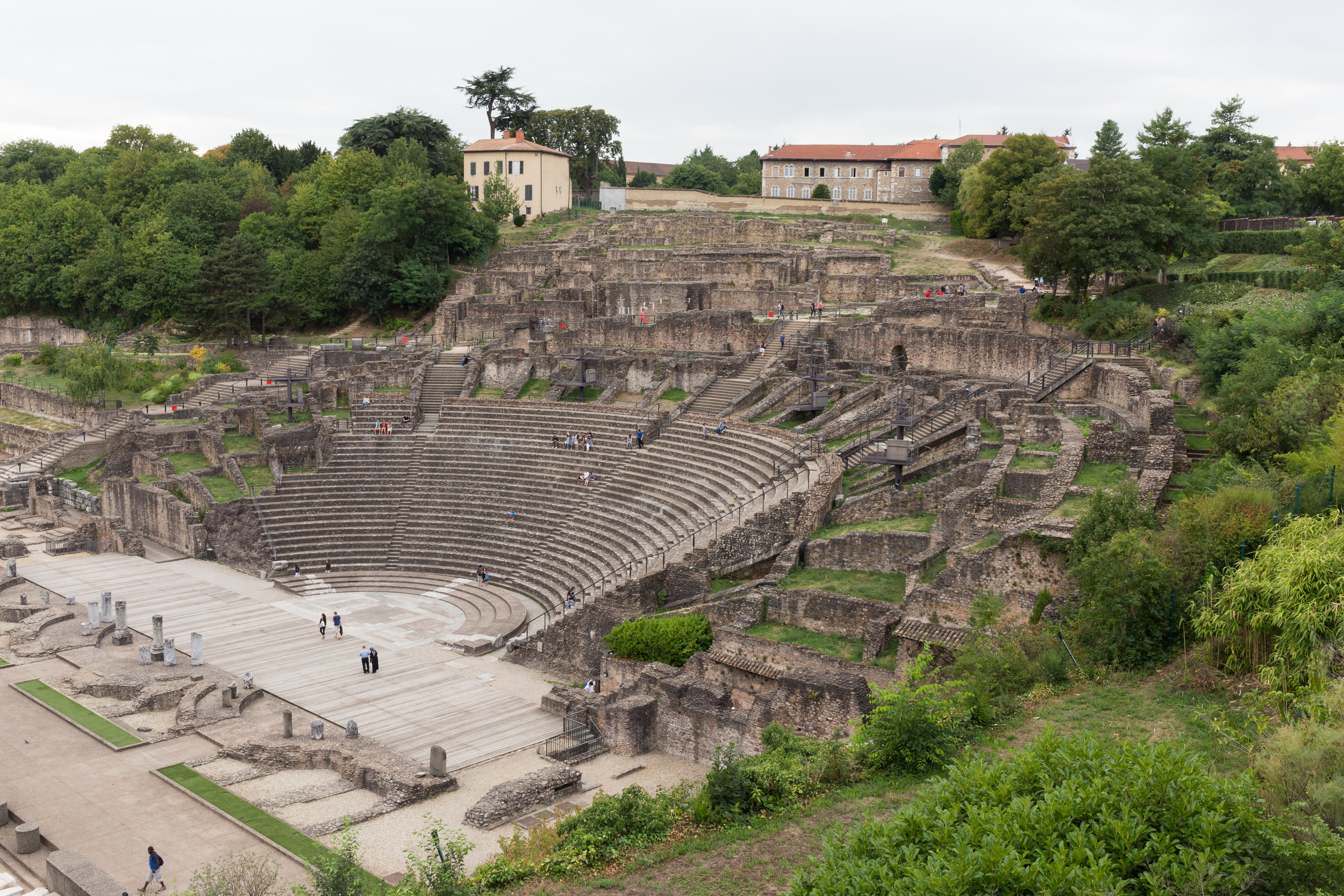
Roman theatre in Lyon

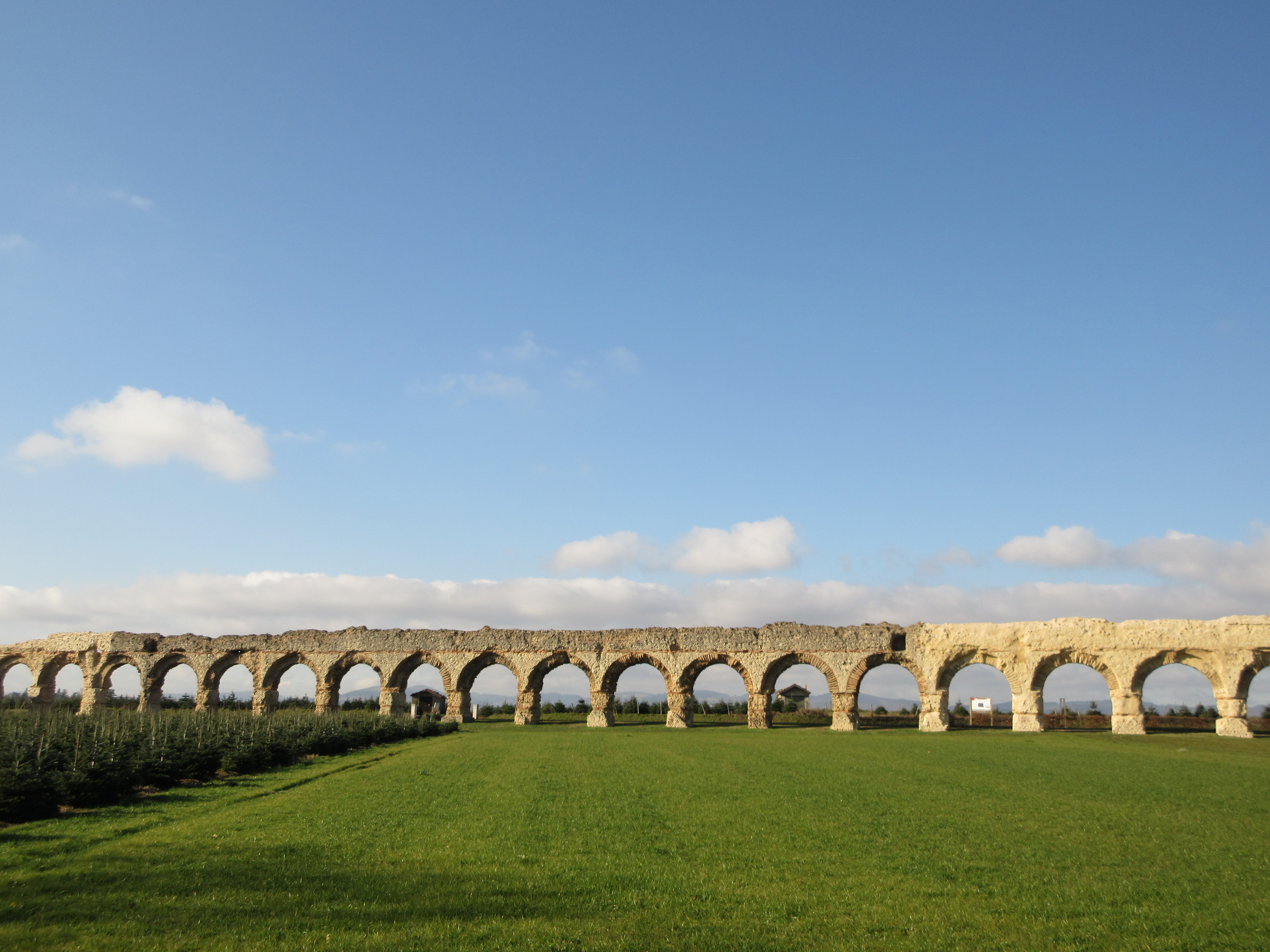
Aqueduct in Lyon

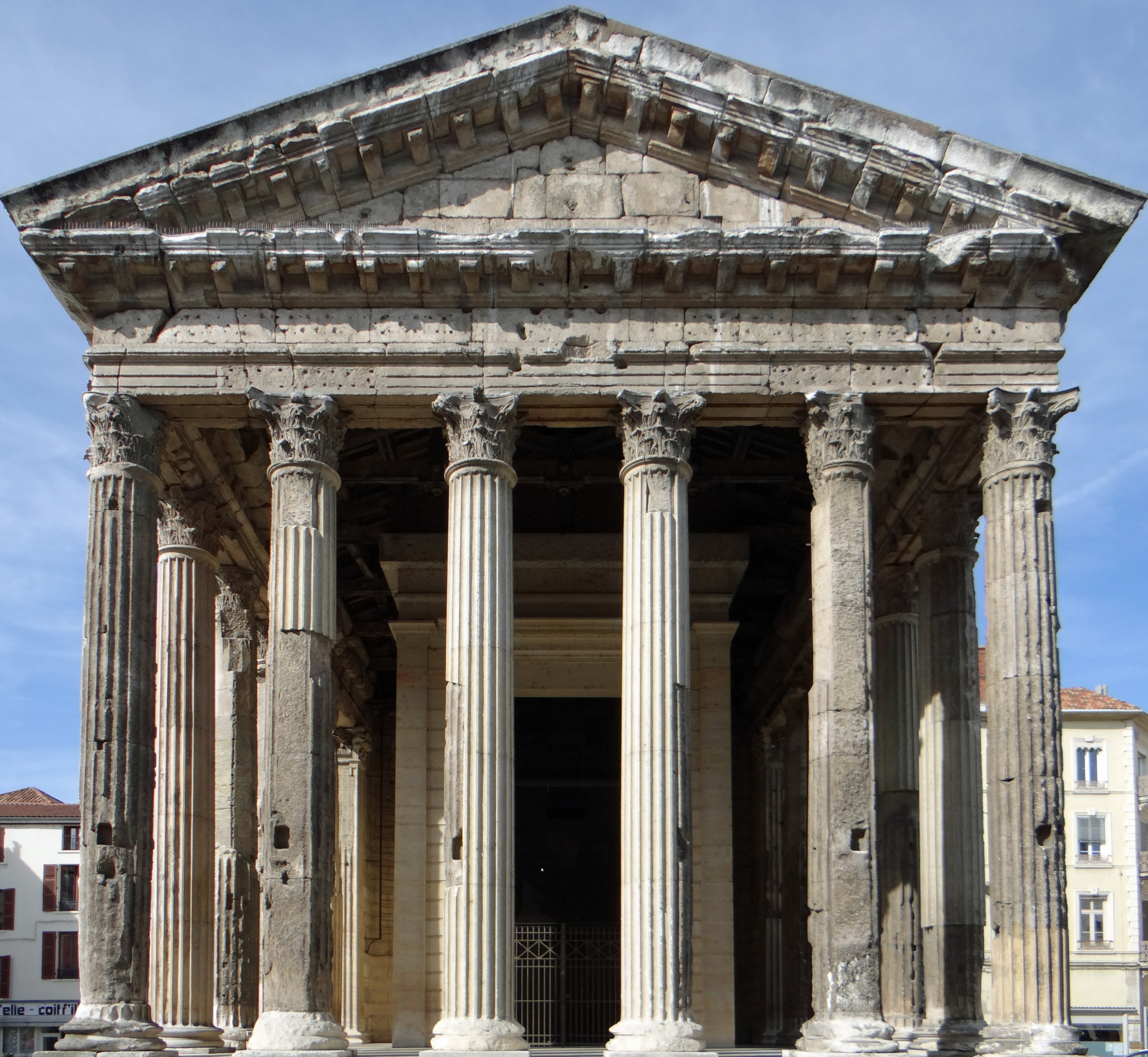
Temple of Augustus and Livia, Vienne

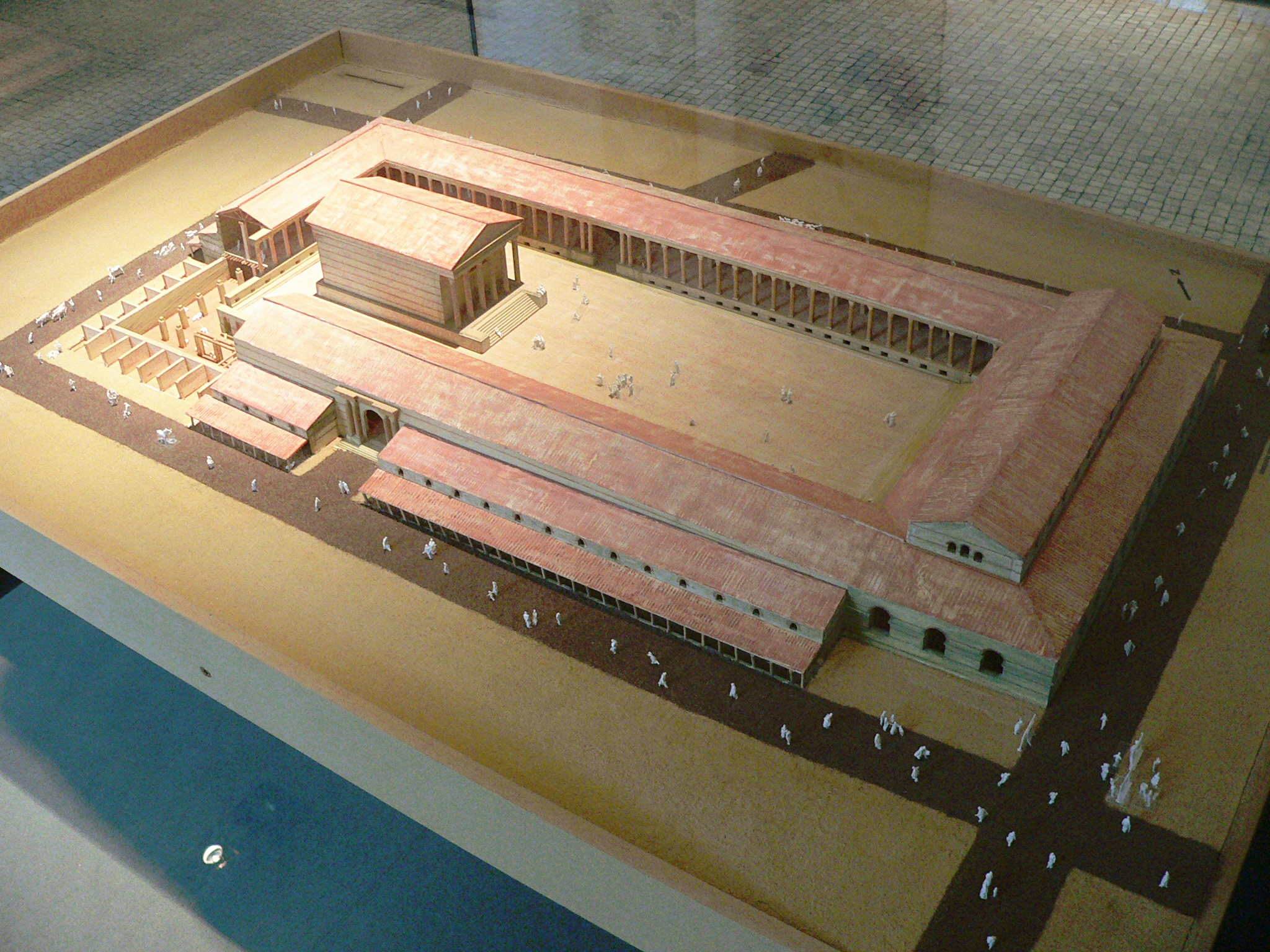
Model of the forum of Lutecia (Paris)

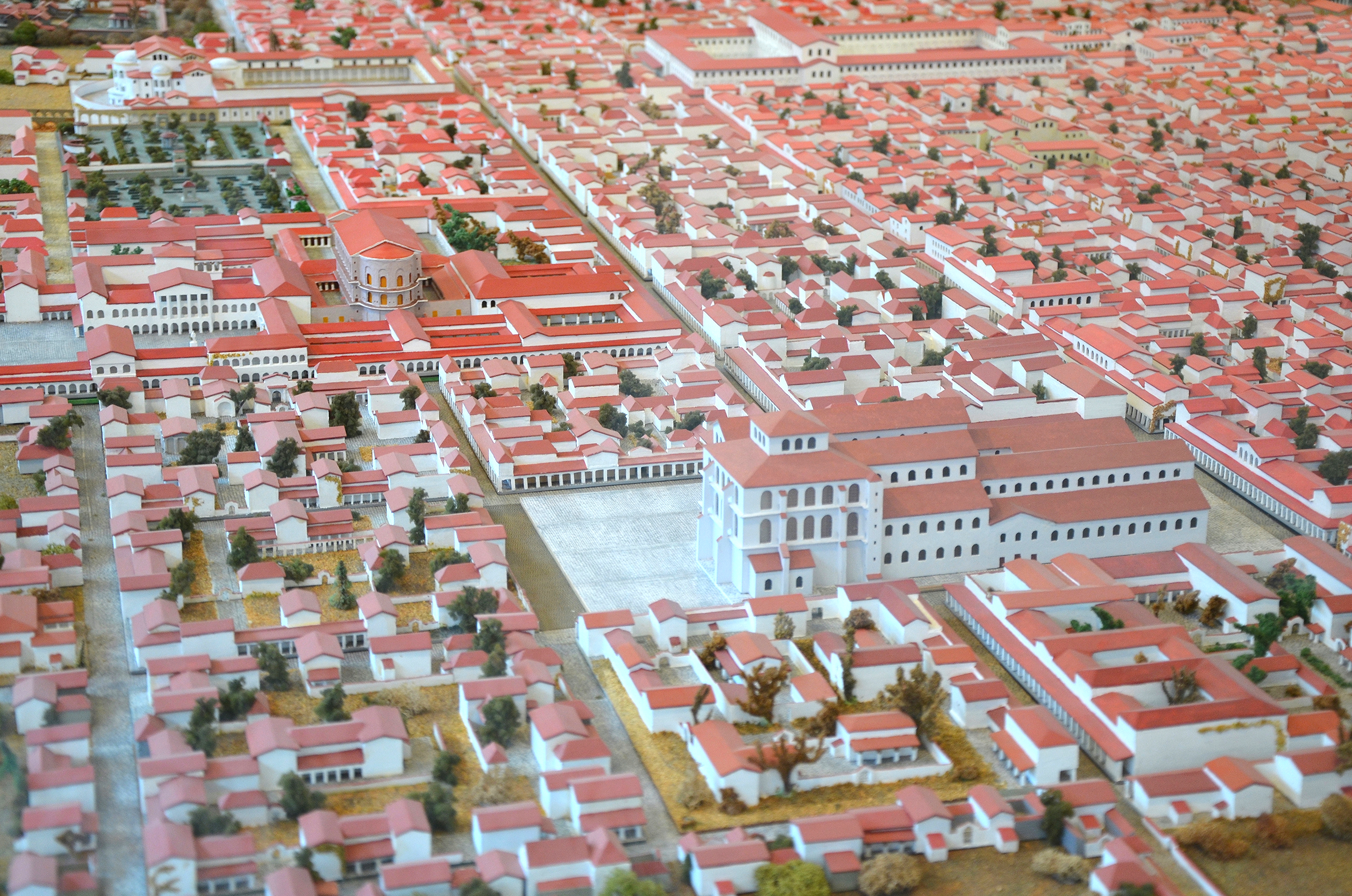
Model of Augusta Trevorum (Trier)

Porta Nigra, Trier

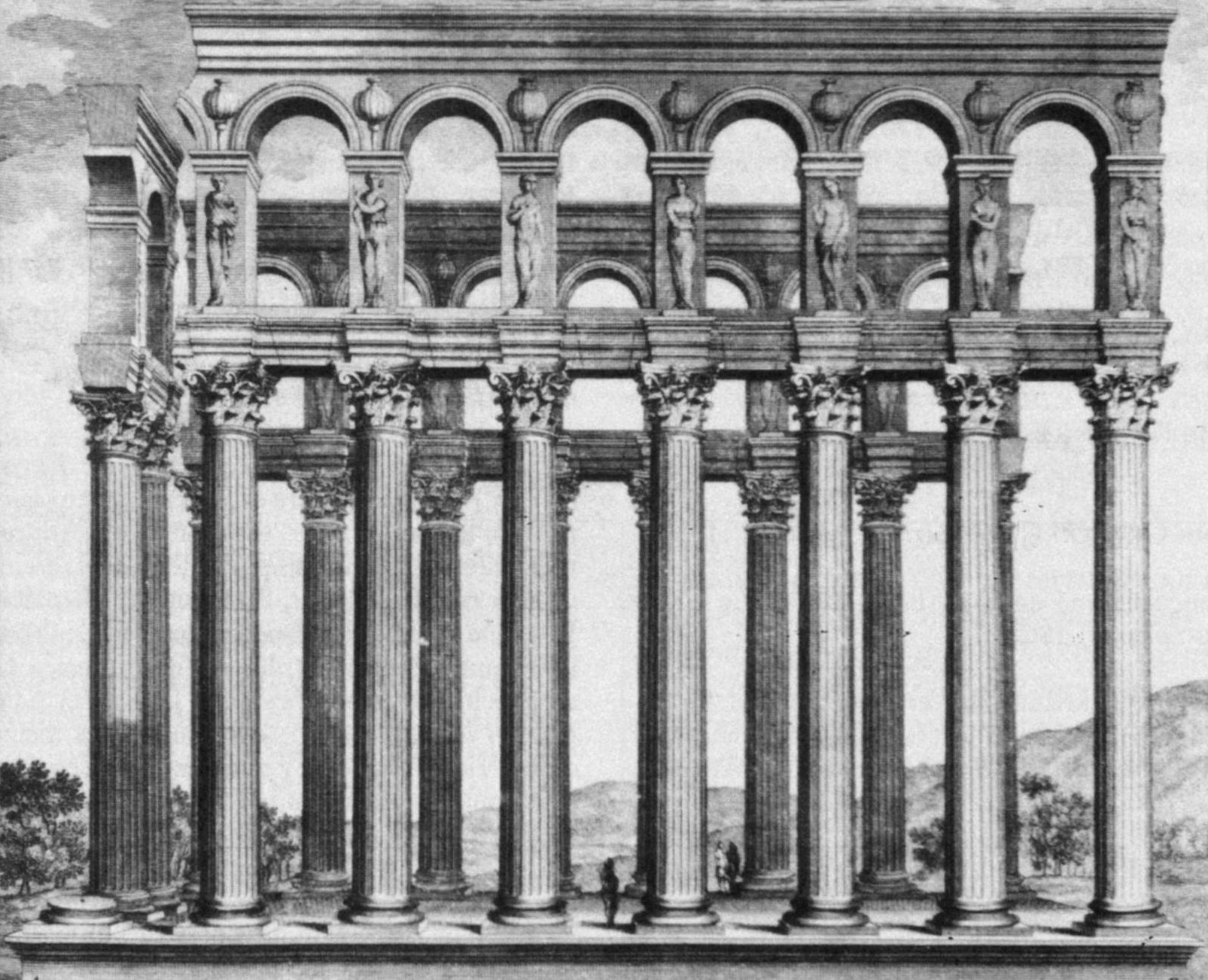
The Piliers de Tutelle in Bordeaux

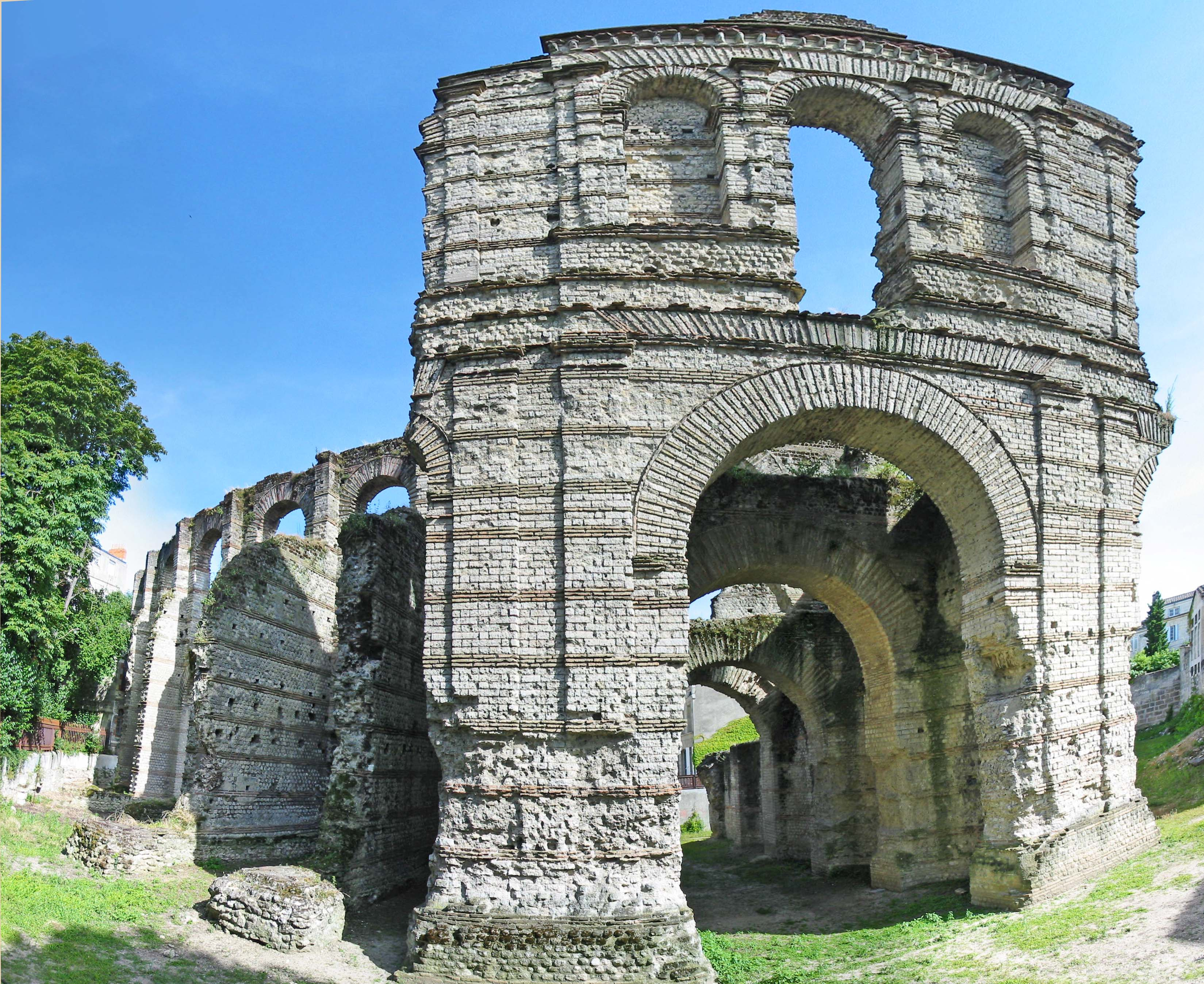
The Palais Gallien in Bordeaux

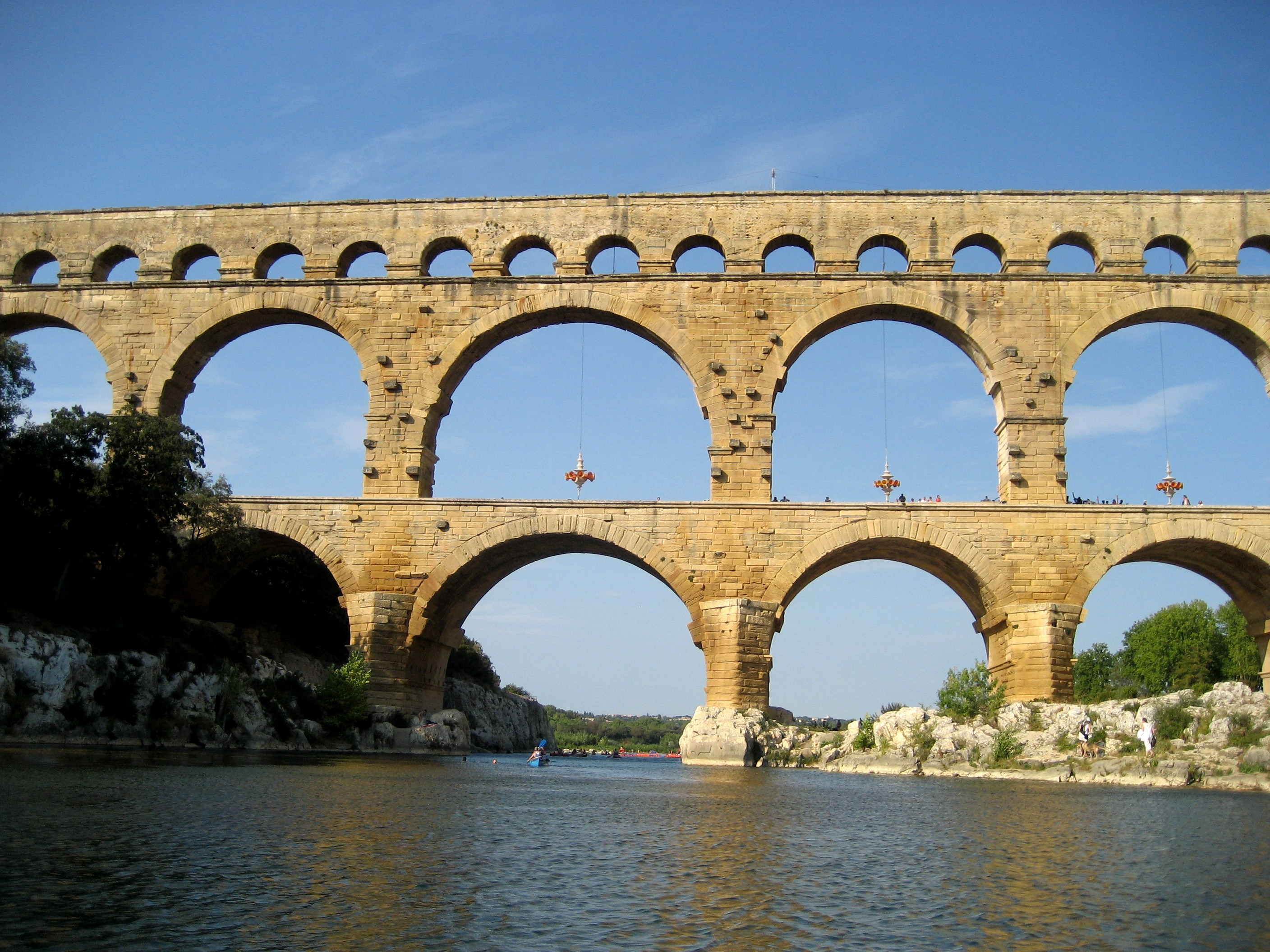
The Pont du Gard near Nimes

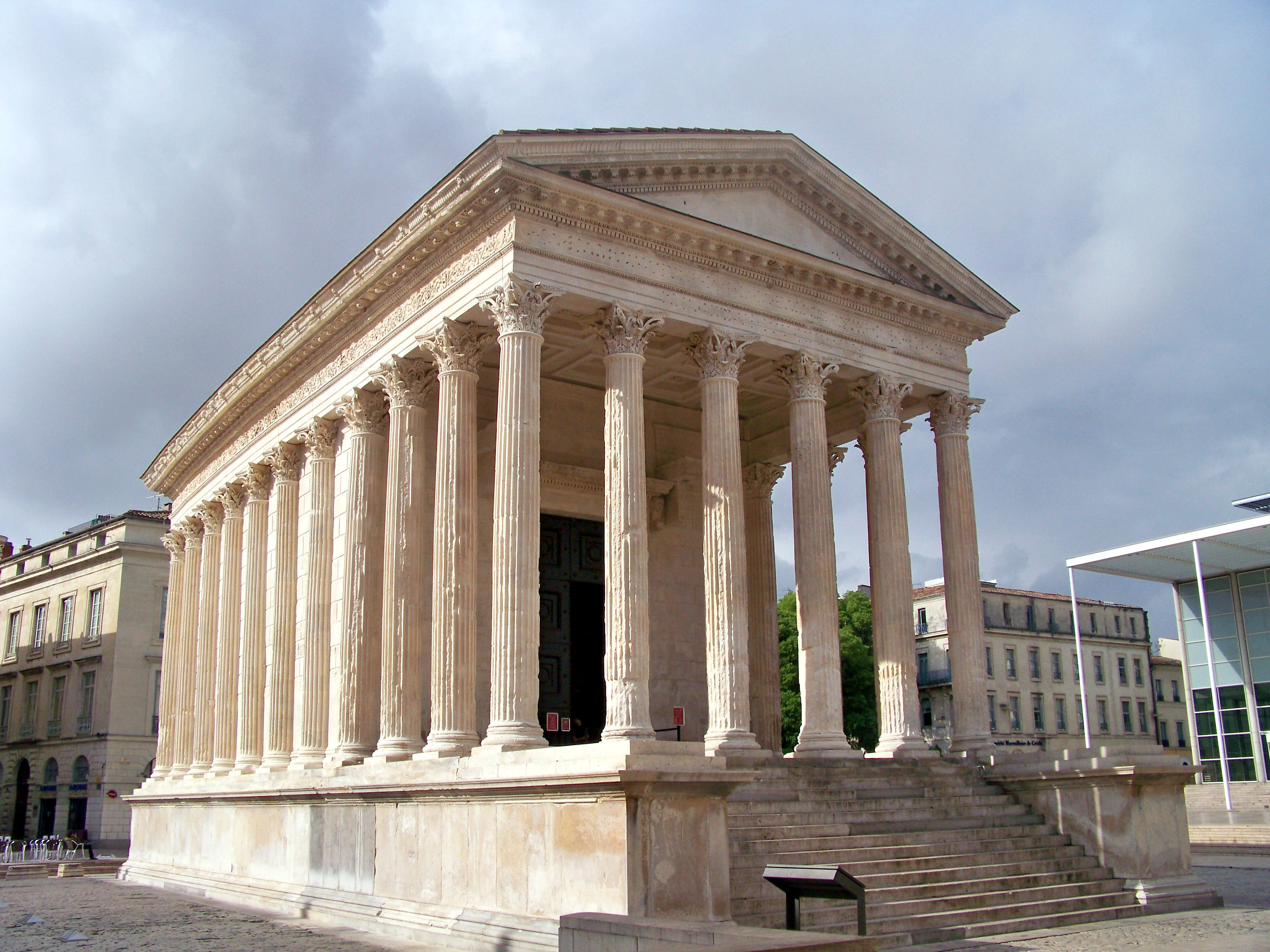
The Maison Carree in Nimes

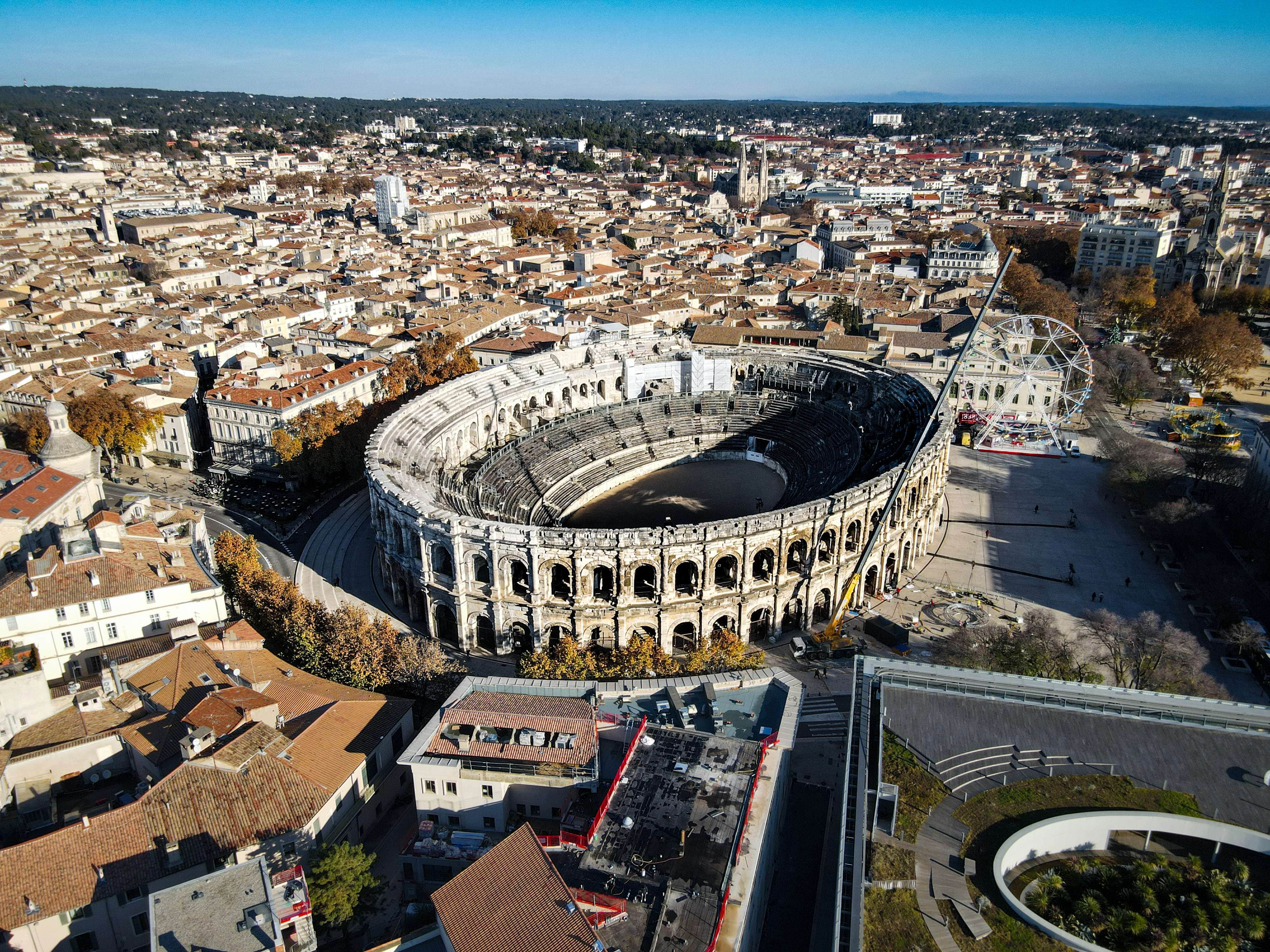
The Roman amphitheatre in Nimes

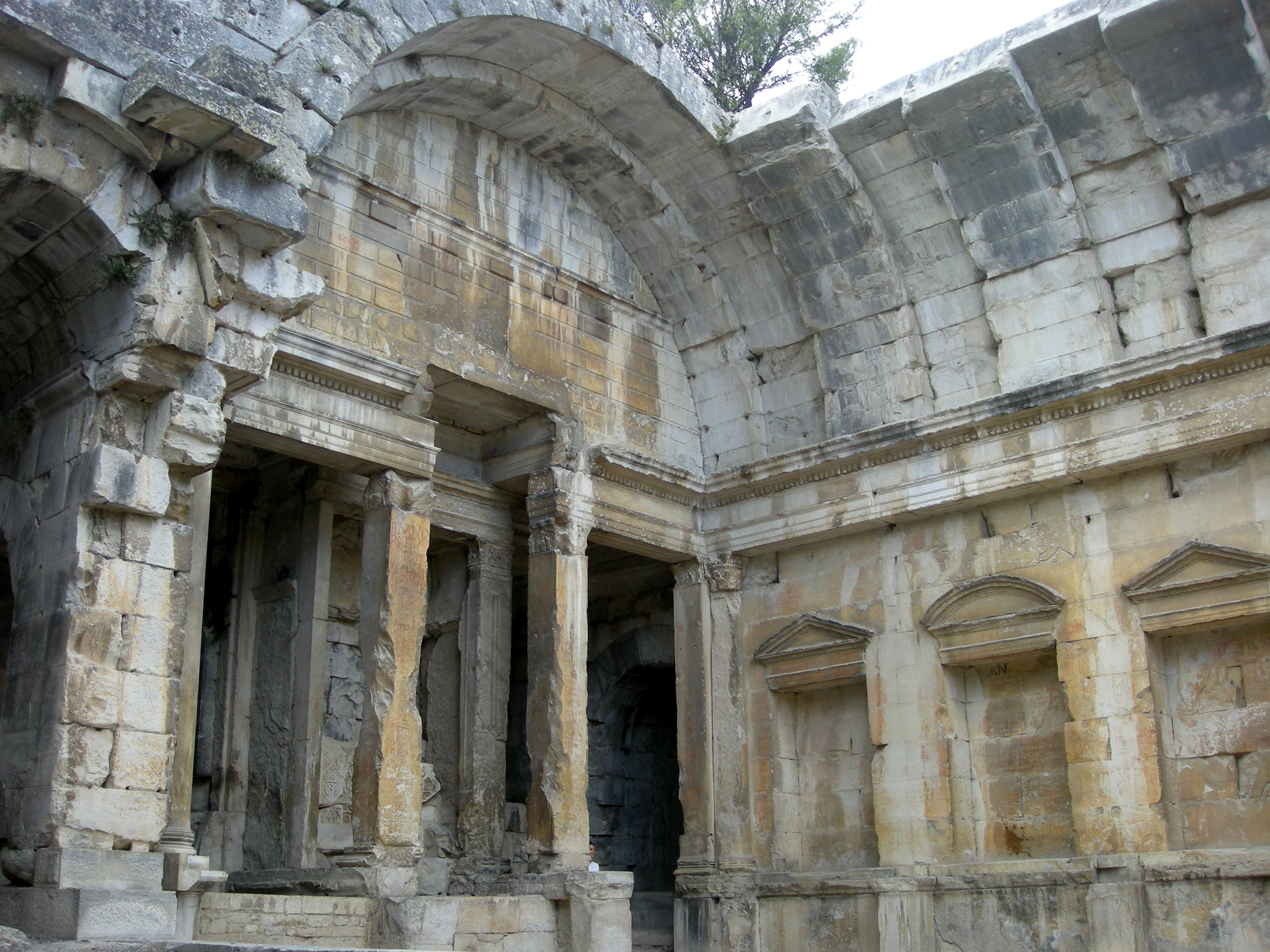
Temple of Diana in Nimes

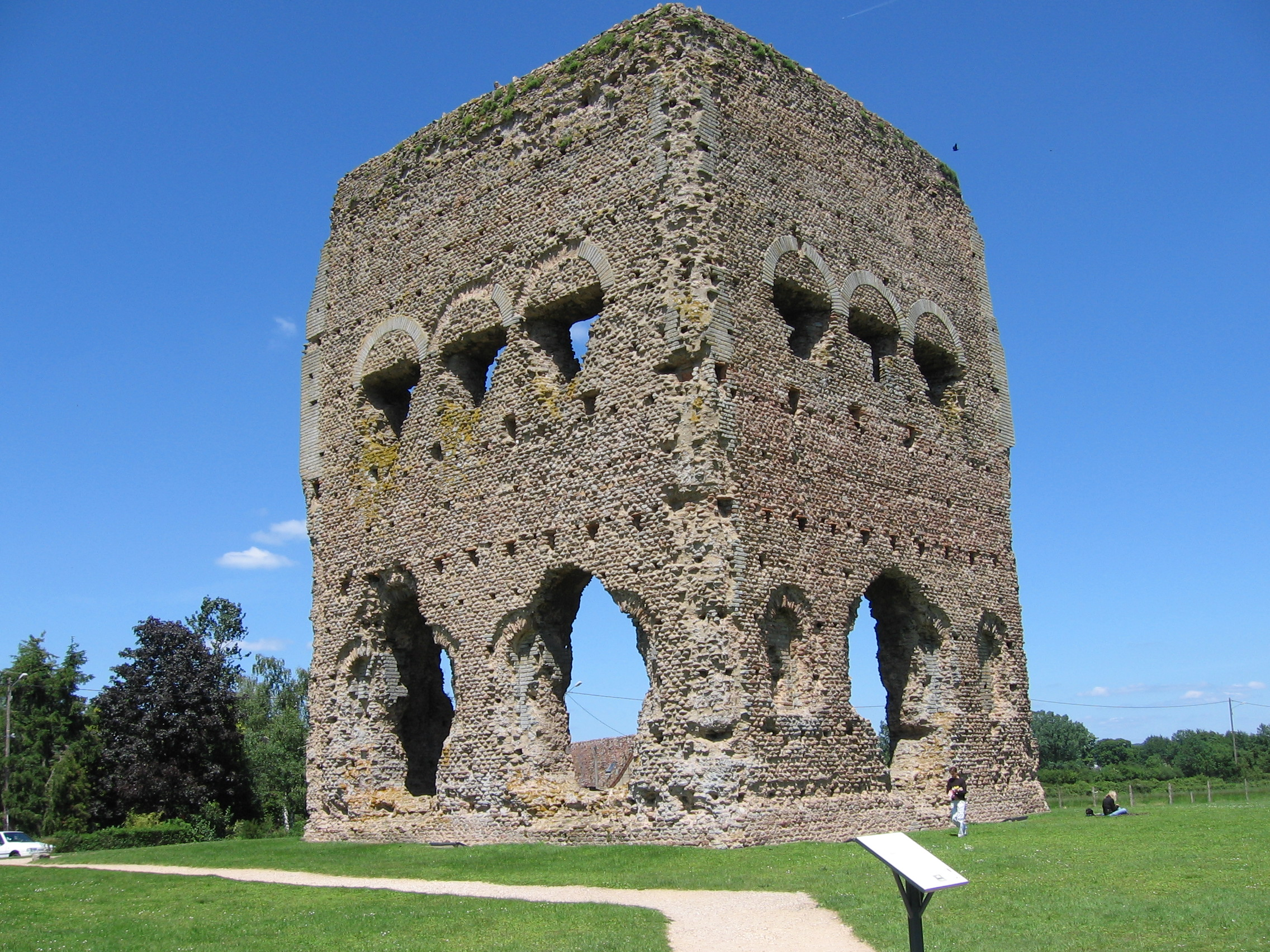
Temple of Janus in Autun

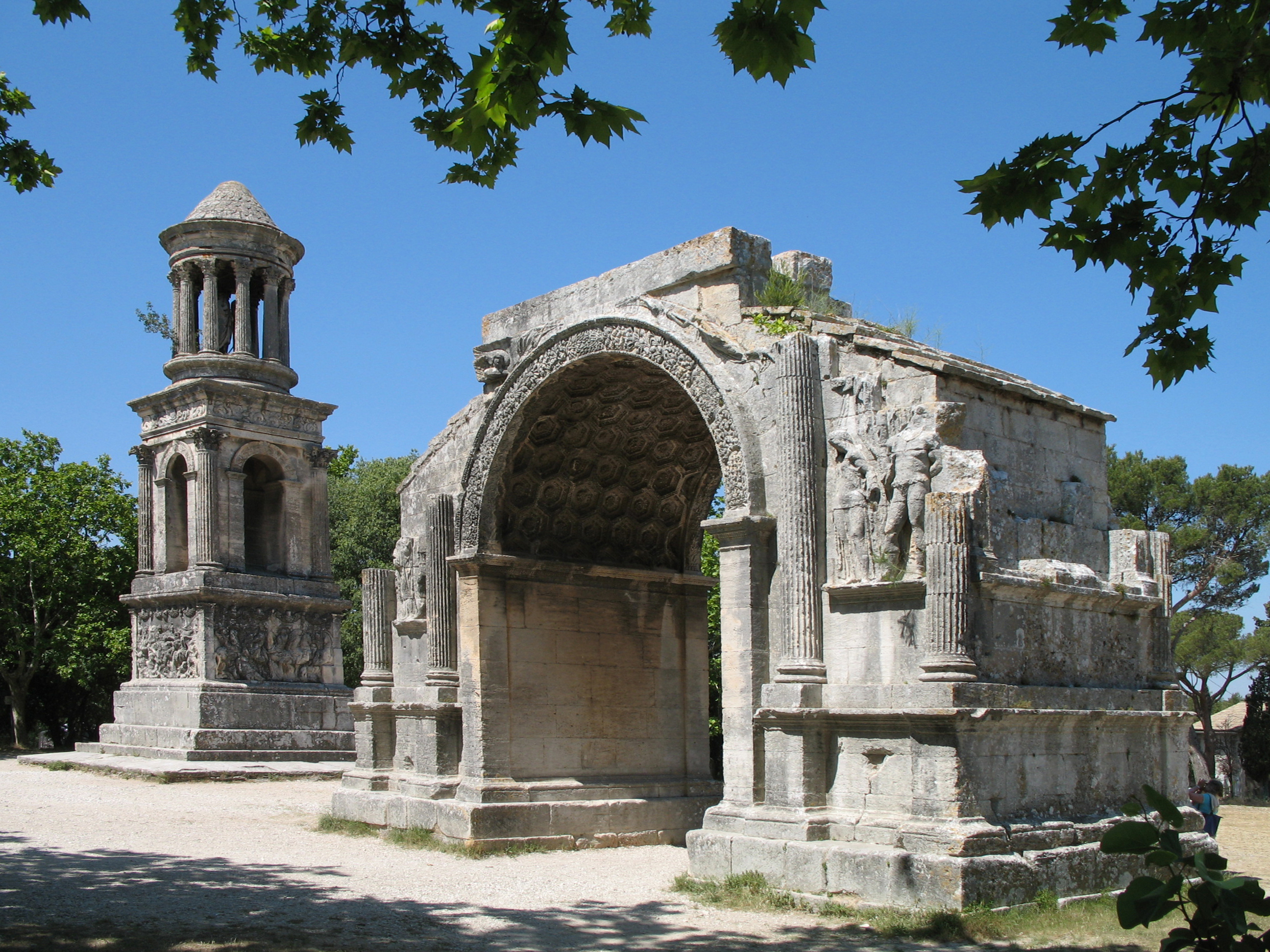
Monumental arch and mausoleum at Glanum

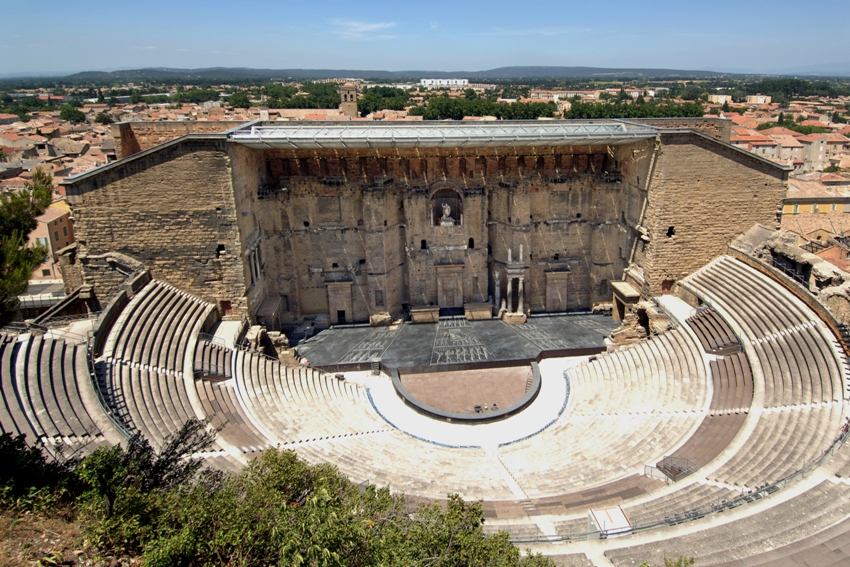
Roman theatre in Orange

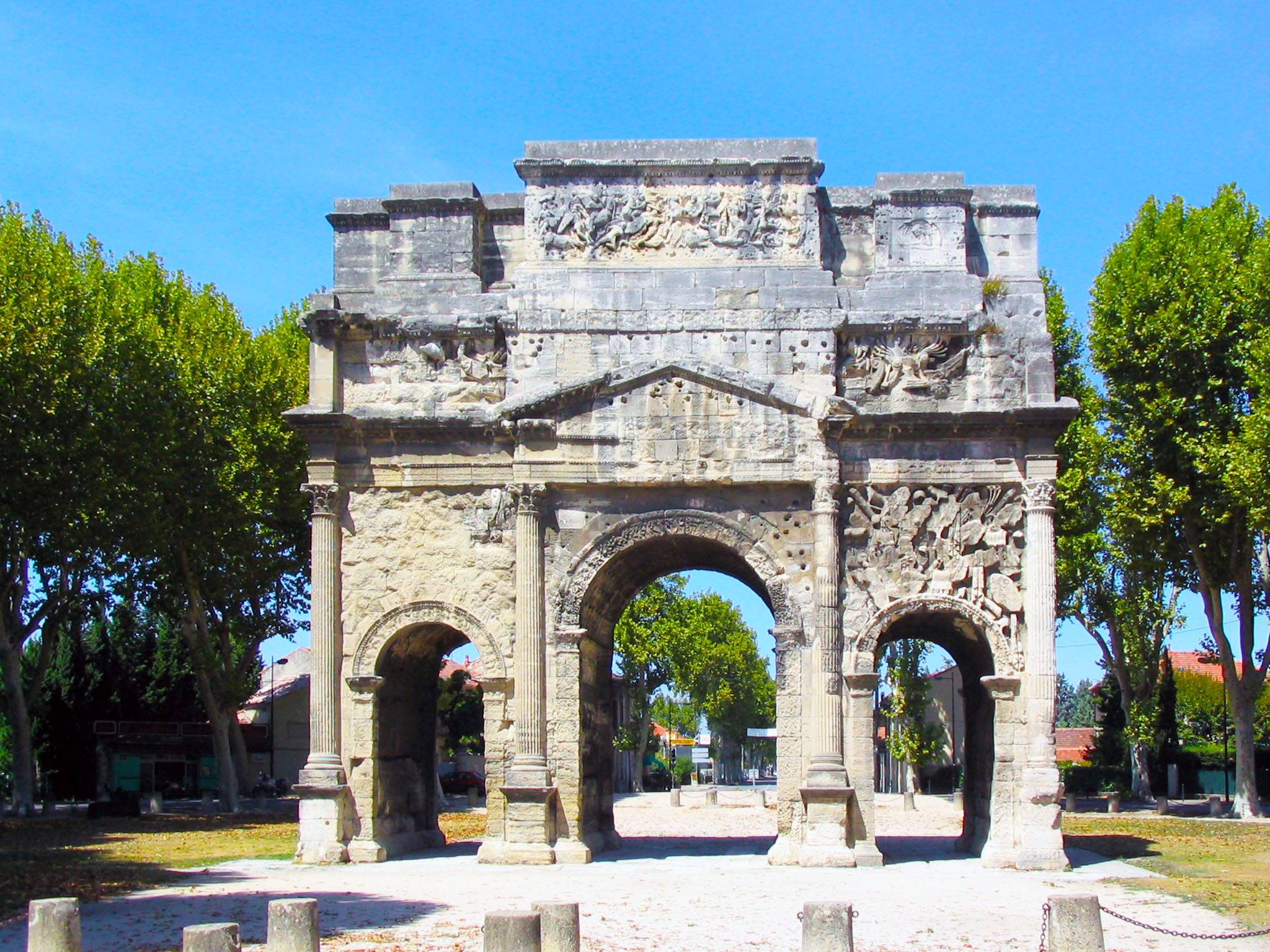
Monumental arch in Orange

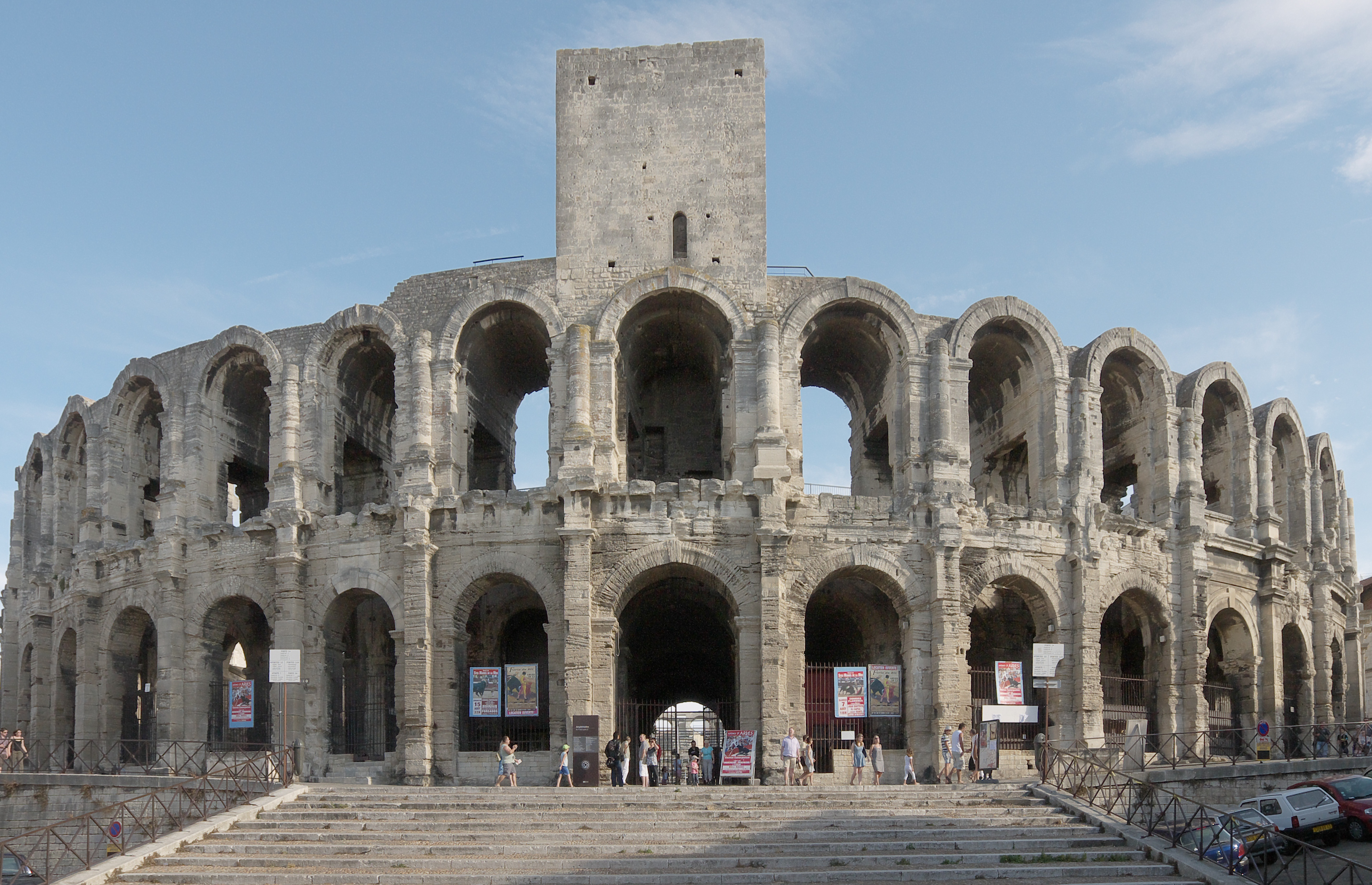
Roman amphitheatre in Arles

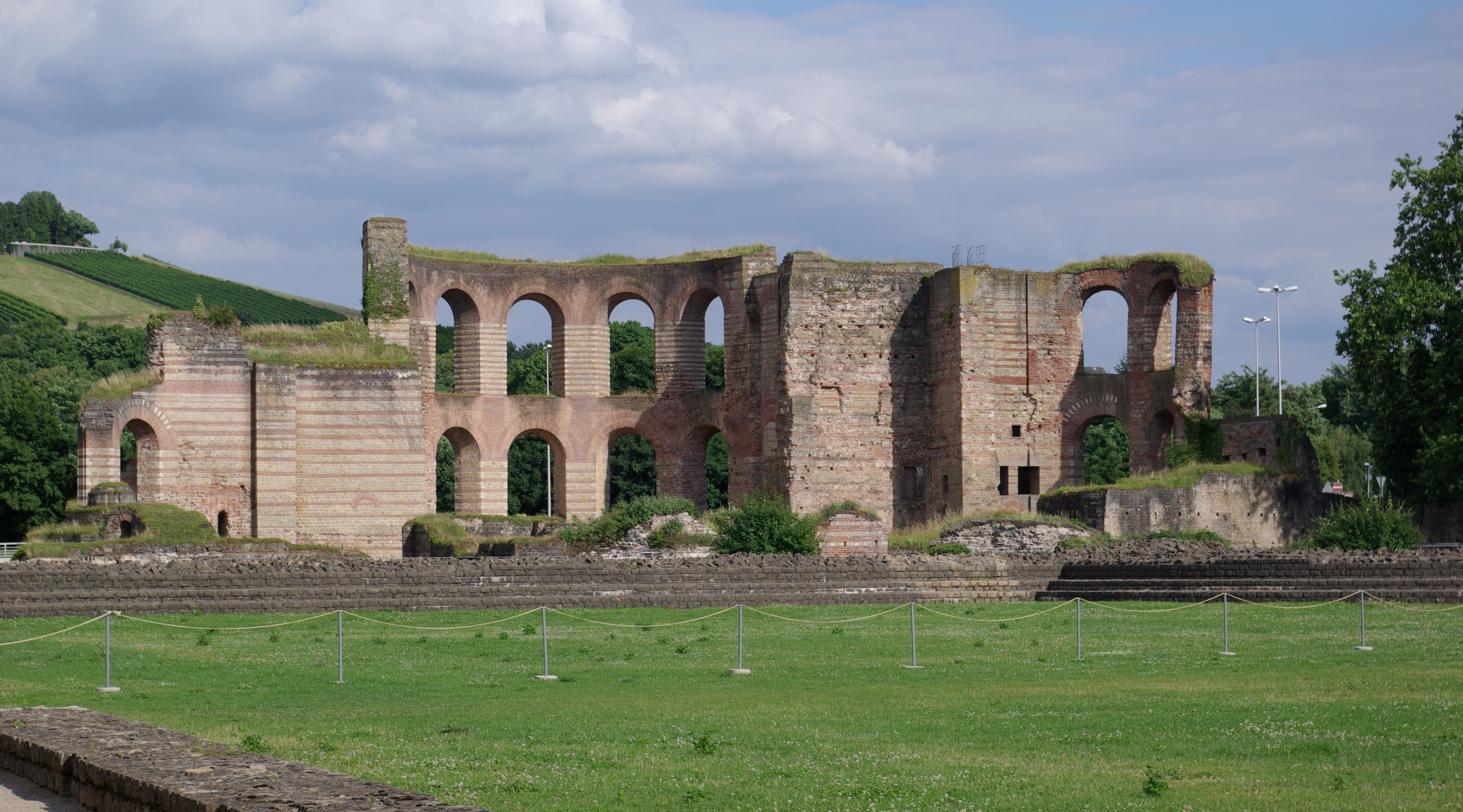
Roman baths in Trier

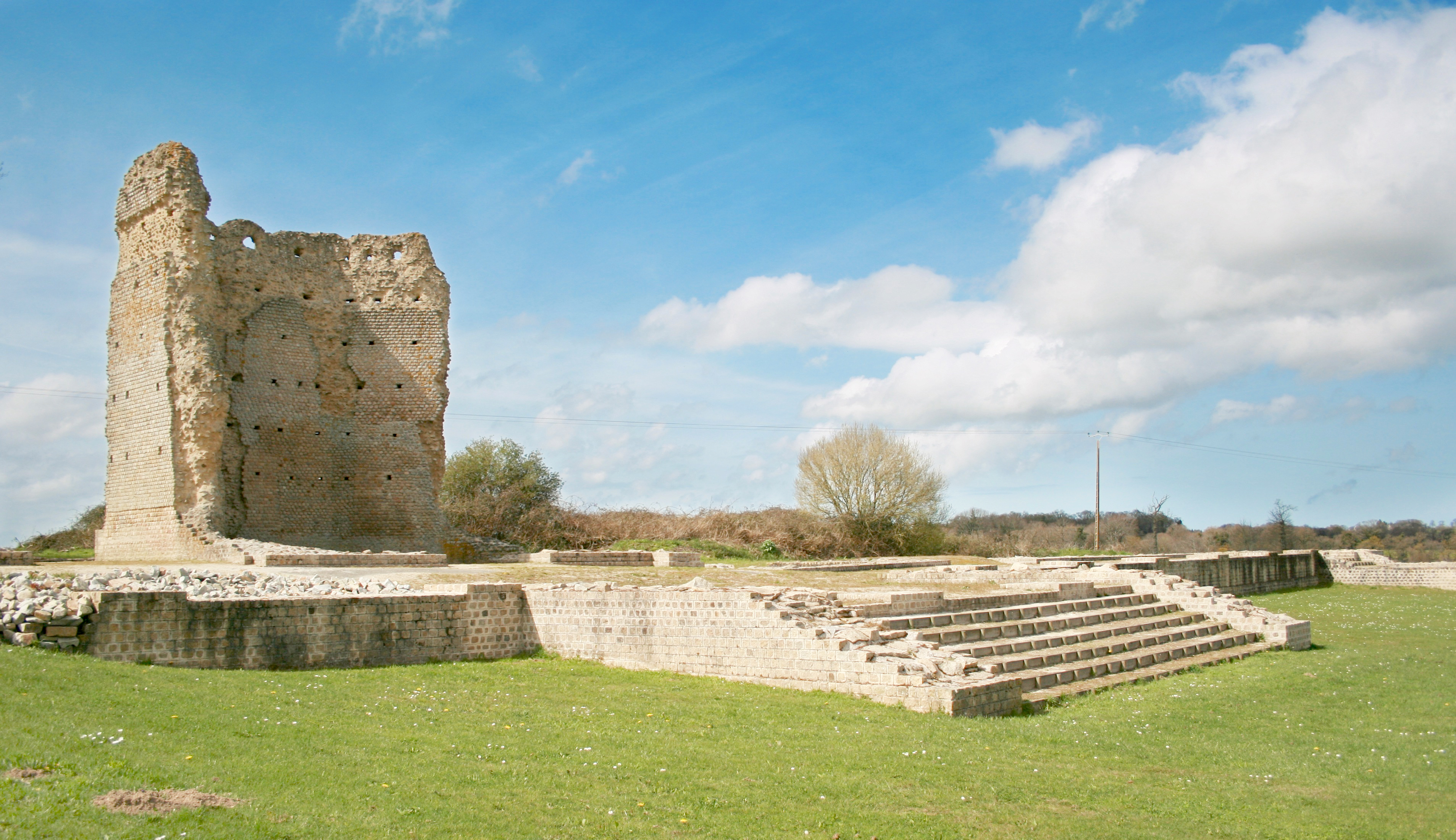
Temple of Mars (Corseul)

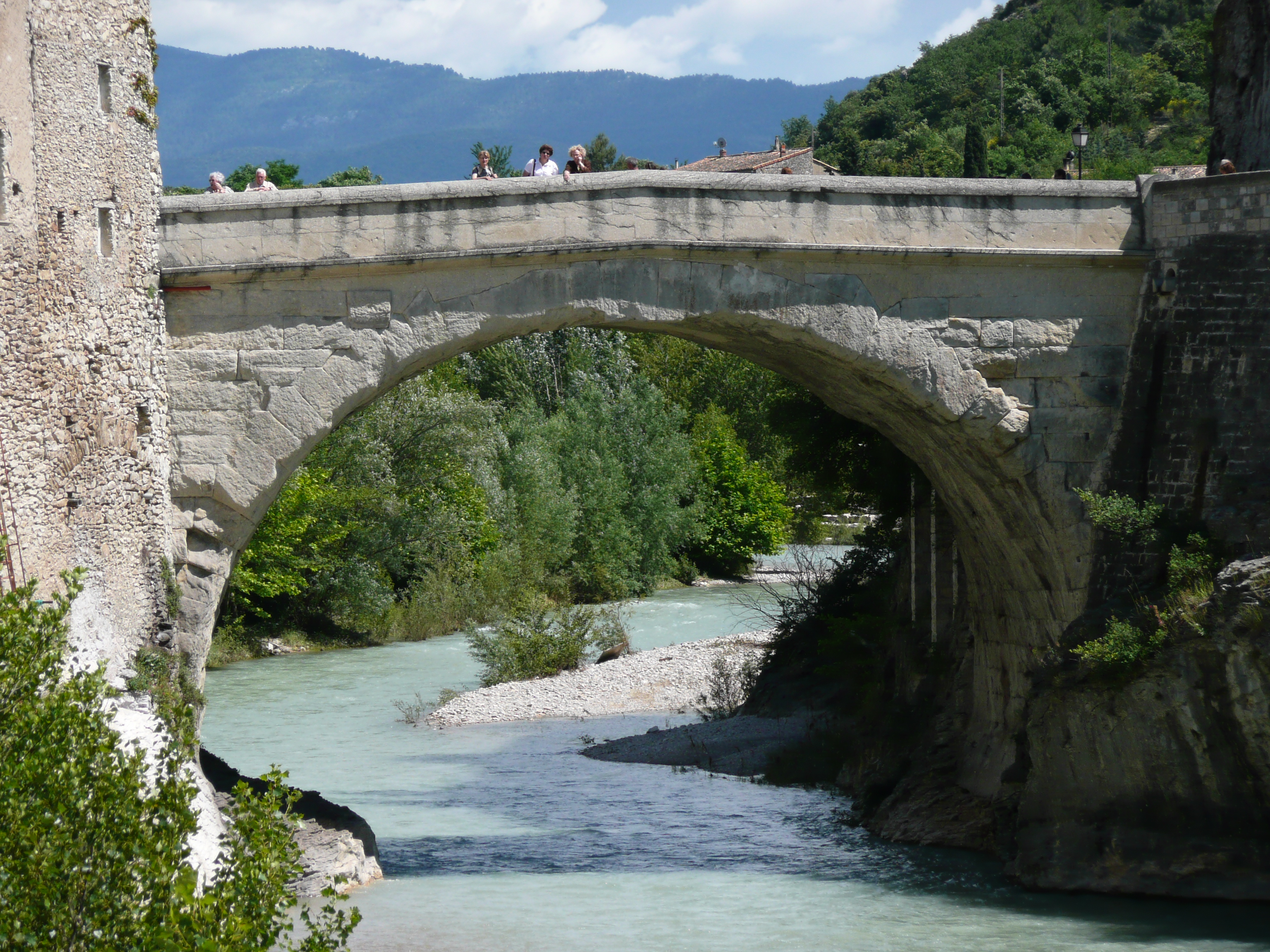
Roman bridge at Vaison-la-Romaine

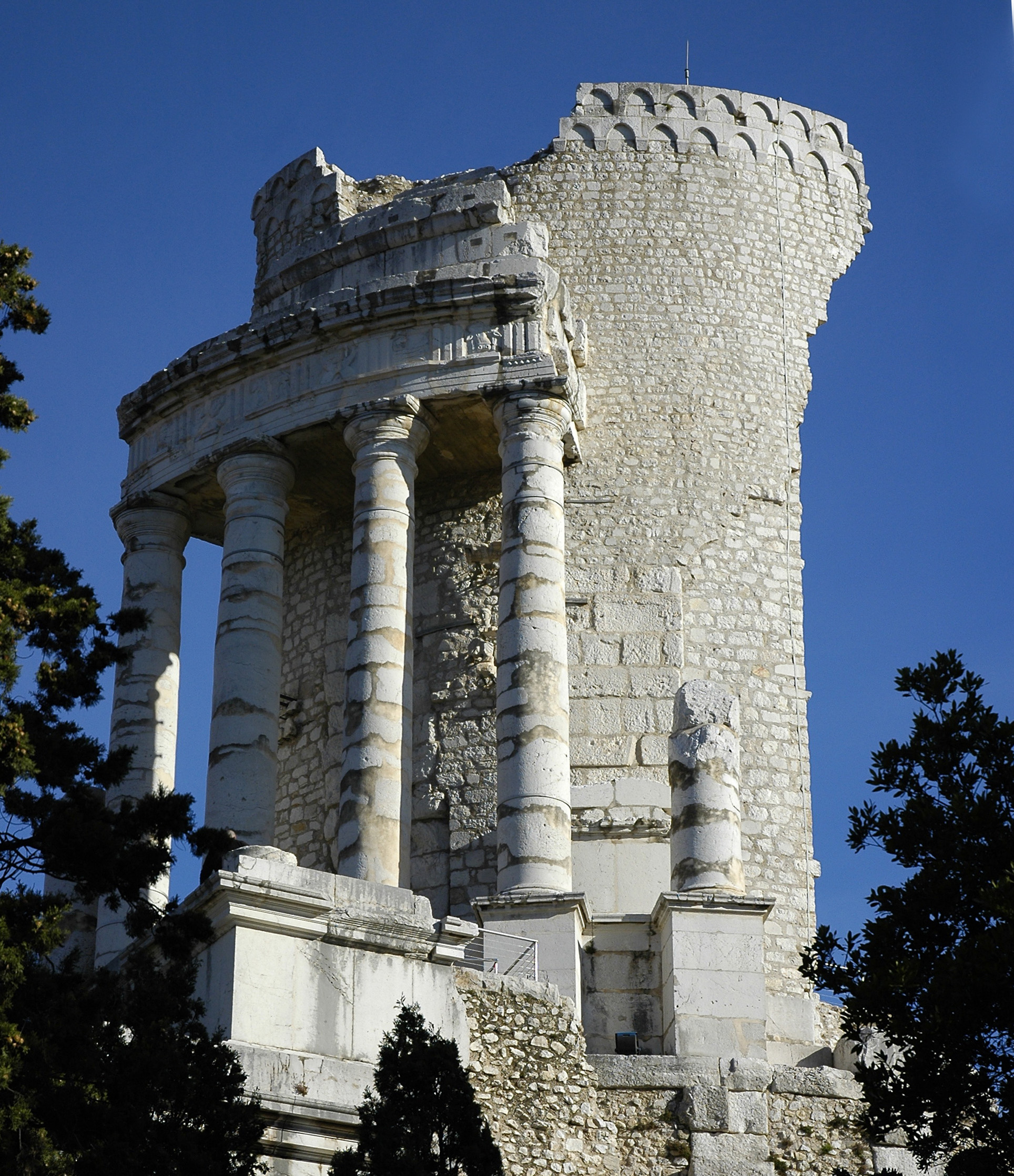
The Tropaeum Alpium, near Monaco

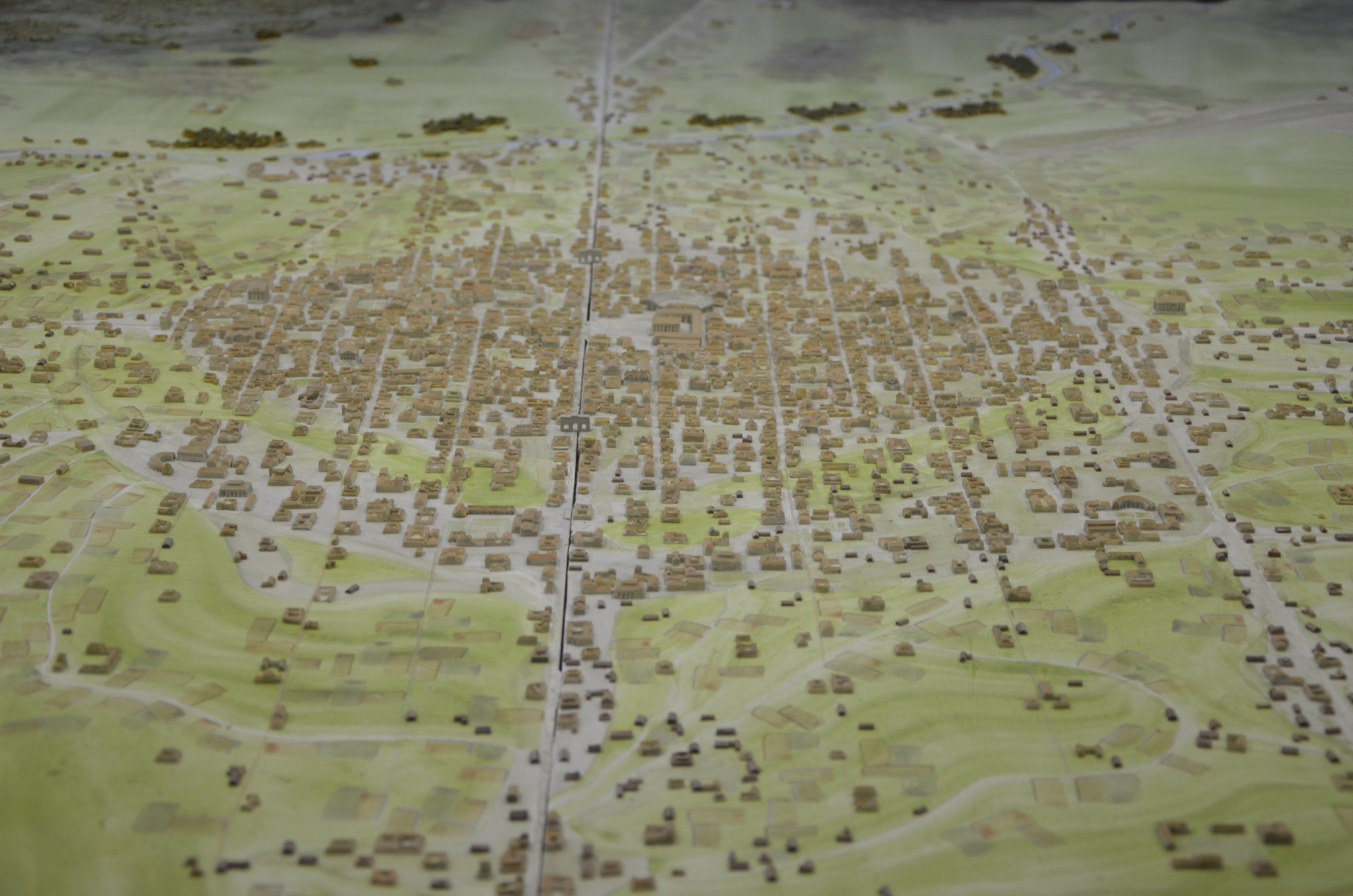
Model of Durocortorum (Reims)

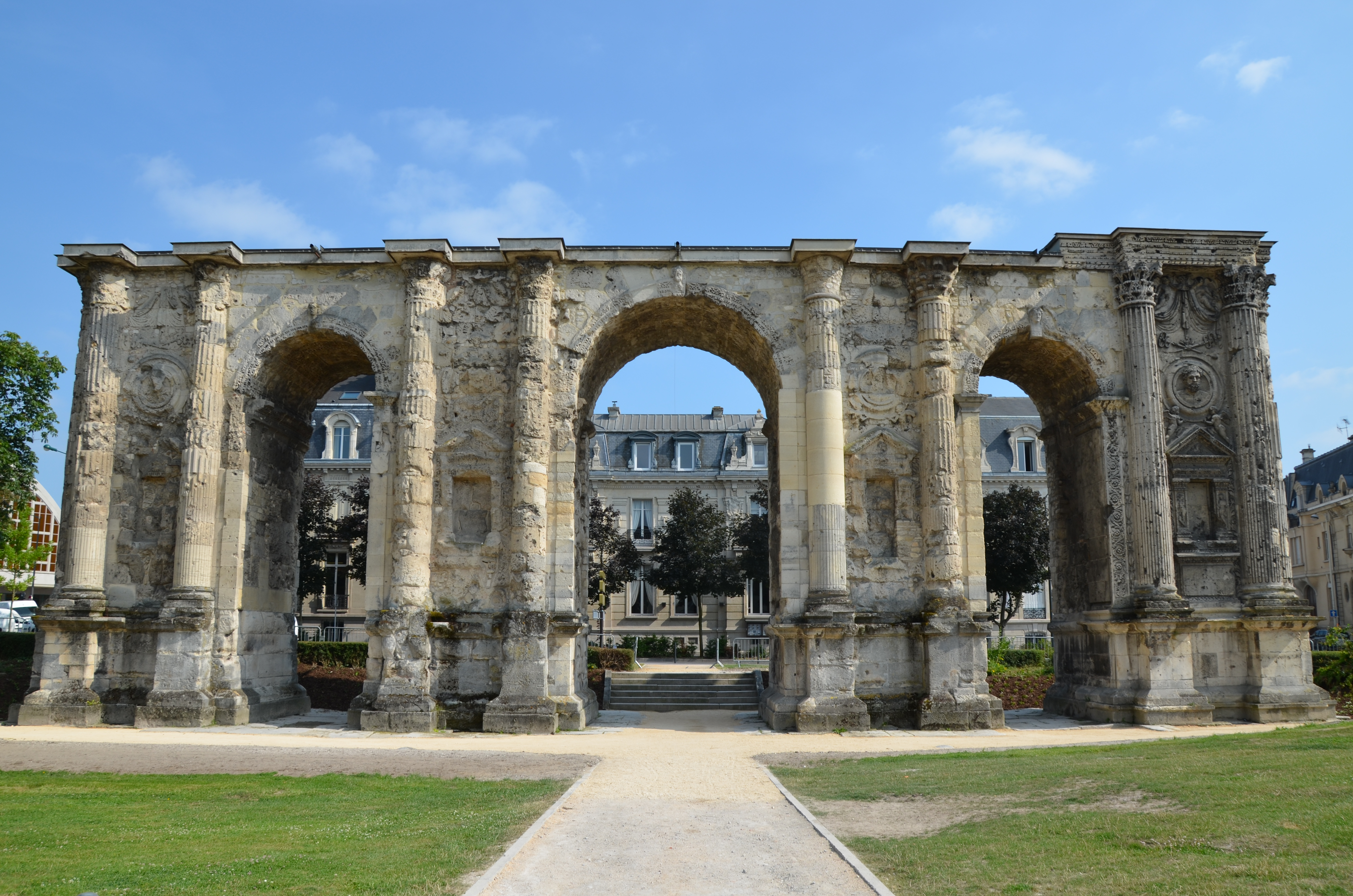
Porte de Mars, Reims

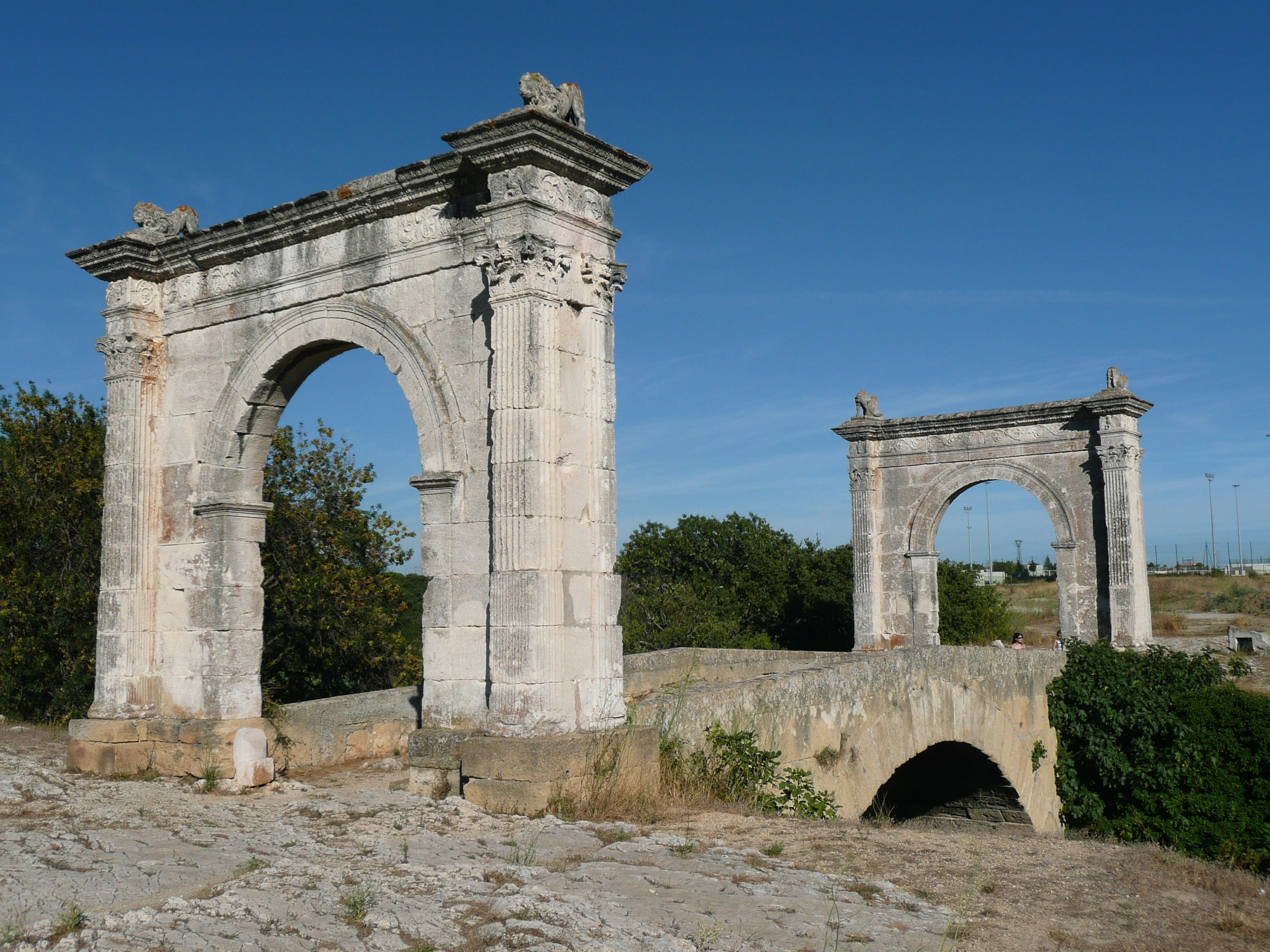
Pont Flavien, Saint-Chamas

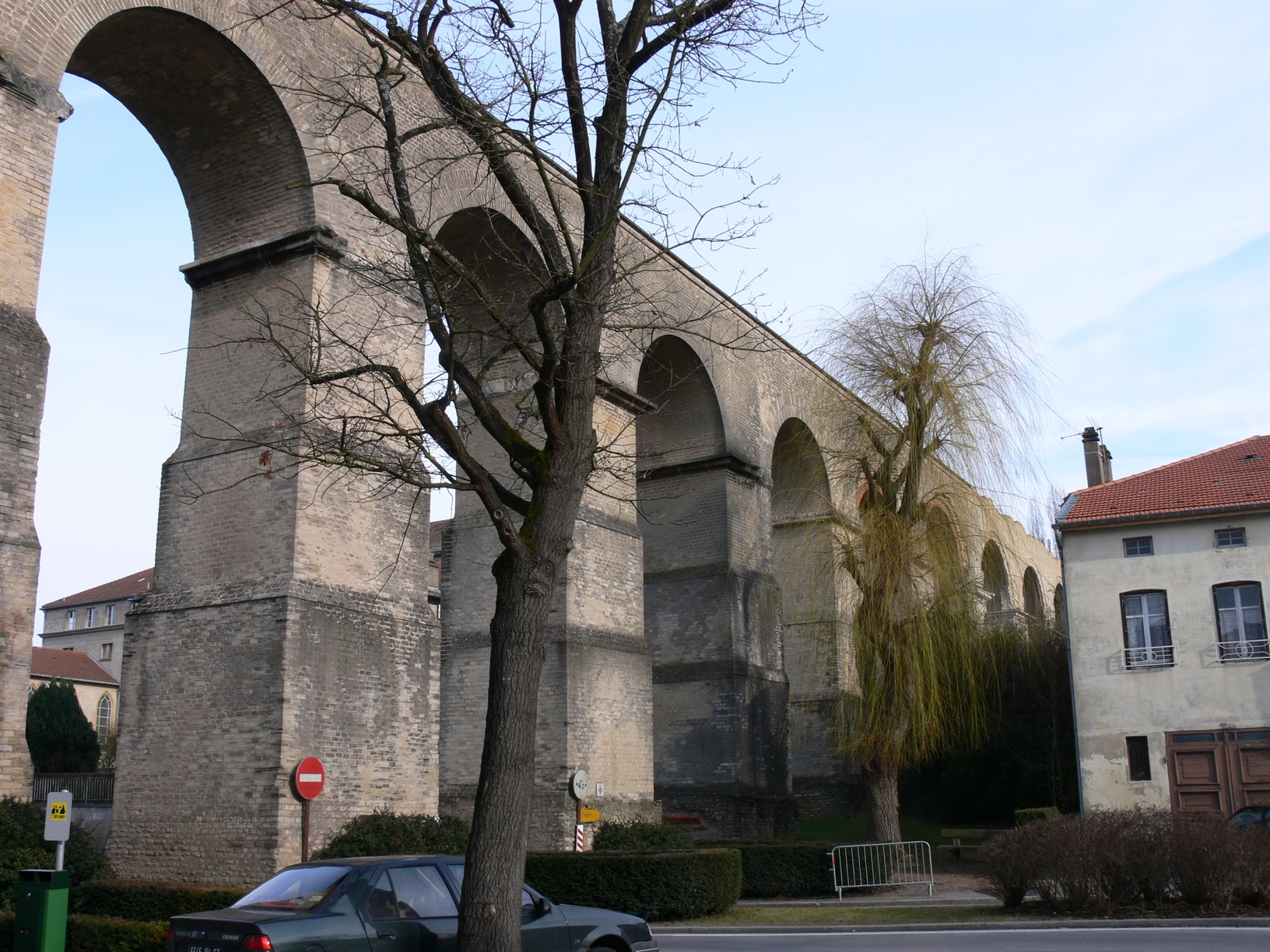
Roman aqueduct in Metz (Divodurum)

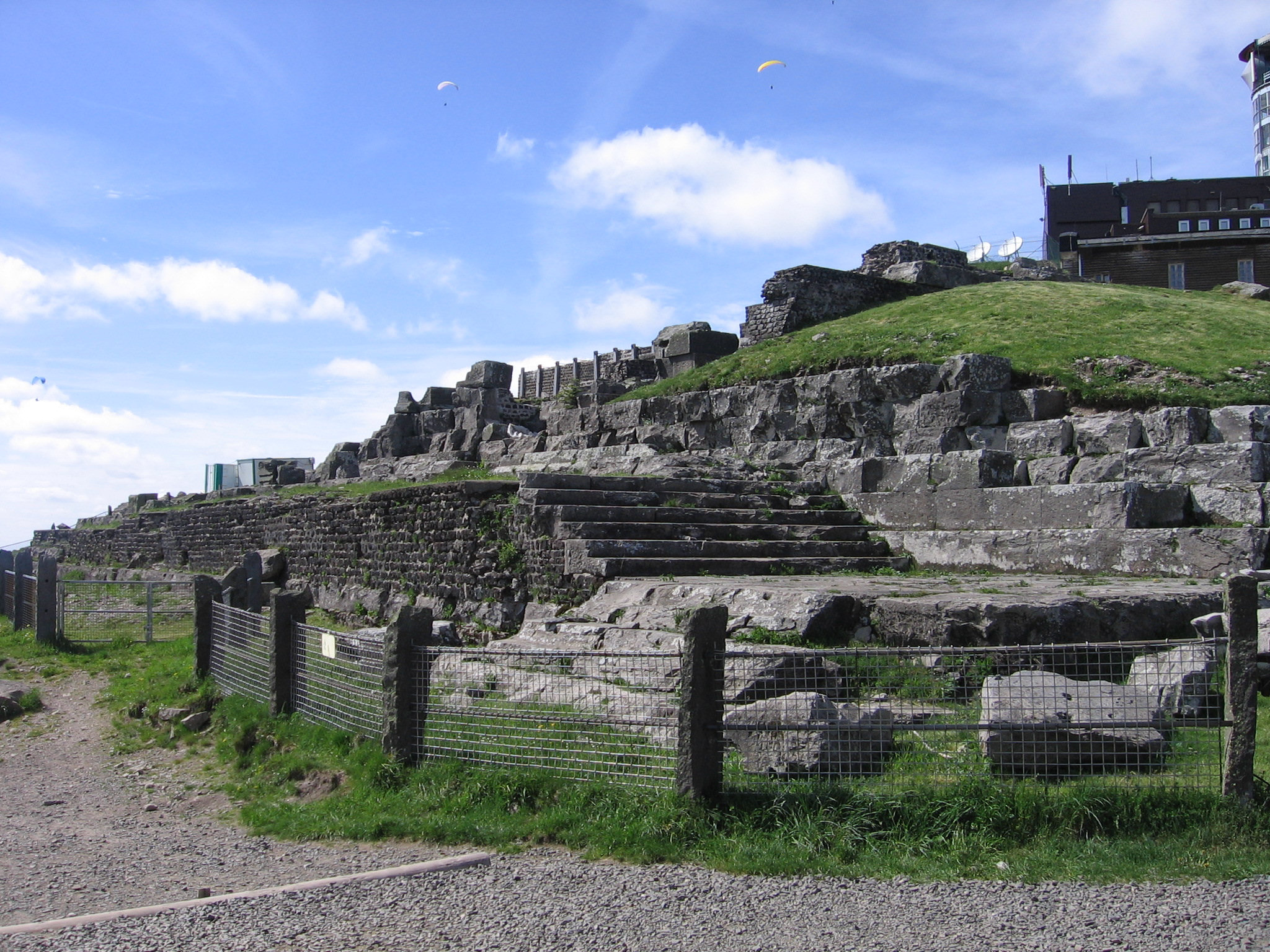
The Temple of Mercury, Puy de Dôme, France

== See also ==
- Germanisation of Gaul
- Greeks in pre-Roman Gaul
- Montmaurin
- Praetorian prefecture of Gaul
- Gallo-Roman religion
- Jublains archeological site
- Marble of Thorigny
