= Bassel Khartabil =

Syrian political prisoner (1981–2015)

- باسل خرطبيل
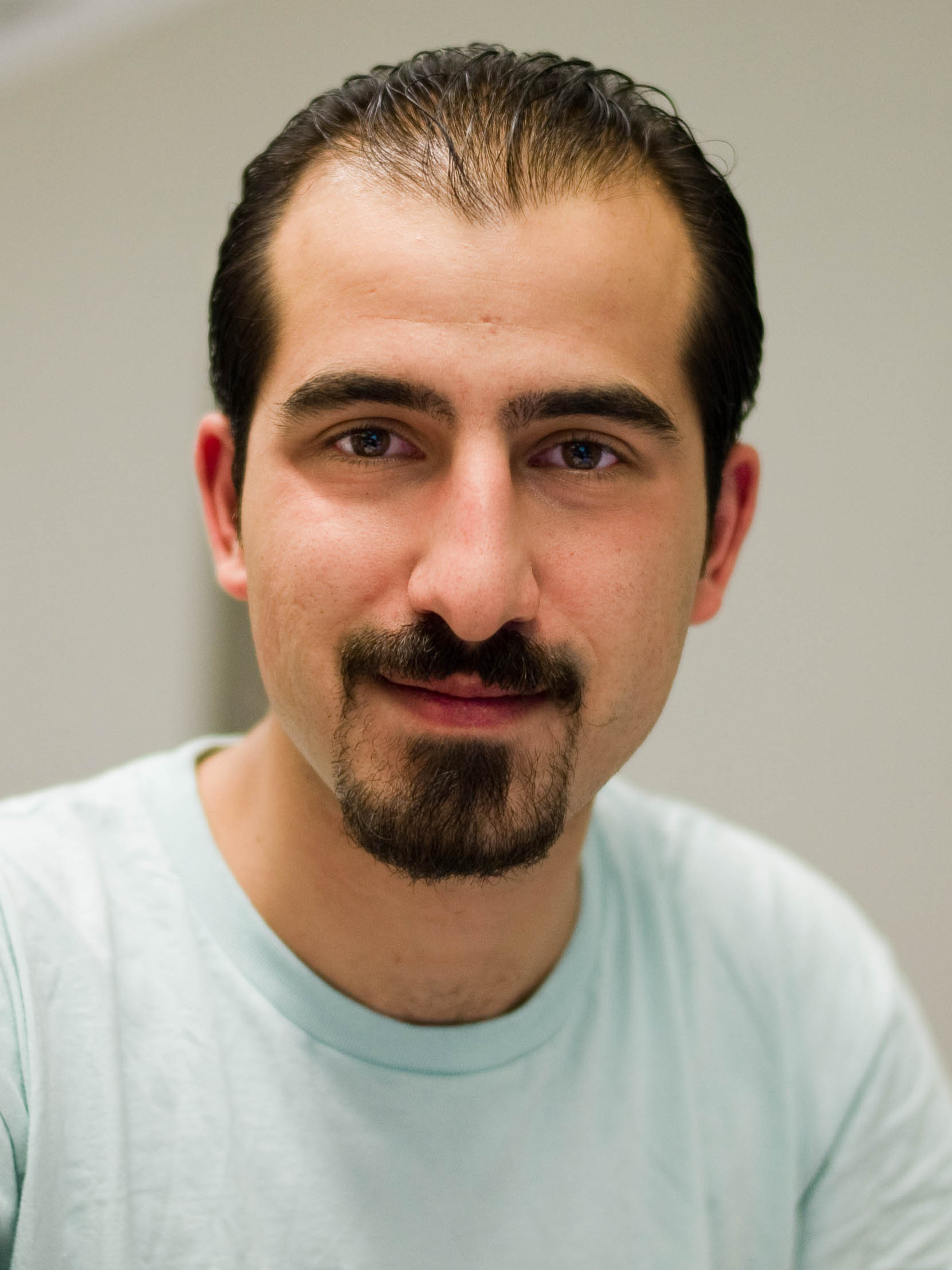
- Khartabil in June 2010
- Born: 22 May 1981; Damascus, Syria
- Died: 3 October 2015 (aged 34); Adra Prison, Syria
- Cause of death: Executed by the Syrian Arab Republic
- Occupation: Software engineer
- Known for: Aiki Framework, Openclipart, Mozilla, Creative Commons
- Spouse: Noura Ghazi (m. 2013)
- Awards: Index on Censorship 2013 Digital Freedom Award

Bassel Khartabil (Arabic: باسل خرطبيل; 22 May 1981 – 3 October 2015), also known as Bassel Safadi (باسل صفدي), was a Palestinian-Syrian open-source software developer. He was detained without trial by the Syrian government in 2012 and was secretly executed in 2015. Human rights organizations say that he was detained for his activities in support of freedom of expression, and the United Nations Working Group on Arbitrary Detention considered his detention to have been arbitrary.

Khartabil was born in Damascus to a Palestinian father and a Syrian mother, and was raised in Syria, where he specialized in open source software development. He was chief technology officer (CTO) and co-founder of collaborative research company Aiki Lab and was CTO of Al-Aous, a publishing and research institution dedicated to archaeological sciences and arts in Syria. He served as project lead and public affiliate for Creative Commons Syria, and contributed to Mozilla Firefox, Wikipedia, and Openclipart. He is credited with "opening up the Internet in Syria and vastly extending online access and knowledge to the Syrian people."

His last work included an open, 3D virtual reconstruction of the ancient city of Palmyra in Syria, with real time visualization using the web programming framework Aiki Framework. This was later created and displayed in his honor.

In 2018, the Bassel Khartabil Free Culture Fellowship was announced in Khartabil's memory. The fellowship awards $50,000 and additional support to individuals developing open culture in their communities. The fellowship was created by Creative Commons, Fabricatorz Foundation, Jimmy Wales Foundation, Mozilla, #NEWPALMYRA, and Wikimedia.

== Personal life ==
Khartabil was arrested a few days before his marriage contract to Noura Ghazi, a lawyer and human rights activist, was to be signed. The contract was finalized later that year, while Khartabil was in prison. The couple first met in Douma in April 2011 after coming back from a demonstration.

On Valentine's Day 2015, Ghazi made public a love letter she wrote to Khartabil, where she reflects on what has taken place in Syria in the time he had been imprisoned:

Bassel, I am very afraid, I am afraid about the country that is being slaughtered, divided, bleeding, being destroyed.. Ouch Bassel, I am very afraid that our dream is changing from seeing ourselves being the generation freeing their country to the one witnessing its destruction. Ouch Bassel, I am very afraid …

— Noura Ghazi, A Love Letter to Jailed Syrian-Palestinian Bassel Khartabil

His father was a scholar who wrote about atheism and Bassel himself was an atheist.

== Awards ==
For its 2012 list of Top Global Thinkers, Foreign Policy named Khartabil together with Rima Dali as #19 for "insisting, against all odds, on a peaceful Syrian revolution."

On 21 March 2013, Khartabil was awarded Index on Censorship's Digital Freedom Award. Although still detained at the time in Adra Prison, Khartabil was able to communicate his gratitude through Dana Trometer and Jon Phillips receiving the award on his behalf, wherein he paid "respect to all the victims of the struggle for freedom of speech, and, especially for those non-violent youths who refused to carry arms and deserve all the credit for this award."

== Life and work ==
Khartabil was chief technology officer (CTO) and co-founder of collaborative research company Aiki Lab, which produced the web programming framework Aiki Framework. This was used to let multiple people collaborate on building other projects such as the sites for Openclipart and the Open Font Library. He also contributed to the Fabricatorz project and the Sharism movement.

He also served as the CTO of Al-Aous, a publishing and research institution dedicated to archaeological sciences and arts in Syria. His last works included an open, 3D virtual reconstruction of the ancient city of Palmyra, with real time visualization of the models. An international community came together to contribute to the Palmyra project.

He was the country project lead and public affiliate for Creative Commons Syria, and contributed to Mozilla Firefox and Wikipedia. He is credited with opening up the Internet in Syria and working to improve access to knowledge across the country. It is believed that this work is what led to his later imprisonment.

== Imprisonment ==
On 15 March 2012, Khartabil was detained amid arrests in the Mazzeh district of Damascus by Military Security Branch 215. That day marked the one-year anniversary of the Syrian uprising, with pro- and anti-government protesters demonstrating in Damascus and elsewhere in the country.

Khartabil was interrogated and allegedly tortured for five days by Military Branch 215. One week after his arrest, security forces reportedly took him to his home where they confiscated his computers and his files. He was then transferred to the Interrogation Division Branch 248 and detained there incommunicado for 9 months. On 9 December 2012, Khartabil was brought before a military prosecutor who charged him with "spying for an enemy State" under Articles 272 and 274 of the Syrian Criminal Code. Khartabil was then sent to the Adra Prison in Damascus.

On 12 December 2013, a request for written answer on the question of Khartabil's imprisonment was raised before the European Parliament to the Commission (Vice-President/High Representative), stating that "his voluntary work, always non-violent in nature, was greatly valued by Syrians of all backgrounds, and it is strongly suspected that his arrest was part of an effort to restrict access to online communities and discourses and stifle free expression in Syria". On 18 March 2014, the written answer from High Representative/Vice-President Catherine Ashton was published, stating that "The HR/VP deplores the ongoing imprisonment of Bassel Safadi Khartabil, shares the concerns at his situation and follows it very closely".

On 21 April 2015, the United Nations Working Group on Arbitrary Detention (WGAD) adopted an opinion on Khartabil's case, calling his detention "arbitrary" and asking for his immediate release. The WGAD concluded that Khartabil's detention violated Articles 9, 14 and 19 of the International Covenant on Civil and Political Rights (ICCPR), which Syria ratified in 1969.

=== Prison paintings ===
While Khartabil was in prison he made paintings, four of which were smuggled out.

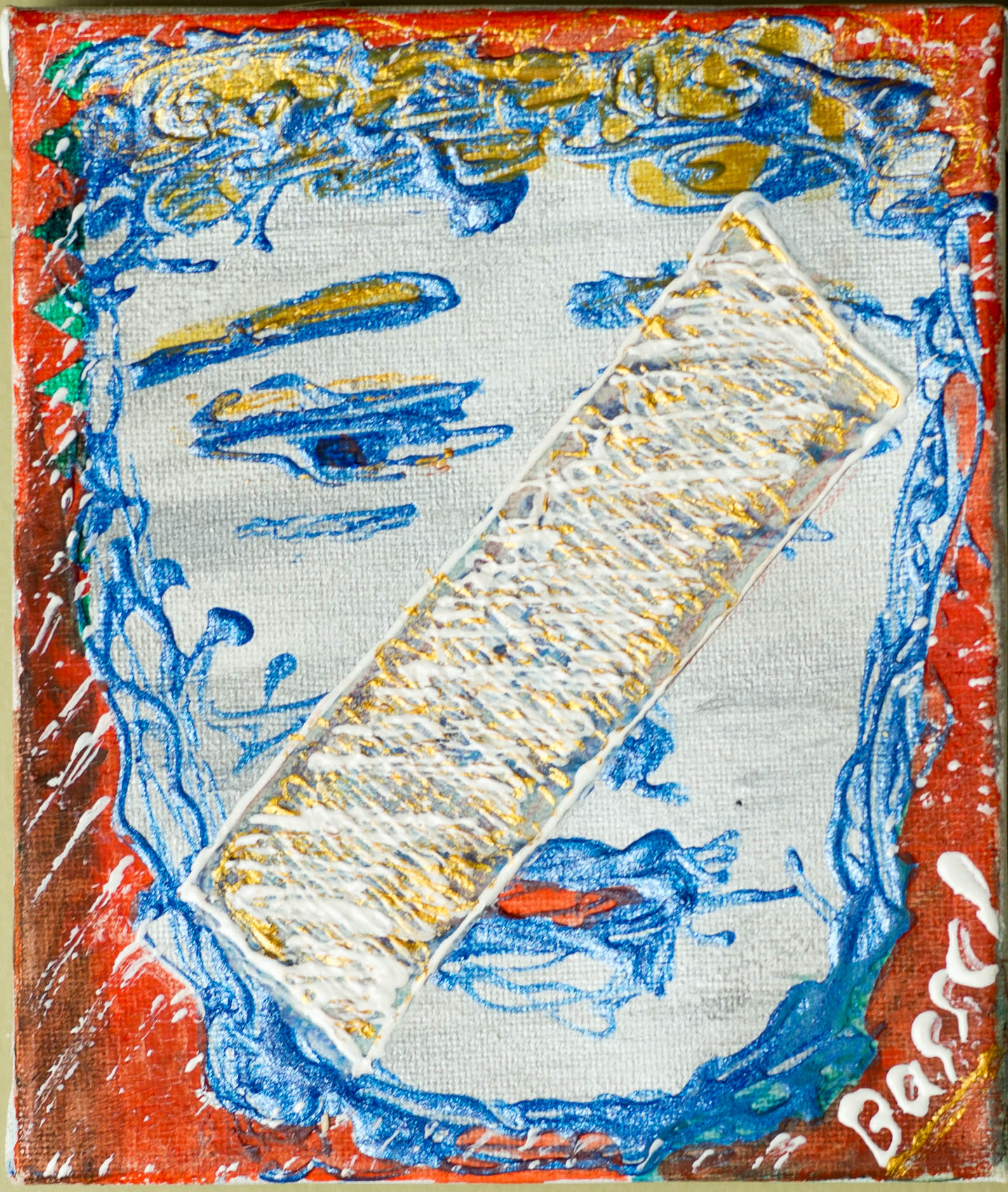
17 June 2015, Damascus Central Jail. "An attempt to draw a stereotype. This is the stereotype I have in mind for the deformed souls, I have to deal with every day at jail. There are a lot of them."

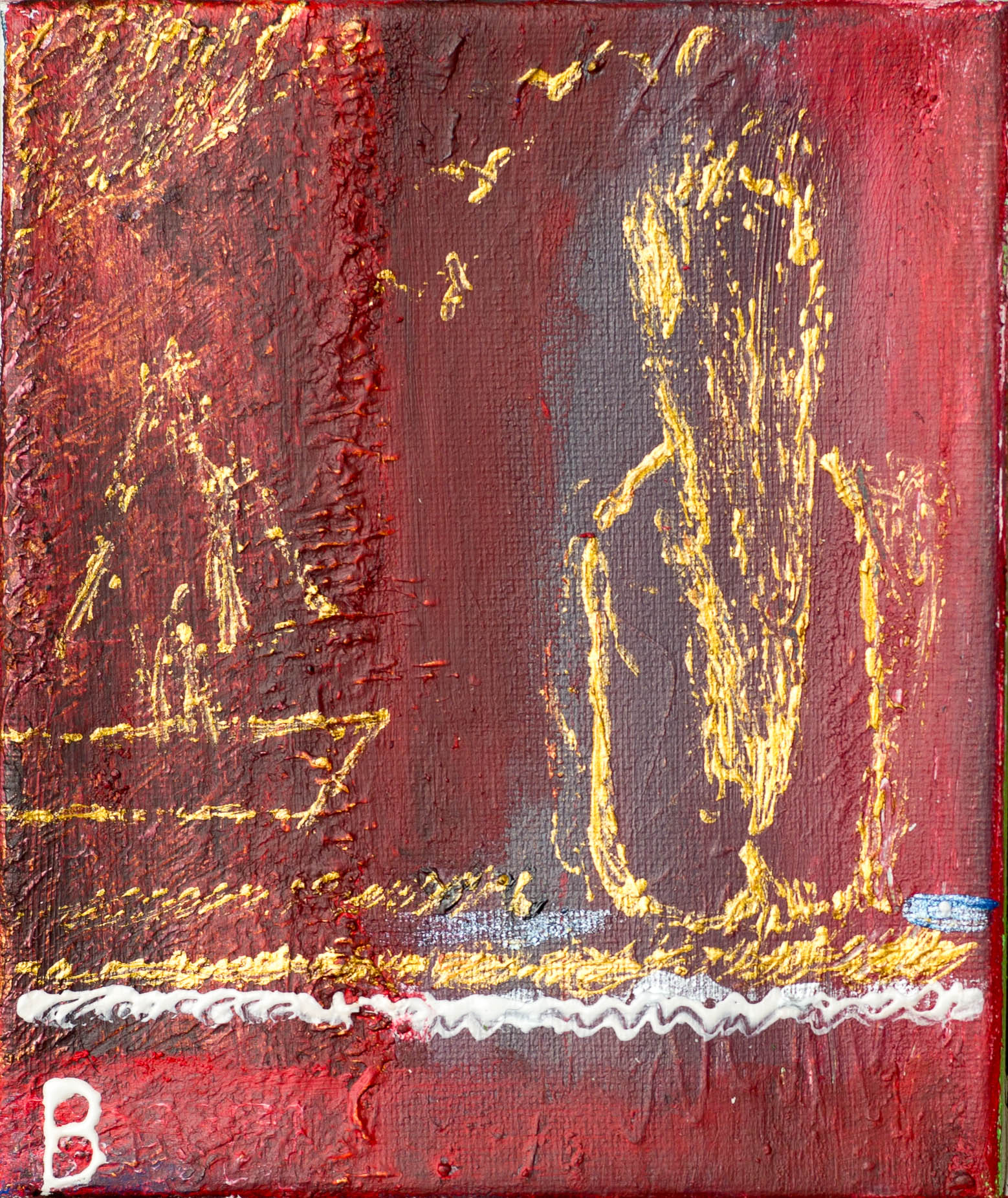
10 July 2015, Damascus Central Jail. "From time to time I resurrect old black and white dreams from my childhood memories."

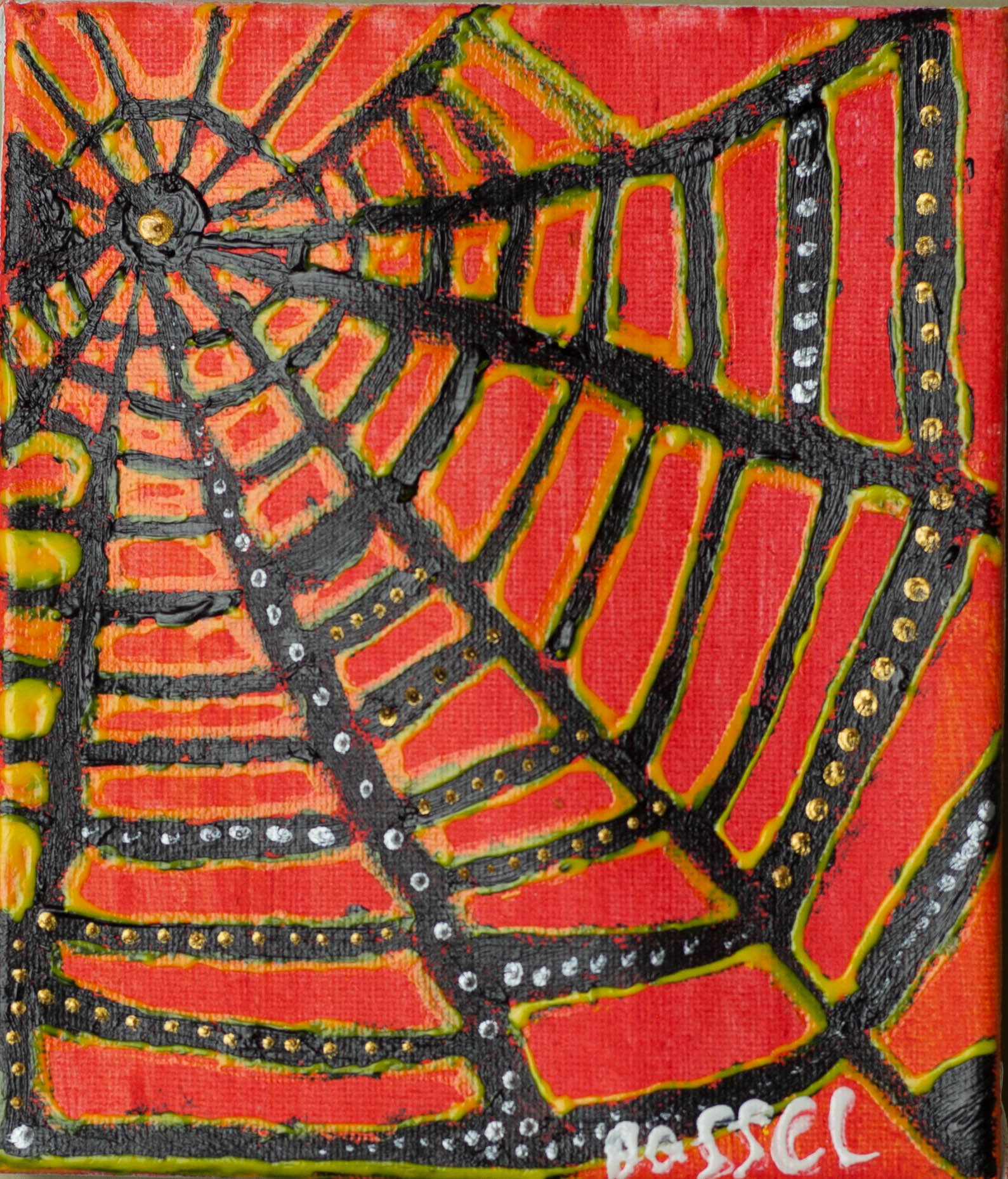
15 June 2015, Damascus Central Jail. "What is this dream I see every night? A web? Black lines? A tunnel? Or some memories from my childhood?"

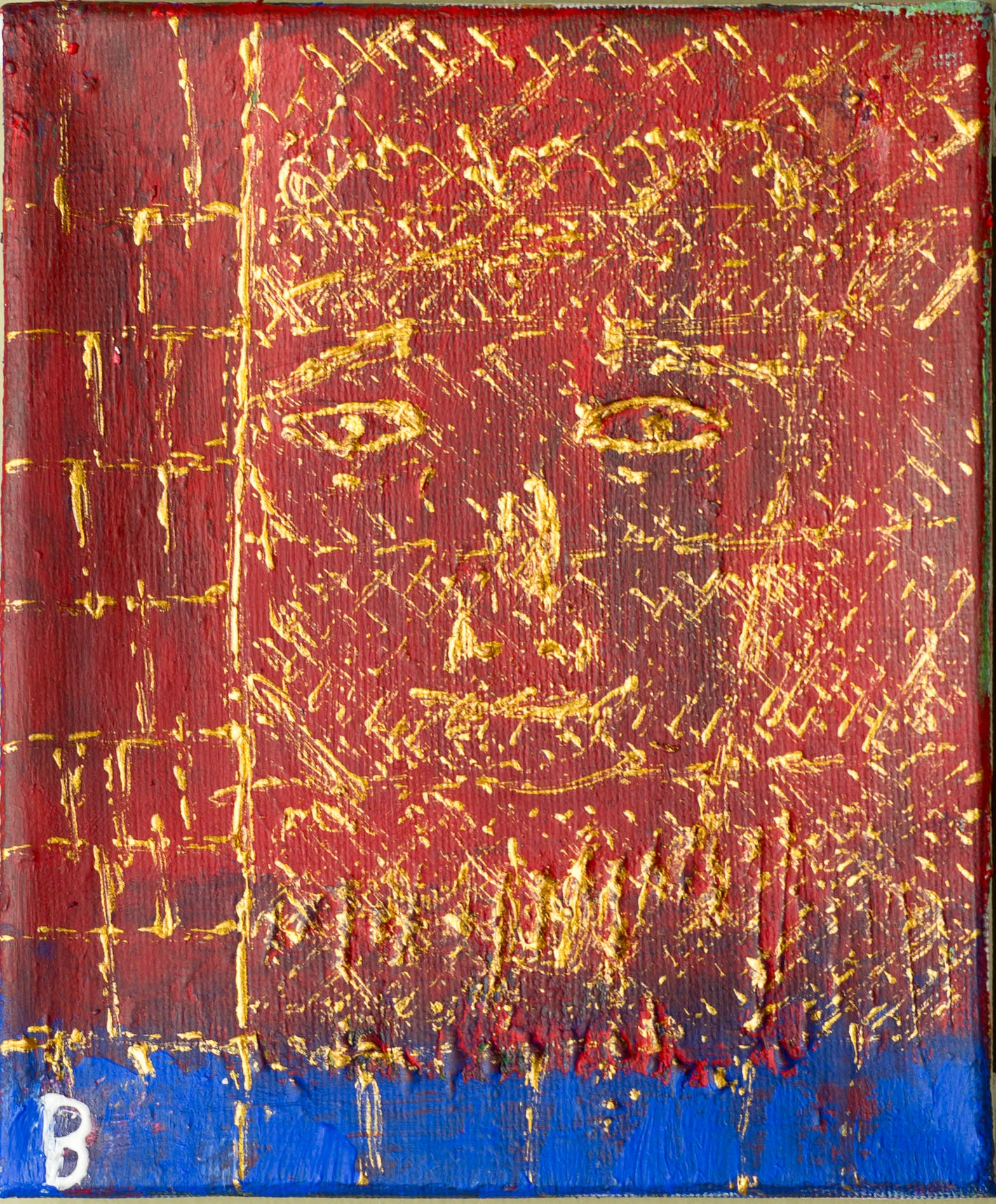
11 July 2015, Damascus Central Jail. "an uneasy or anxious feeling..."

=== #FREEBASSEL campaign ===
After his detention became widely known in early July 2012, a global campaign was launched calling for his immediate release. Notable Internet companies like Mozilla, Wikipedia, Global Voices, EFF and Creative Commons wrote letters to the Syrian government urging his immediate release. Notable individuals including Lawrence Lessig, Joi Ito, Mitchell Baker, Jillian York, Mohamed Nanabhay and Barry Threw wrote public letters of support. Al Jazeera, Framablog, and Hacker News wrote about the effort.

In October 2012, Amnesty International released a document with information suggesting that Khartabil has been ill-treated and even tortured. On 23 October, the Taiwan chapter of Amnesty International led a letter-writing event at Insomnia Cafe to raise awareness about Khartabil in Taipei, Taiwan. On 26 November, he was named one of the top 100 global thinkers by Foreign Policy for his resistance.

In December, he was moved to a military prison to await a military trial. In response, a fasting campaign was launched to raise awareness about Khartabil's deteriorating incarceration situation. On 25 January 2013, reports circulated about the pending trial and fears of his execution. On 15 March the #FREEBASSEL project organized a #FREEBASSELDAY campaign with Creative Commons, Mozilla, and other community leaders, leading to public artworks, meetups, press, and videos.

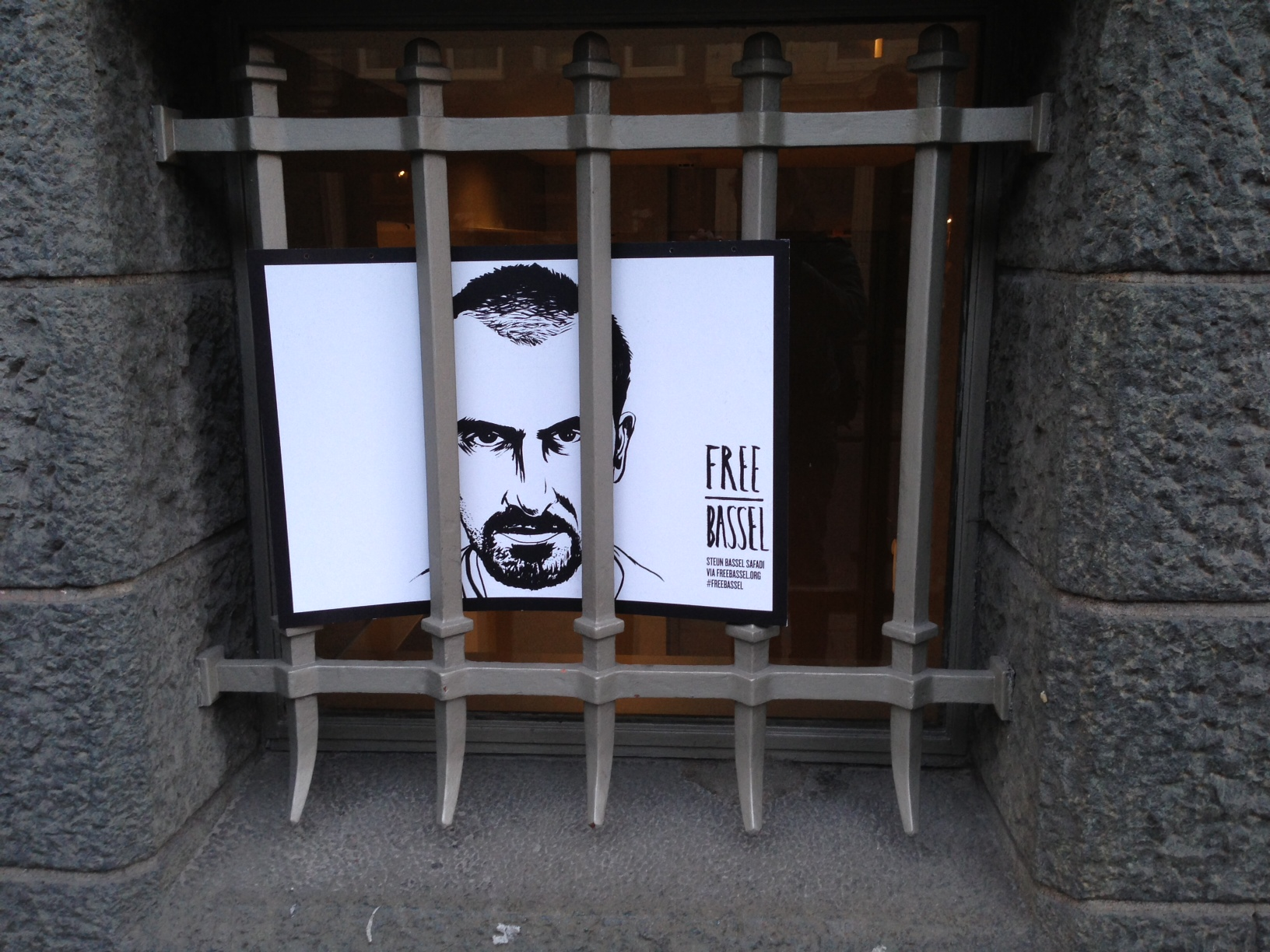
Poster of the #FREEBASSEL campaign

On 22 May, commemorating Khartabil's 32nd birthday—the second time he spent a birthday in prison as well as the 799th day of the Syrian conflict—the Index on Censorship, Creative Commons, and the #FREEBASSEL campaign launched Project Sunlight, to uncover more information about Khartabil's condition and location. His mother wrote, "I just want him free, I pray for him to be free and I pray for all his friends who believe and work on Bassel's freedom."

At the Index on Censorship Awards, Jon Phillips said of Khartabil,

Locking up Bassel only locks out his personal freedom. By locking up Bassel, his Syrian captors are accidentally locking out themselves from the future...thousands of people that Bassel's work helped, now help him by spreading the message #FREEBASSEL. This is what truly builds Syria and connects it to the global connected future. This award proves that his lock-up, is NOT a lock-out of his digital freedom.

A letter supporting him was sent to the European Union Parliament later that year.

In 2014, Marc Weidenbaum gathered participants to create 38 musical pieces that might be used as a soundscape for an immersive, completed digital visualization of ancient Palmyra. A second iteration of #FREEBASSELDAY involved a Wikipedia "edit-a-thon", meetups, the creation of a cookbook in Khartabil's honor, and press mentions.

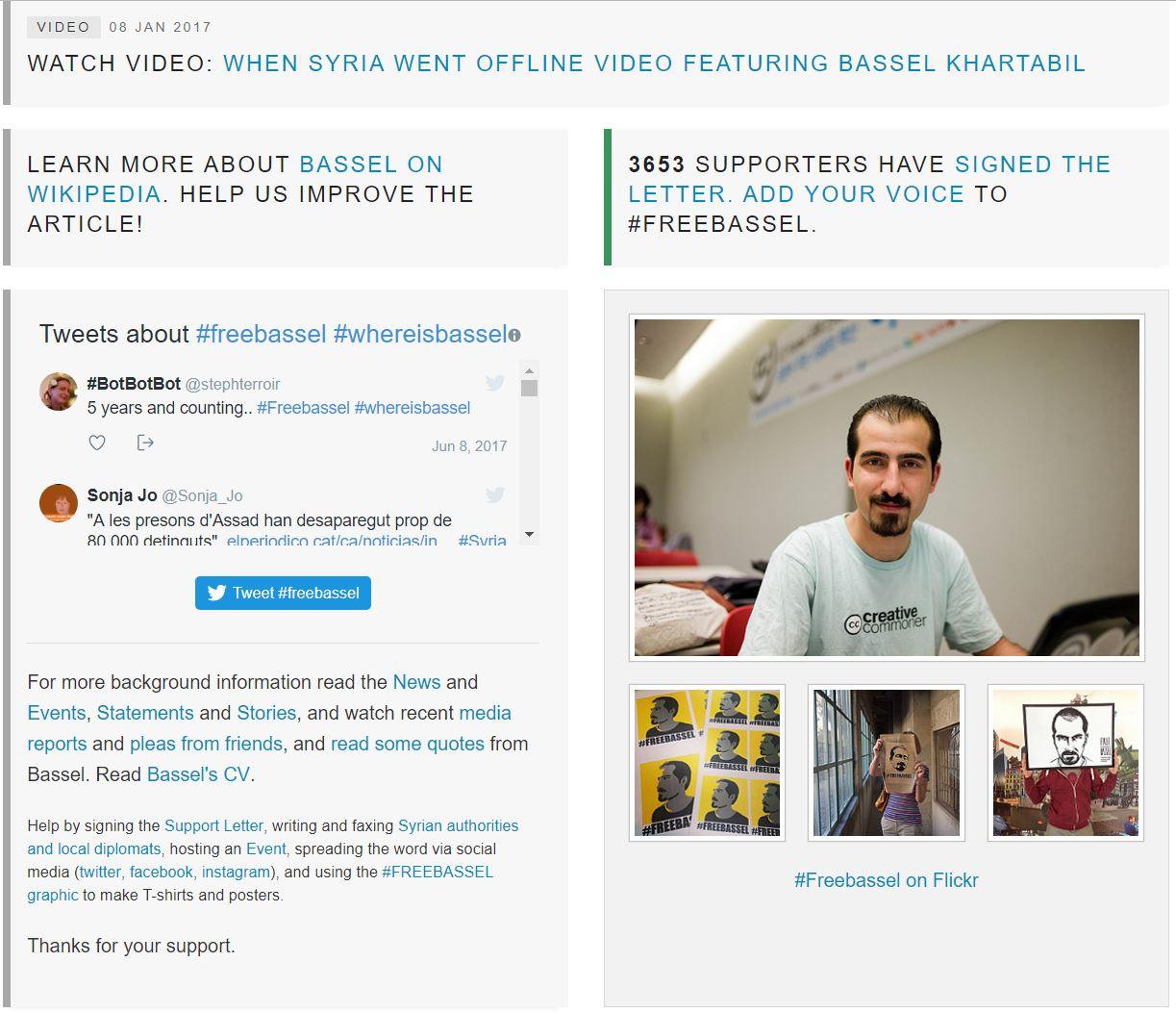
The Free Bassel website as of January 2017

Rebecca MacKinnon wrote about Khartabil and the Zone 9 Bloggers in the World Policy Journal, and Wikipedia hosted an editathon for Zone 9 bloggers. On Human Rights Day, Global Voices led a campaign to raise awareness about his imprisonment.

In March 2015, the Electronic Frontier Foundation hosted a Wikipedia edit-a-thon for #FREEBASSELDAY. In addition, the Creative Commons Arab World organized a virtual Arabic Wikipedia edit-a-thon to translate and expand pages related to Khartabil and his interests. He was later profiled with the launch of the EFF's Offline project, "sharing the stories of imprisoned technologists and technology users."

In 2017, the #FREEBASSEL campaign asked supporters to do five public acts in honor of Khartabil, to be posted on social media.

=== Transfer and execution ===
On 12 September 2015, Jaysh al-Islam shelled and stormed the prison, taking control of two buildings. Until early October, Khartabil was still in Adra Prison in the suburbs of Damascus, Syria. By 3 October, military police took him from his cell in Adra with a 'top secret' sealed order from the Military Field Court. He was transferred to an unknown location.

On 6 October, Amnesty International released a new report on Khartabil's status. A day later, Human Rights Watch and 30 other human rights organizations issued a letter demanding that Khartabil's whereabouts be disclosed. On 17 October, the Creative Commons Board of Directors approved a resolution calling for Khartabil's release. On 21 October, the New Palmyra project was launched to carry on his 3D modeling work and other creative uses of data about Palmyra. A day later, the MIT Media Lab offered Khartabil a position of research scientist at the Center for Civic Media to work with Ethan Zuckerman on projects to make Syria's history available to the world. On 9 November, an anthology of essays in Khartabil's honor, entitled The Cost of Freedom: A Collective Inquiry, was released under a Creative Commons public domain license. Two days afterward, unconfirmed rumors surfaced that Khartabil had been sentenced to death.

In August 2017, Khartabil's wife and friends reported they had seen a copy of official documents confirming he had been executed after his transfer from Adra prison in 2015.

=== Response ===
The Electronic Frontier Foundation and the Wikimedia Foundation as well as Global Voices released statements mourning his loss.

Creative Commons announced the creation of the Bassel Khartabil Memorial Fund, to support projects in line with his ideas and work throughout his life. On 11 August, the Mozilla Foundation announced the creation of the Bassel Khartabil Free Culture Fellowship, organized for an initial period of three years by Mozilla, Wikimedia Foundation, Creative Commons, the Jimmy Wales Foundation, #NEWPALMYRA and other groups. It is aimed at supporting individuals developing free culture, particularly under adverse circumstances.

Year	Fellow	Fellowship Goal
2020	Dr. Tarek Loubani and glia.org	Combat COVID-19
2018	Majd al-Shihabi	projects Palestine Open Maps and MASRAD:platform, an oral history archive

== Works ==
=== Models of ancient Palmyra ===
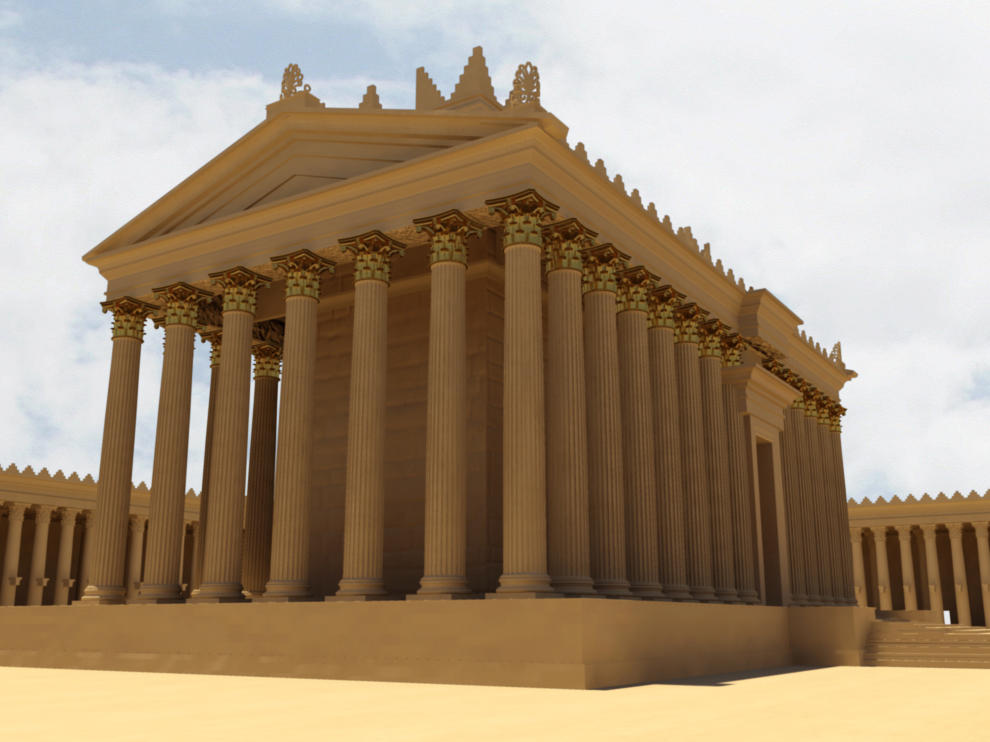
A digital reconstruction of the Temple of Bel from the New Palmyra project

Starting in 2005, Khartabil began collecting photographs of the ancient architecture and archaeology sites in Palmyra, in the hopes of reconstructing the city online, using 3D models and virtual spaces.

His efforts were put on hold when he was imprisoned, and some of his early work was lost. In 2015 his friends and colleagues launched the New Palmyra Project to bring that dream to life. Since then, many of the most famous structures in Palmyra have been modeled, and some life-size models built of structures that were destroyed in the Syrian Civil War.

As of 2017, most of the buildings and statues captured by the New Palmyra Project had been completely destroyed by ISIL.

=== Writing and art ===
Khartabil wrote hundreds of letters while in prison, including some while he was in a high-security military prison, where writing was prohibited. He also produced paintings and poetry. For a short time, he published some of his writing to an anonymous prison blog and Twitter account, via a friend.

Jail is not walls, not the executioner and guards. It is the hidden fear in our hearts that makes us prisoners. —Bassel

In his last year in prison, he made a series of at least four paintings that he was able to smuggle out to friends.

== See also ==
- List of Wikipedia people
