= Monumental Arch of Palmyra =

Monumental Arch
- قوس النصر
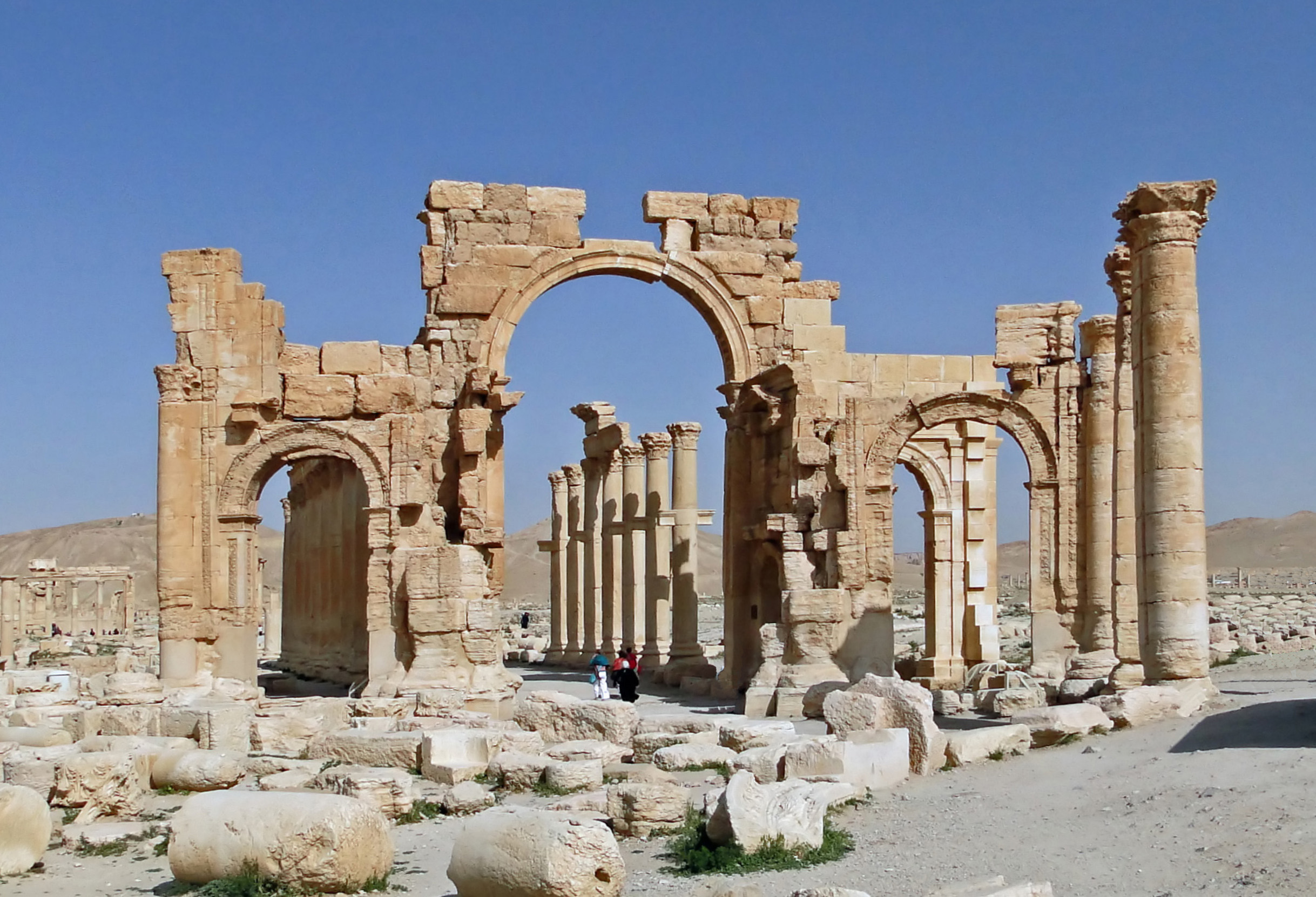
- Ruins of the Monumental Arch in 2010
- Interactive map of the Monumental Arch area
- Alternative names: Arch of Triumph; Arch of Septimius Severus

General information
- Status: Destroyed, some stonework survives
- Type: Ornamental arch
- Architectural style: Roman/Palmyrene
- Location: Palmyra, Syria
- Coordinates: 34°32′59.9″N 38°16′15.6″E
- Completed: 3rd century
- Destroyed: October 2015

UNESCO World Heritage Site
- Type: Cultural
- Criteria: i, ii, iv
- Designated: 1980 (4th session)
- Part of: Site of Palmyra
- Reference no.: 23
- Region: Arab States
- Endangered: 2013–present

The Monumental Arch, also called the Arch of Triumph (Arabic: قوس النصر) or the Arch of Septimius Severus, was an ornamental archway in Palmyra, Syria. It was built in the 3rd century during the reign of emperor Septimius Severus. Its ruins later became one of the main attractions of Palmyra until it was officially destroyed by the ISIS in 2015. Most of its stonework still survives and there are plans to rebuild it using anastylosis.

== History ==
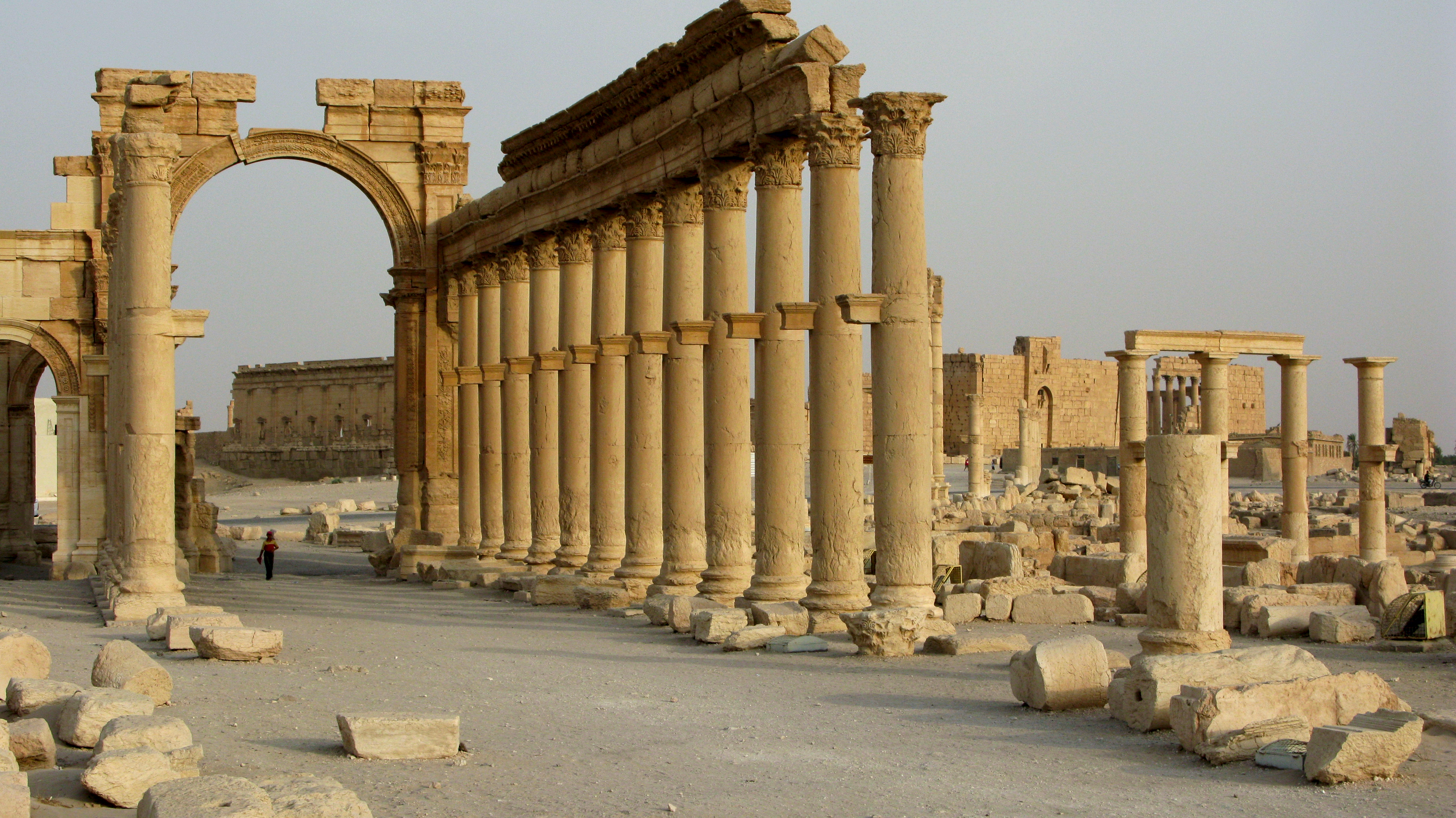
The Great Colonnade and the Monumental Arch

The Monumental Arch was built sometime during the reign of Emperor Septimius Severus, which lasted from 193 to 211 AD; it linked the main street of the Colonnade and the Temple of Bel. The arch was meant to integrate the southern and central parts of the Colonnade as its location marks a change of 30° in the orientation of the street between the Tetrapylon and the Temple of Bel, so to solve this problem the arch incorporated two façades angled apart from one another.

According to some sources, the structure was built as a triumphal arch to commemorate the Romans' victories over the Parthians. The structure was sometimes erroneously referred to as "Hadrian's Arch", although Emperor Hadrian had been dead for over half a century when the arch was built.

The ruins of the arch, along with other monuments in Palmyra, were depicted in engravings by the British traveller Robert Wood, which were published in London in 1753 under the title The ruins of Palmyra; otherwise Tedmor in the desart.

The Monumental Arch was restored in the 1930s. When the ruins of Palmyra became a tourist attraction in the 20th and early 21st centuries, the arch was one of the city's main sights.

== Architecture ==
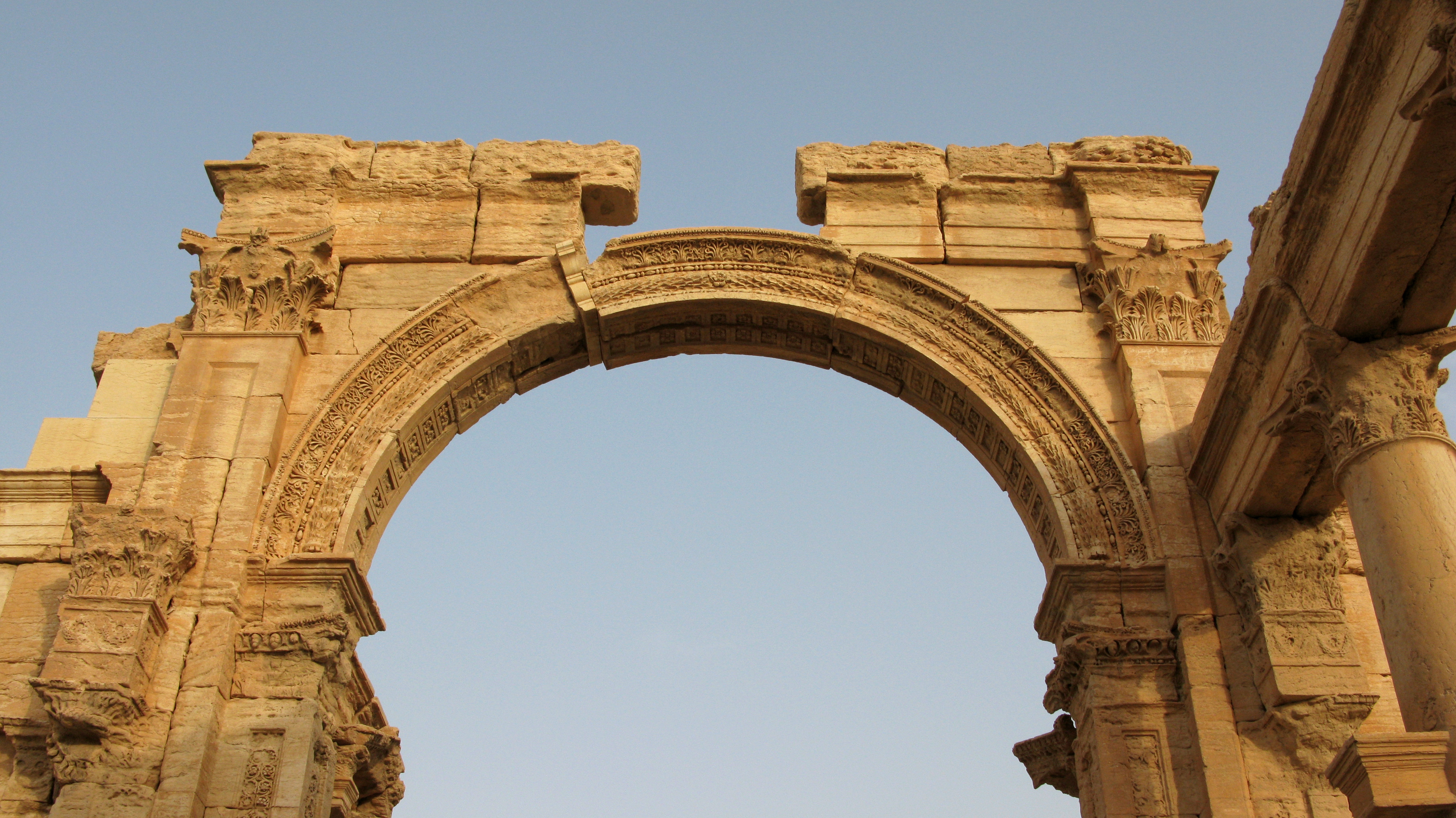
The Monumental Arch close-up

The Monumental Arch was unusual from an architectural viewpoint, since it had a double façade, masking a 30° bend between the eastern and central sections of the Great Colonnade. The arch consisted of a large gateway in the centre flanked by a smaller opening on either side.

The arch was decorated with ornate stone carvings, including reliefs depicting plants or geometrical designs. These were similar to those found on other arches built during Severus' reign elsewhere in the Roman Empire, such as at Leptis Magna in modern-day Libya. The reliefs on the arch were described by UNESCO as "an outstanding example of Palmyrene art," and they make it one of the most lavishly adorned monuments in the city.

== Destruction and restoration ==
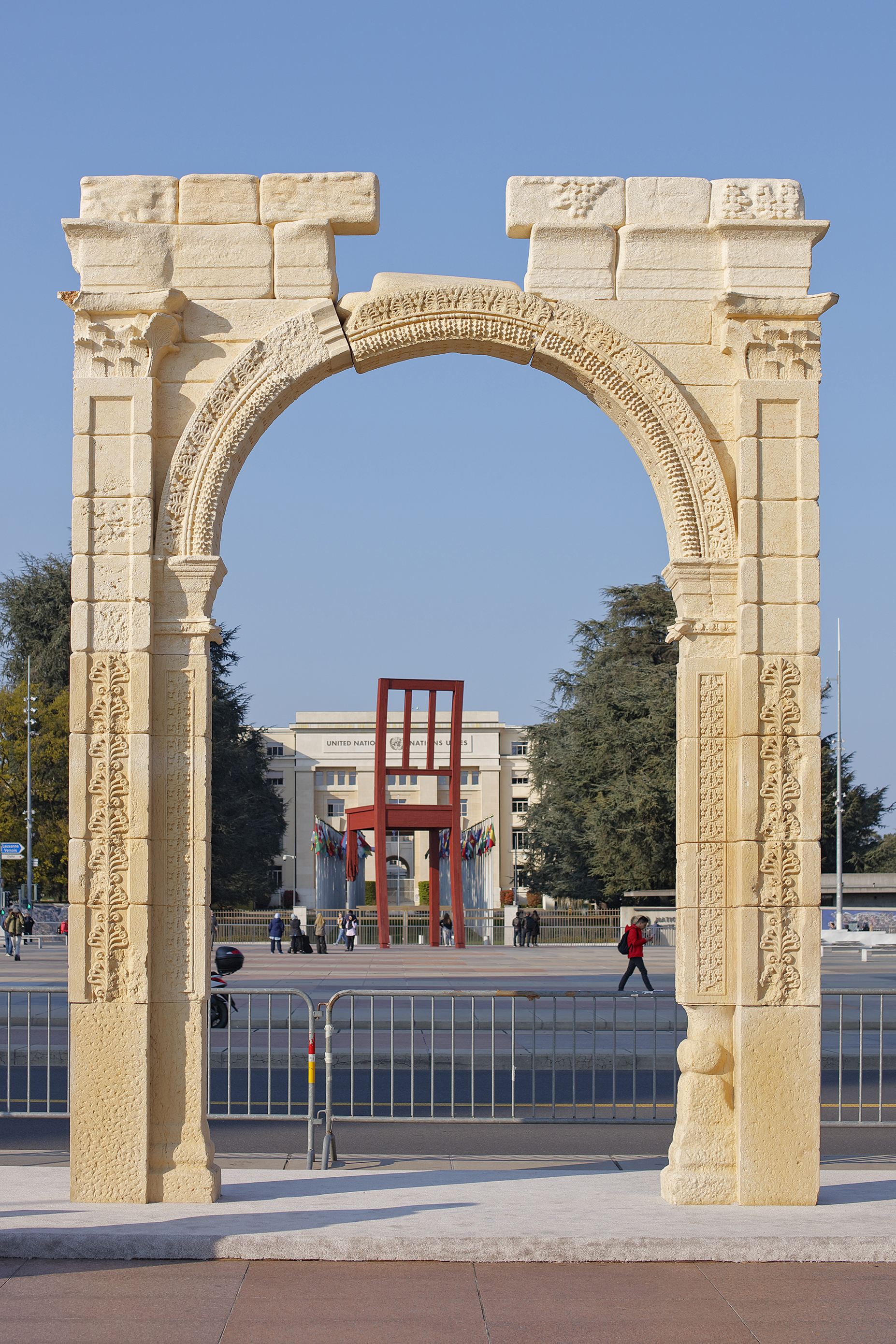
Replica of Palmyra Arch, Geneva / Switzerland, 2019

Palmyra was captured by the Islamic State of Iraq and the Levant in May 2015. The militants booby-trapped the arch some time later, and on 4 October it was reported that the arch had been blown up using dynamite. Footage released on 8 October showed that half of the structure was still standing, but by the time of the recapture of Palmyra by the Syrian Army in March 2016, very little of the arch remained standing.

The Office of the President of Syria as well as the director-general of UNESCO condemned the destruction of the Monumental Arch. According to the United Nations, the destruction showed that ISIL was "terrified by history and culture."

In March 2016, director of DGAM Maamoun Abdelkarim stated that the Monumental Arch, along with the Temples of Bel and Baalshamin, will be rebuilt using existing remains, a process called anastylosis. According to a Syrian official, reconstructing the arch would not be difficult since many of its stones still survive.

A 20 foot (6.1 m) replica of the central part of the Monumental Arch was carved out of Egyptian marble in Italy by machinery using a 3D computer model by the Institute for Digital Archaeology in Oxford, England. The replica was installed in Trafalgar Square, London on 19 April 2016. It was displayed there for three days, before being moved to a number of other locations, including New York City, Florence, Geneva, Washington, D.C., and Dubai. It is to be sent to Syria afterwards, yet as of 2023 this has still not happened.

The first phase of restoration of the Arch began on 12 November 2021. In October 2022, the Syrian Directorate-General of Antiquities and Museums and the Institute for the History of Material Culture of Russian Academy of Sciences signed an agreement to start the second and third phase of the project for restoring Arch of Triumph.
