= NEWPALMYRA =

Cultural heritage organization

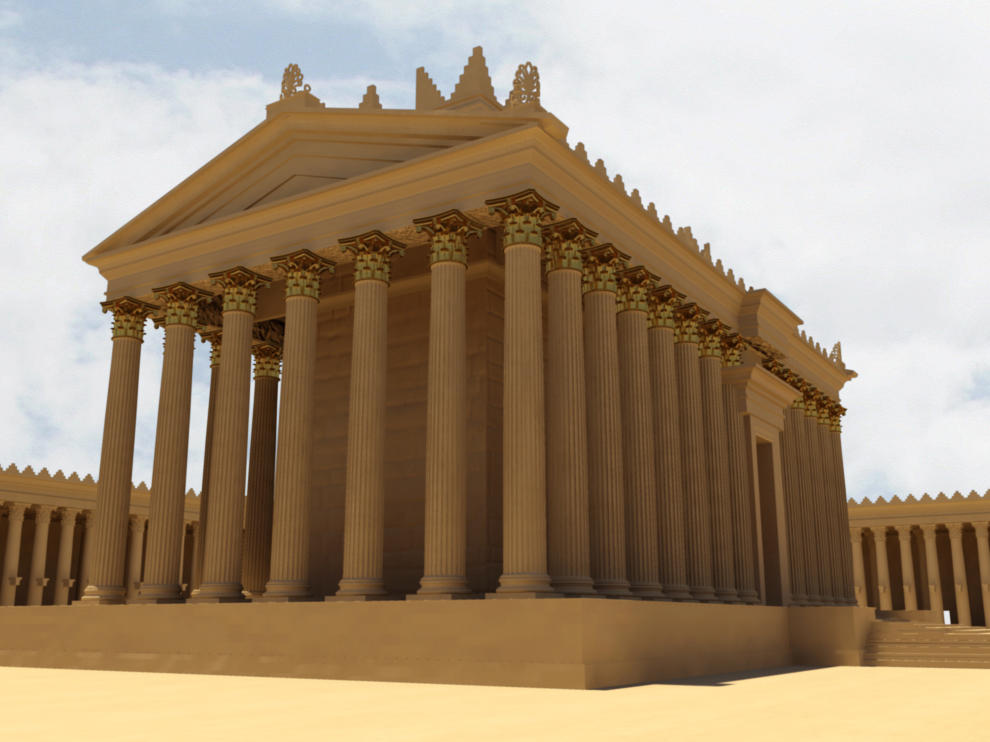
Temple of Bel rendering

#NEWPALMYRA (also known as the New Palmyra Project) is an effort to reconstruct the ancient city of Palmyra as an immersive virtual environment, based on archaeological and other clues. The project was started from photos taken by Bassel Khartabil, who had been taking care of Palmyra since 2005. He began building 3D models of the ancient city, with support from Al Aous Publishers. In 2012, Khartabil was arrested by the Assad regime, and the original project and open source files were lost. Barry Threw took over as director of the project, renamed it #NEWPALMYRA, brought together a community of developers, modelers, and archaeologists and began collaborating to model, restore, and later recreate from scratch those historical structures captured on film and camera.

In 2015, the Islamic State captured Palmyra and subsequently destroyed some of its famous historical sites. In late 2015, the Institute for Digital Archaeology began contributing to the New Palmyra Project, sending archaeologists with cheap 3D cameras to capture any further structures that ISIL might decide to destroy.

In 2018 the project organized the mass donation of over 3,000 high-quality images from tourists, heritage professionals, and researchers. They published these images as an open source archive on Flickr.com. These images portray the site over 4 decades, with the majority of images taken in the early 2000s and 2010s. This archive has been used in a number of forensic reconstruction projects, providing key data for photogrammetric reconstruction.

== 3D models ==
Arch of Triumph

Arch of Triumph as a 3D model

One of the best known structures in Palmyra was the monumental Arch of Triumph (قوس النصر). Constructed during the reign of Emperor Septimius Severus (193 to 211), it was sometimes mistakenly referred to as Hadrian’s arch. It was restored in the 1930s, and then destroyed completely during the Syrian Civil War in 2015.

Palmyra's main streets were not at right angles, and this arch was famously built at a 30-degree turn in the colonnade between the tetrapylon (التترابيل) and the Temple of Bel (معبد بل), with two richly carved façades angled away from one another.

Tetrapylon

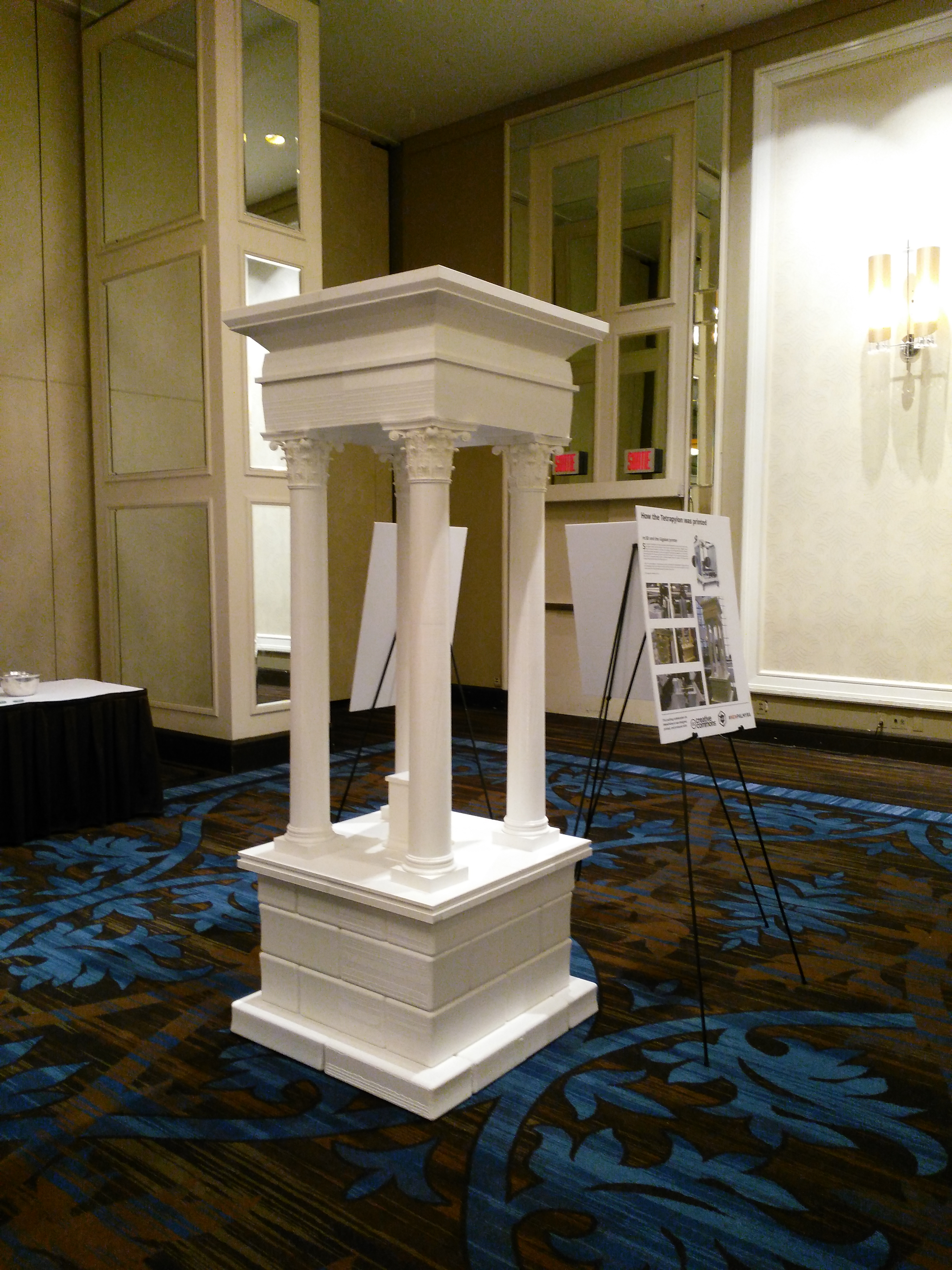
A 3D-printed version of the Tetrapylon on display at Wikimania 2017

A square platform, each corner containing a group of four columns. This was erected during the renovations of Diocletian at the end of the 3rd century. Each column had a pedestal in its center that originally supported a statue. The original columns were brought from Egypt and carved out of pink granite. Only one was undamaged in 1963 when the whole was restored with concrete. Destroyed again by ISIL on January 20, 2017.

Temple of Bel

This ancient temple was dedicated to the Mesopotamian god Bel in 32 AD. Bel was worshipped at Palmyra along with the moon god Aglibol and the sun god Yarhibol. The ruins of the temple were among the best preserved at Palmyra. they were destroyed by ISIL in August, 2015.

Roman theater

The Roman Theatre at Palmyra (المسرح الروماني بتدمر) dates to the time of Severus. Its remains were restored in the 20th century, and it served for a time as a venue for the annual Palmyra festival. It was destroyed by ISIL in May 2015.

Temple of Baal Shamin

The Temple of Baal Shamin dates to the 2nd century BC, and dedicated to the Canaanite sky deity. Its altar was built in 115 AD, and the temple was rebuilt in 131 AD. In the 5th century AD, it was converted to a church. In 2015 it was destroyed by ISIL.

Lion of Al-lāt statue

The Assad Al-lāt statue 3D model

An Arabian statue depicting an Asiatic lion and an Arabian gazelle, dated to the 1st century AD. This was the first statue modeled by #rsssd (Re-Sculpting Syrian Statues Digitally). In 2015 it was destroyed by ISIL.

== Reconstructions and exhibits ==
A 12-ton lifesize replica of part of the Arch of Triumph was carved into stone, from these models, and installed in London's Trafalgar Square in 2016.

A number of small artefacts were reconstructed and displayed at the 2016 Venice Architecture Biennale.

A 10-foot model of part of the Tetrapylon, printed in a single piece, was unveiled at the April 2017 Creative Commons Summit.

== Popular discussion ==
The project began to hold public events, partner with design groups and 3D printing shops, and receive press coverage starting in 2015.

Reviving Palmyra, a book on the history, destruction, and reconstruction of Palmyra, was published in 2017.
