= Temple of Baalshamin =

Former ancient temple in Palmyra, Syria

- معبد بعل شمين (Arabic)
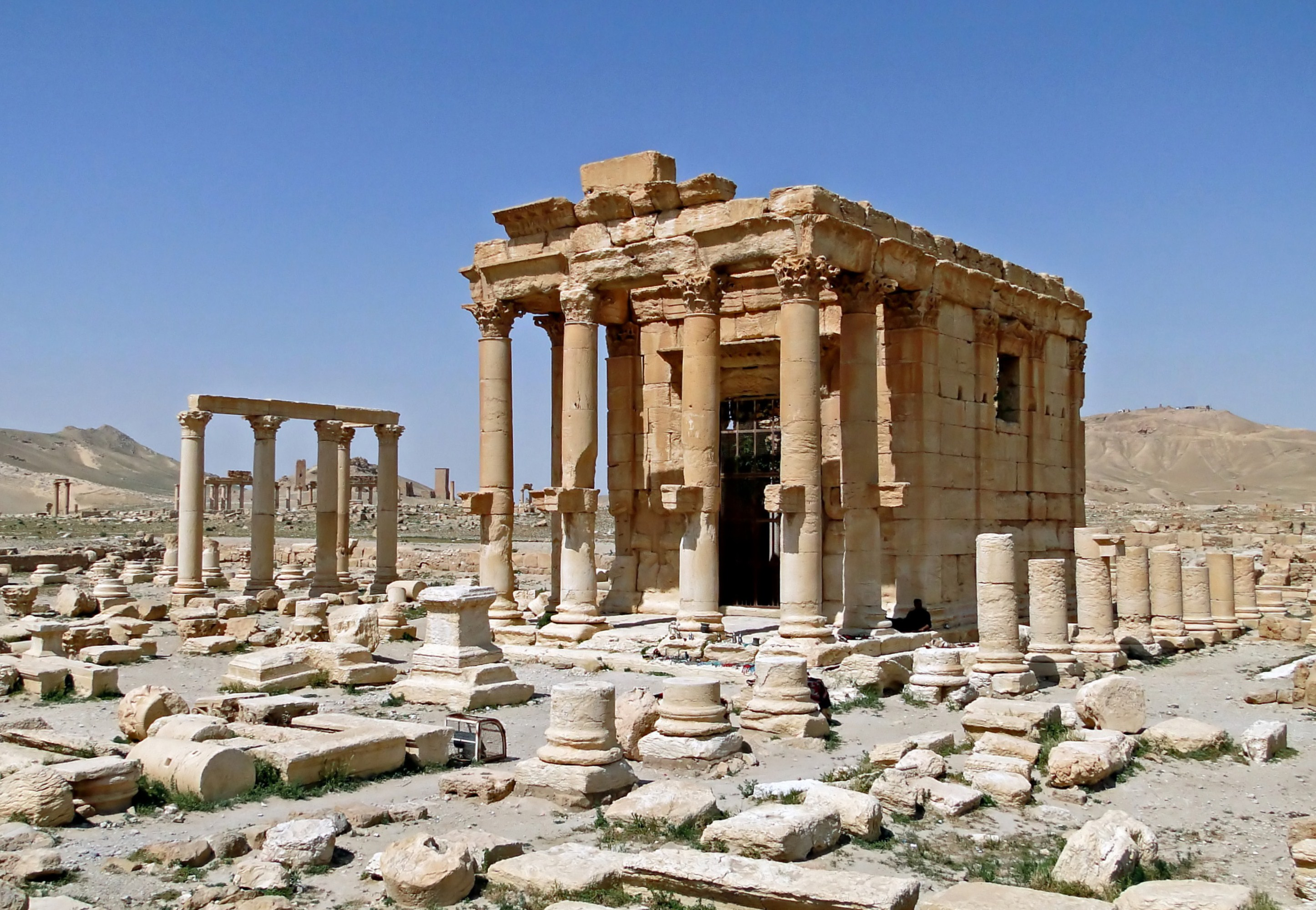
- The Temple of Baalshamin in 2010

- Location within Syria
- 34.553401°N 38.269941°E
- Type: Temple
- Cultures: Palmyrene
- Location: Palmyra, Syria

History
- Built: 131 AD

Site notes
- Material: Stone
- Excavation dates: 1954–1956
- Condition: Restored, August 2015
- Owner: Public
- Public access: Yes

UNESCO World Heritage Site
- Type: Cultural
- Criteria: i, ii, iv
- Designated: 1980 (4th session)
- Part of: Site of Palmyra
- Reference no.: 23
- Region: Arab States
- Endangered: 2013–2015 (destroyed)

The Temple of Baalshamin was an ancient temple in the city of Palmyra, Syria, dedicated to the Canaanite sky deity Baalshamin. The temple's earliest phase dates to the late 2nd century BC; its altar was built in 115 AD, and the temple was substantially rebuilt in 131 AD. The temple would have been closed during the persecution of pagans in the late Roman Empire in a campaign against the temples of the East made by Maternus Cynegius, Praetorian Prefect of Oriens, between 25 May 385 to 19 March 388. With the spreading of Christianity in the region in the 5th century AD, the temple was converted to a church.

In 1864, French photographer and naval officer Louis Vignes was the first to photograph the temple following his expedition to the Dead Sea under the sponsorship of the Duc du Luynes.

It was one of the most complete ancient structures in Palmyra. In 1980, UNESCO designated the temple as a World Heritage Site.

In 2015, the Islamic State of Iraq and the Levant demolished the Temple of Baalshamin after capturing Palmyra during the Syrian Civil War.

== Architectural style ==
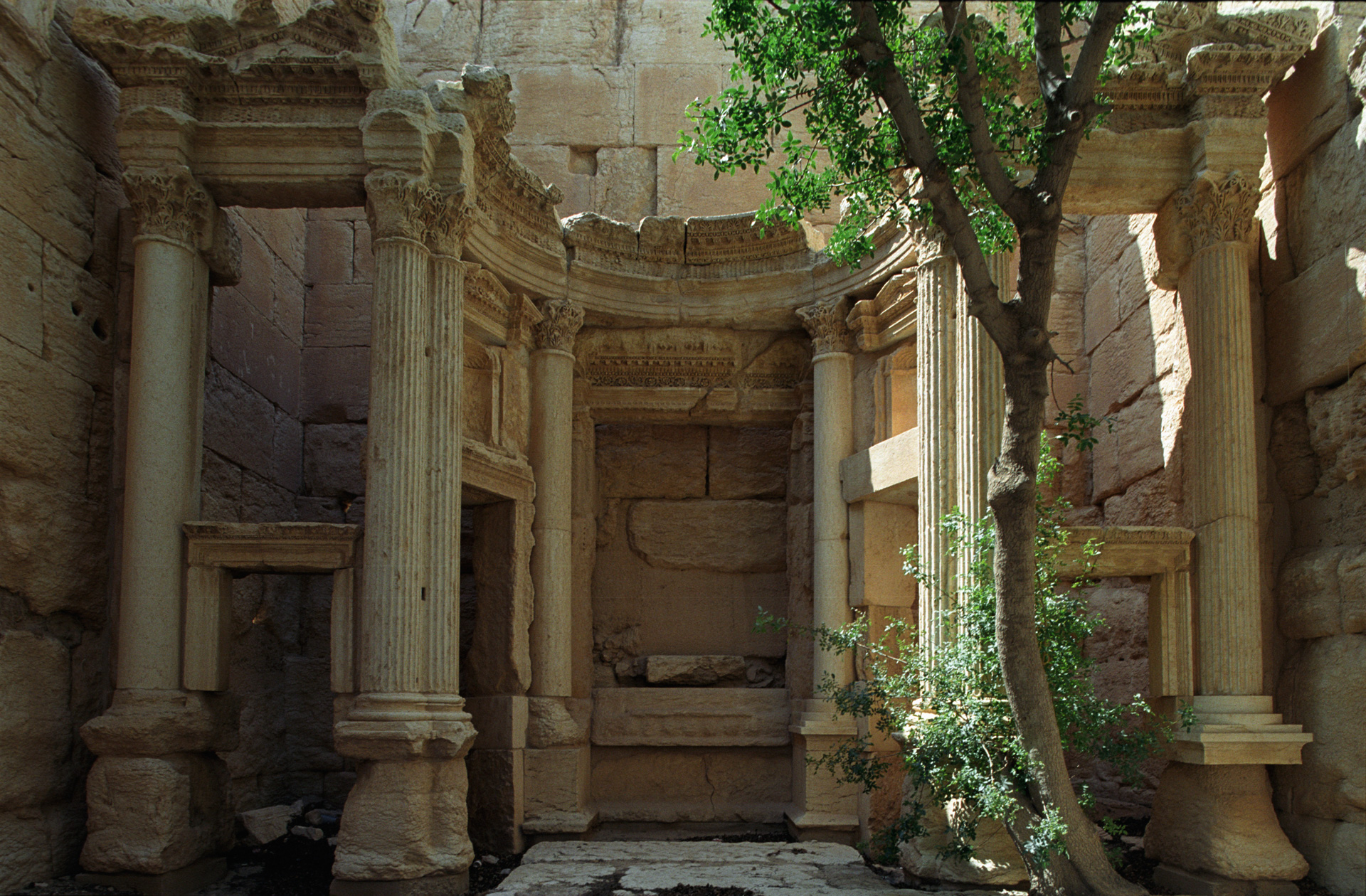
The interior of the temple in 2007

The temple was originally a part of an extensive precinct of three courtyards and represented a fusion of ancient Syrian and Roman architectural styles. The temple's proportions and the capitals of its columns were Roman in inspiration, while the elements above the architrave and the side windows followed the Syrian tradition. The highly stylized acanthus patterns of the Corinthian orders also indicated an Egyptian influence. The temple had a six-column pronaos with traces of corbels and an interior which was modelled on the classical cella. The side walls were decorated with pilasters.

== Inscription and dedication ==
An inscription written in Greek and Palmyrene, on the column bracket that supported the bust of the temple's benefactor, the Palmyrene official Male Agrippa, attested the temple was built in 131 AD. The inscription was dedicated by the Senate of Palmyra to honor Male Agrippa for building the temple, which was dedicated to Baalshamin, the Semitic god of the heavens, to commemorate the Roman Emperor Hadrian's visit to Palmyra around 129 AD. The translated inscription is:

The Senate and the people have made this statue to Male Agrippa, son of Yarhai, son of Lishamsh Raai, who, being secretary for a second time when the divine Hadrian came here, gave oil to the citizens, and to the troops and the strangers that came with him, taking care of their encampment. And he built the temple, the vestibule, and the entire decoration, at his own expense, to Baal Shamin and Durahlun.

== Damage ==
Parts of the temple were damaged to some extent by bombings in 2013, during the Syrian Civil War. The southeastern corner of the temple wall was damaged further by looters who made two openings to steal the furniture of the adjacent guesthouse.

== Destruction ==
ISIL propaganda image showing the temple's destruction in 2015

In May 2015, Palmyra was captured by the Islamic State of Iraq and the Levant (ISIL), a terrorist group with a history of destroying ancient religious structures. Shortly after, ISIL reportedly claimed that it did not intend to demolish the buildings at Palmyra's World Heritage Site, but stated that it would destroy any artifact it deemed "polytheistic" or "pagan". On 23 August 2015 (or earlier in July, according to some reports), ISIL militants detonated a large quantity of explosives inside the Temple of Baalshamin, completely destroying the building. The temple's destruction was announced by the head of the Syrian Directorate-General of Antiquities and Museums, Maamoun Abdulkarim. Photographs of the placement of the explosives, the explosion itself and the remnants of the temple subsequently appeared on social media. UNESCO described the willful destruction of the temple as a "war crime". The destruction was independently verified by a French Pléiades satellite, which photographed the pile of rubble a few days later.

After the temple's destruction, the Institute for Digital Archaeology announced plans to establish a digital record of historical sites and artifacts threatened by IS advance. To accomplish this goal, the IDA, in collaboration with UNESCO, will deploy 5,000 3D cameras to partners in the Middle East. The cameras will be used to capture 3D scans of local ruins and relics.

Following the recapture of Palmyra by the Syrian Army in March 2016, director of antiquities Maamoun Abdelkarim stated that the Temple of Baalsahamin, along with the Temple of Bel and the Monumental Arch, will be rebuilt using the surviving remains (anastylosis).

== See also ==
- Destruction of cultural heritage by ISIL
- List of heritage sites damaged during the Syrian Civil War
