= Anastylosis =

Reconstruction of archeological ruins using their original materials

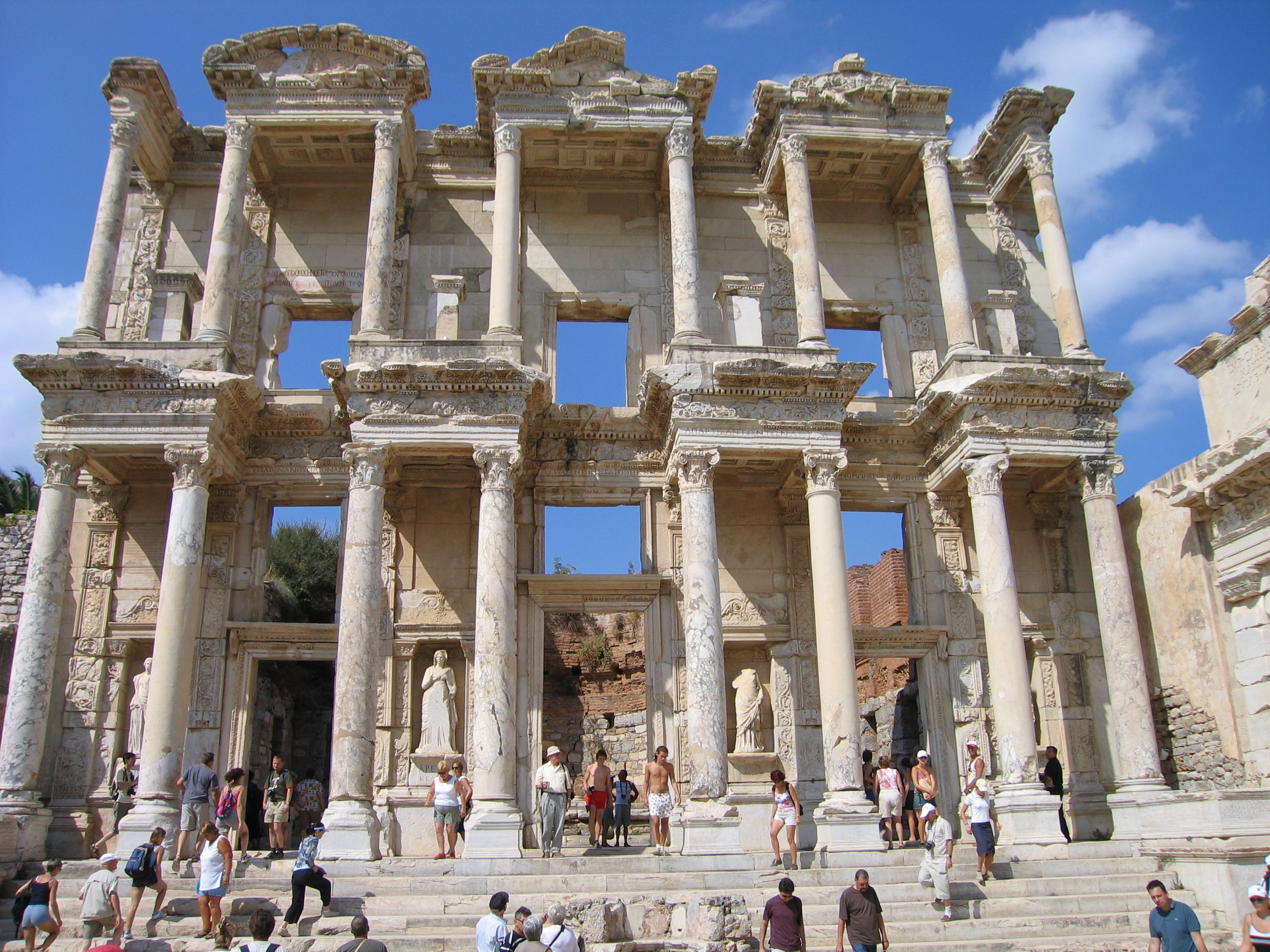
Celsus Library in Ephesus (Turkey), anastylosis carried out 1970–1978

Anastylosis (from the Ancient Greek: αναστήλωσις, -εως; ανα, ana = "again", and στηλόω = "to erect [a stela or building]") is an architectural conservation term for a reconstruction technique whereby a ruined building or monument is re-erected using the original architectural elements to the greatest degree possible, combined with modern materials if necessary. With the Venice Charter, it was established that the latter should be unobtrusive while clearly recognizable as replacement materials. It is also sometimes used to refer to a similar technique for restoring broken pottery and other small objects.

== Methodology ==
The intent of anastylosis is to rebuild ruined historical architectural monuments from as much of the original material that is left after hundreds or even thousands of years. This is done by placing components back into their original positions. Where standing buildings are at risk of collapse, the method may entail the preparation of drawings and measurements, piece-by-piece disassembly, and careful reassembly, with new materials as required for structural integrity; occasionally this may include new foundations. When elements or parts are missing, modern materials (of restoration grade) may be substituted, such as plaster, cement, and synthetic resins.

The international Venice Charter of 1964 details criteria for anastylosis. First, the original condition of the structure must be confirmed scientifically. Second, the proper placement of each recovered component must be determined. Third, supplemental components must be limited to those necessary for stability (that is, substitute components may never lie at the top), and must be recognizable as replacement materials. New construction for the sake of filling in apparent lacunae (gaps) is not allowed.

== Criticism ==
Anastylosis has its detractors in the scientific community. In effect, the method poses several problems:

- No matter how rigorous preparatory studies are, any errors of interpretation will result in errors, often undetectable or incorrigible, in reconstruction.
- Damage to the original components is practically inevitable.
- An element may be, or may have been reused in, or may have originated in, different buildings or monuments from different periods. To use it in one reconstruction obviates its use in others.

== Examples ==
=== Armenia ===
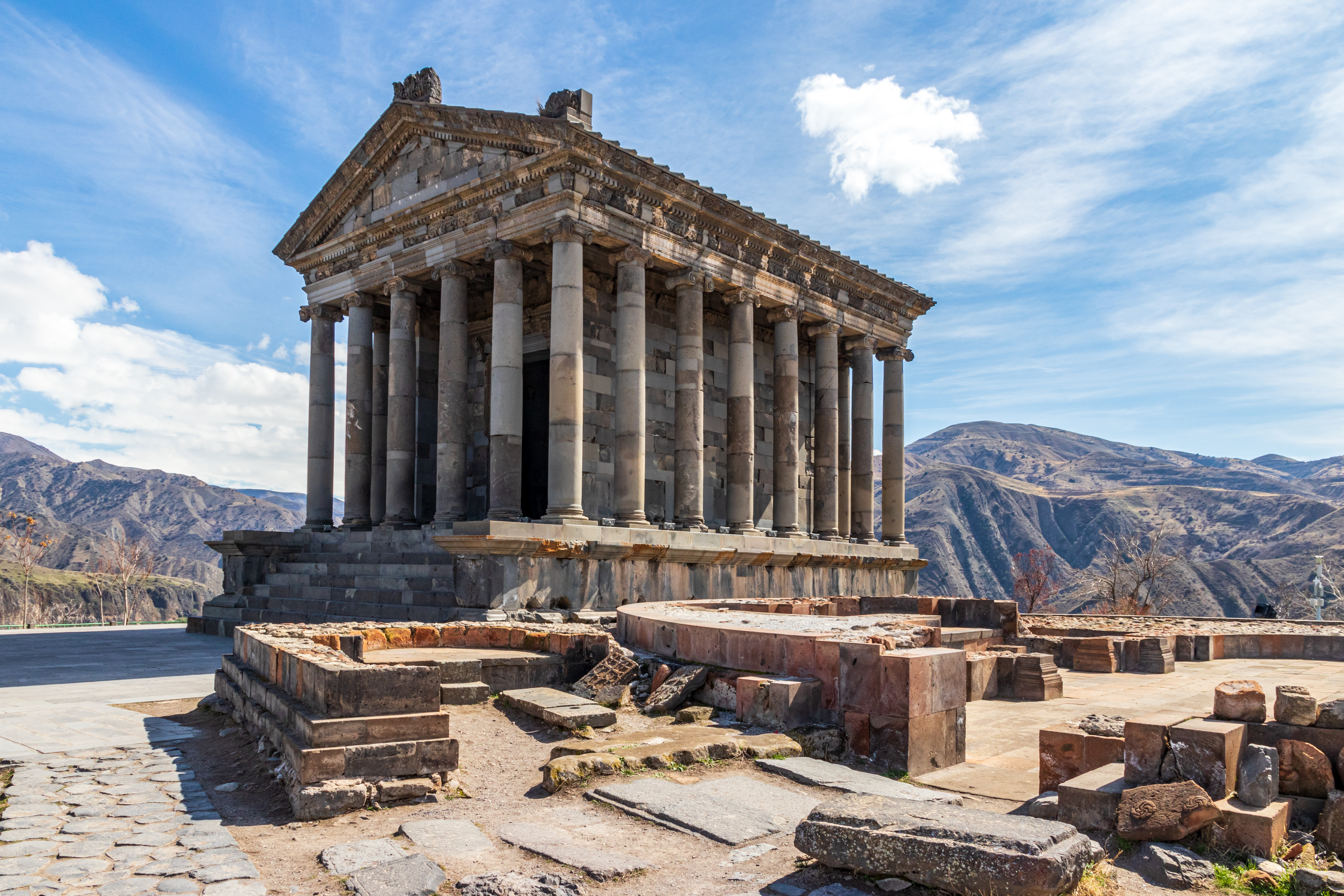
Anastylosis in Temple of Garni, Armenia

One of the well-restored structures restored by the anastylosis method is the Temple of Garni. The entire colonnade of the temple collapsed in a devastating earthquake on June 4, 1679, the epicenter of which was located in the gorge of Garni. Most of the original building blocks remained scattered at the site, allowing the building to be reconstructed. As much as 80% of the original masonry and ornamental friezes were at the site by the late 1960s. Renewed interest in the 19th century led to excavations at the site in the early and mid-20th century, and its eventual reconstruction between 1969 and 1975, using the anastylosis method.

=== Greece ===
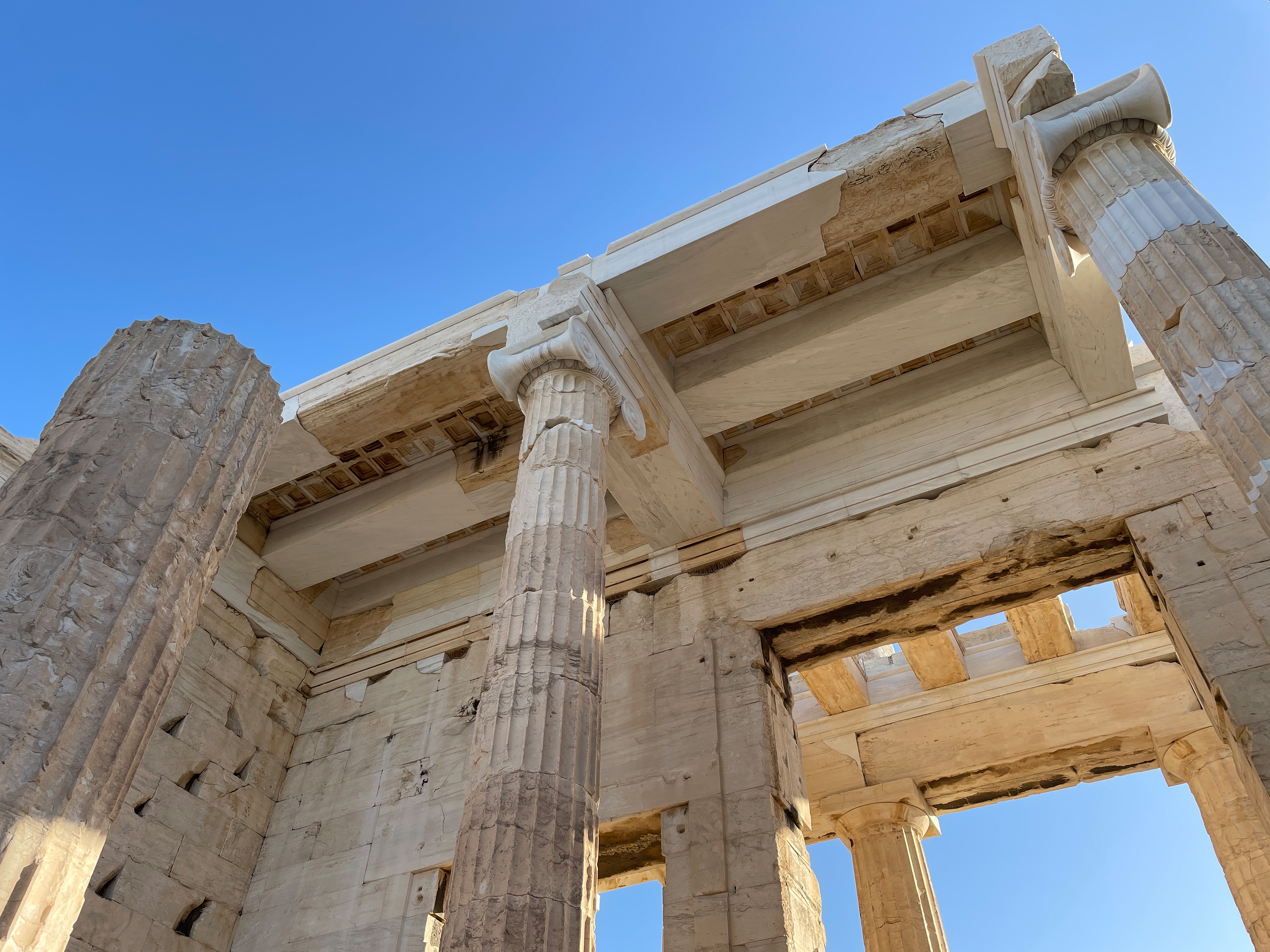
Anastylosis of the Propylaia in the Acropolis of Athens, where new elements are clearly identifiable at the ionian capitals and architrave.

A primitive anastylosis was carried out in 1836 at the Acropolis in Athens, where the Temple of Athena Nike was re-erected from remaining parts. Around 1905, Sir Arthur Evans famously reconstructed parts of the Minoan palace at Knossos. Starting in 1902, the Greek architect Nikolaos Balanos used anastylosis in order to restore a collapsed portion of the Parthenon, restore the Erechtheion, and rebuild the Nike Temple a second time. Iron clamps and plugs which had been used earlier had started to rust and had caused heavy damage to the original structure. These were removed and replaced with precious metal clamps. When the temple was once again rebuilt additional newly identified original fragments were added. Currently, anastylosis is being applied to the Parthenon.

=== India ===
Several monuments protected by the Archaeological Survey of India have been restored, including havelis in Shekhavati and Humayun's Tomb.

=== Indonesia ===
One of the earlier examples of anastylosis: the Borobudur in Java, Indonesia

Early in the 20th century, Dutch archaeologists carried out anastylosis of the stupa at the Buddhist temple complex at Borobudur in Java, Indonesia between 1907 and 1911. The Prambanan Hindu temple complex was excavated and was partially reconstructed between 1911 and 1953, also reconstructed using the anastylosis method. The recent practice of anastylosis in Indonesia is the reconstruction of Kedulan temple, built in 869, the temple was buried under volcanic layers for centuries, until it was discovered in 1993. The restoration of the entire Kedulan Temple complex was expected to be completed by the end of 2018.

=== Cambodia ===
The École Française d'Extrême-Orient (EFEO) began restoration work at Angkor Wat in 1908. Between 1986 and 1992, the Archaeological Survey of India (ASI) carried out restoration work on the temple. Bayon was restored by EFCO followed by Japanese Government Team for the Safeguarding of Angkor (JSA). Ta Prohm is being restored by the Archaeological Survey of India.

=== Turkey ===
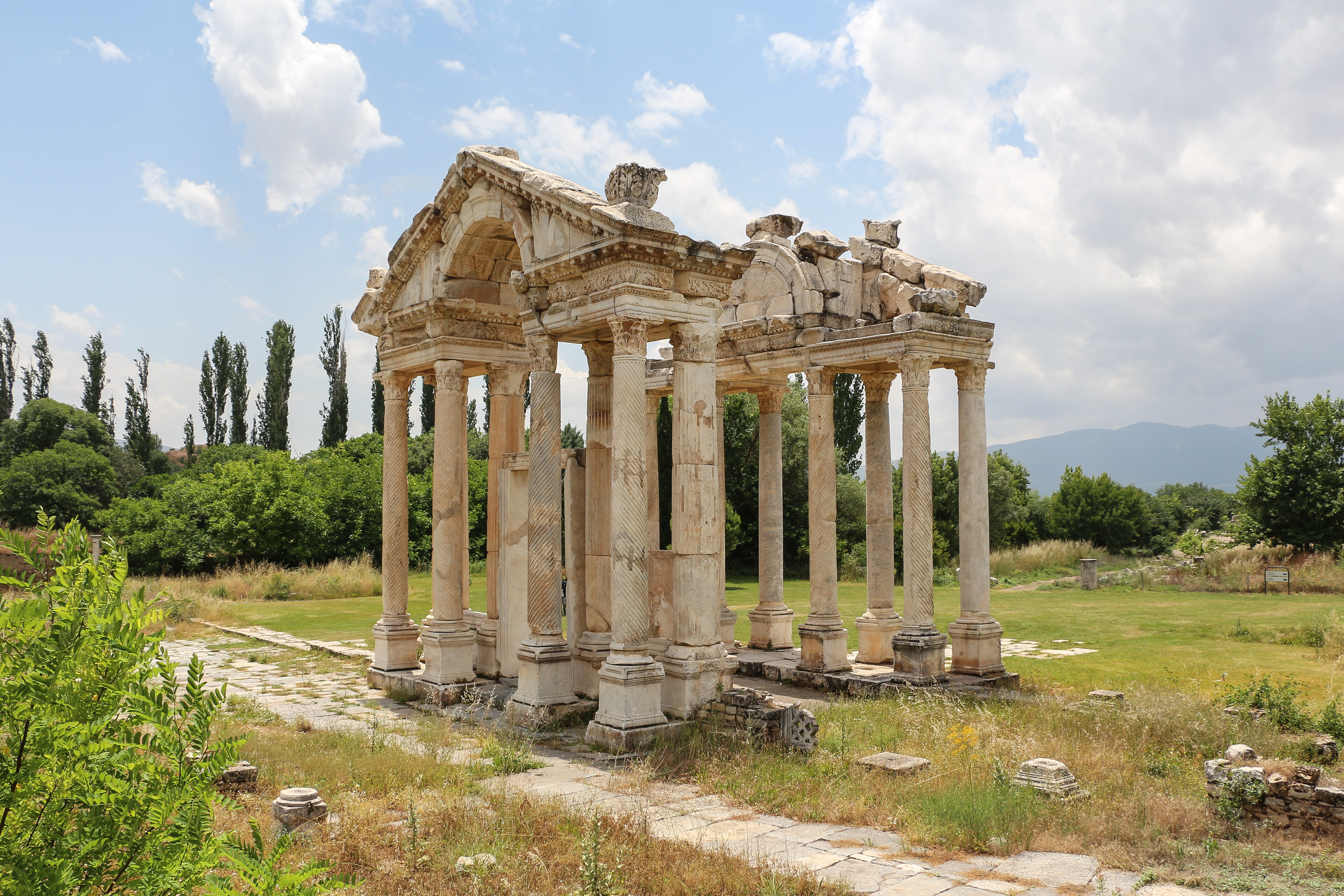
A monumental gateway Tetrapylon (built 200 AD), Aphrodisias, Turkey

Aphrodisias has several buildings sufficiently well preserved to allow such anastylosis: the Tetrapylon (1983–90); the east end of the Sebasteion's South Building (2000–2012); the Doric logeion of the Theatre (2011–2012); and the Propylon of the Sebasteion complex (2012–present).

=== Others ===
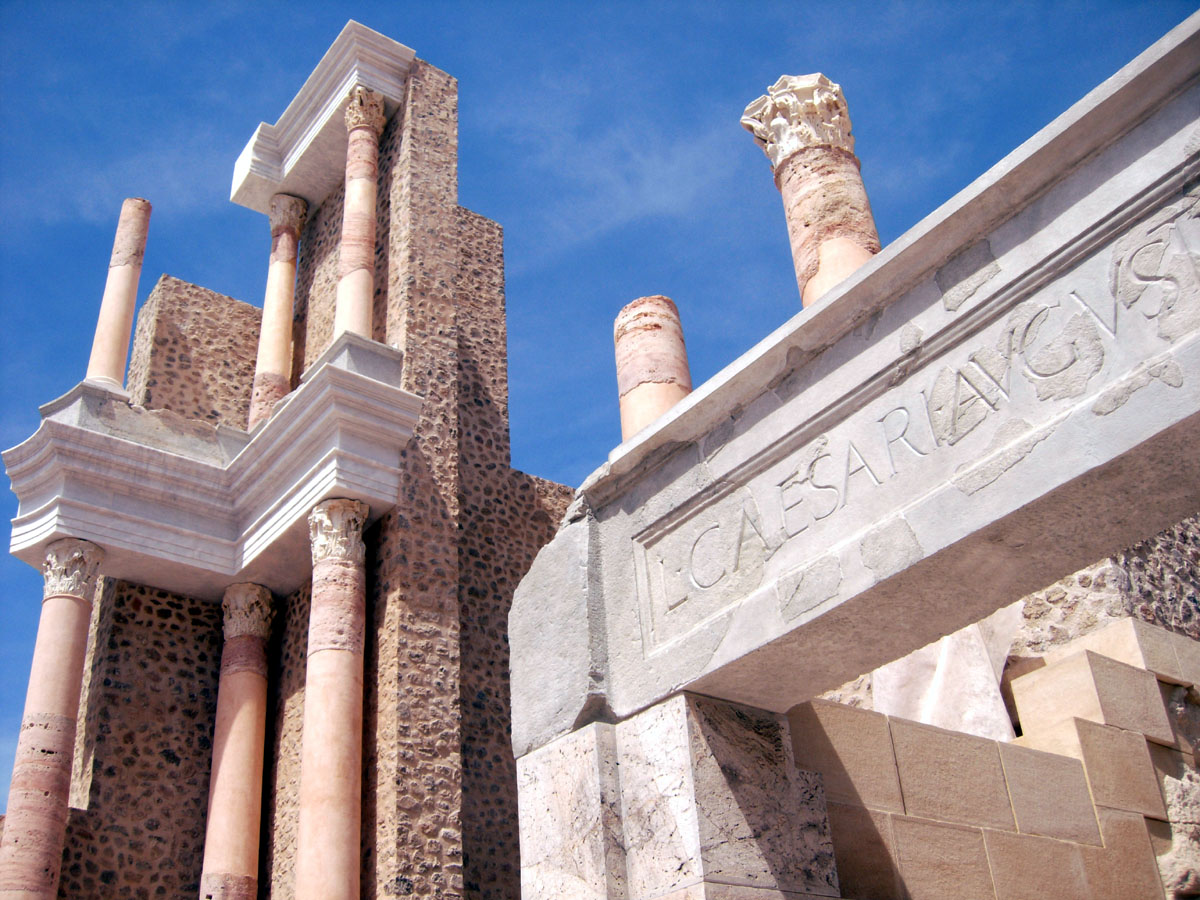
Anastylosis in the Roman Theatre of Cartagena, Spain

- Temple of Heracles in Agrigento, Italy
- Temple of Debod in Madrid, Spain
- Roman Theatre of Cartagena, Spain
- Ancient theater of Sabratha, Libya
- Stari Most, Mostar, Bosnia and Herzegovina
- Odeion in Troy, Turkey
- Temple of Trajan, Pergamon, Turkey
- Al Khazneh, Petra, Jordan
- King's funerary complex at Djoser, Egypt by Jean-Philippe Lauer (1926–2001)
- Red Chapel at Karnak, Egypt
- Temple of Dakka in Lower Nubia, Egypt
- Cretan Palace at Knossos, Crete, by the archaeologist Arthur John Evans
- South Palace at Vat Phu, Laos
- Mỹ Sơn, Vietnam
- Notre Dame de Paris, France
- Mesa Verde, United States
- Frauenkirche, Dresden

== Proposals ==
The Buddhas of Bamyan in Afghanistan which were destroyed by the Taliban in 2001 are under consideration for anastylosis. Archaeologists have estimated that as much as 50% of the statues' material is recoverable.

It would be possible to reconstruct the Gourgion Tower in Gozo, Malta using anastylosis, since many of its decorated stones and inscriptions were retrieved following its destruction in 1943 by the United States, and are now in storage at Heritage Malta.

Following the recapture of Palmyra by the Syrian Army in March 2016, director of antiquities Maamoun Abdelkarim stated that the Temple of Bel, the Temple of Baalshamin and the Monumental Arch, which had been destroyed by the Islamic State of Iraq and the Levant in 2015, will be rebuilt using anastylosis.

== See also ==
- Reconstruction (architecture)
