= Temple of Bel =

Ruins of an ancient temple in Palmyra, Syria

- معبد بعل (Arabic)
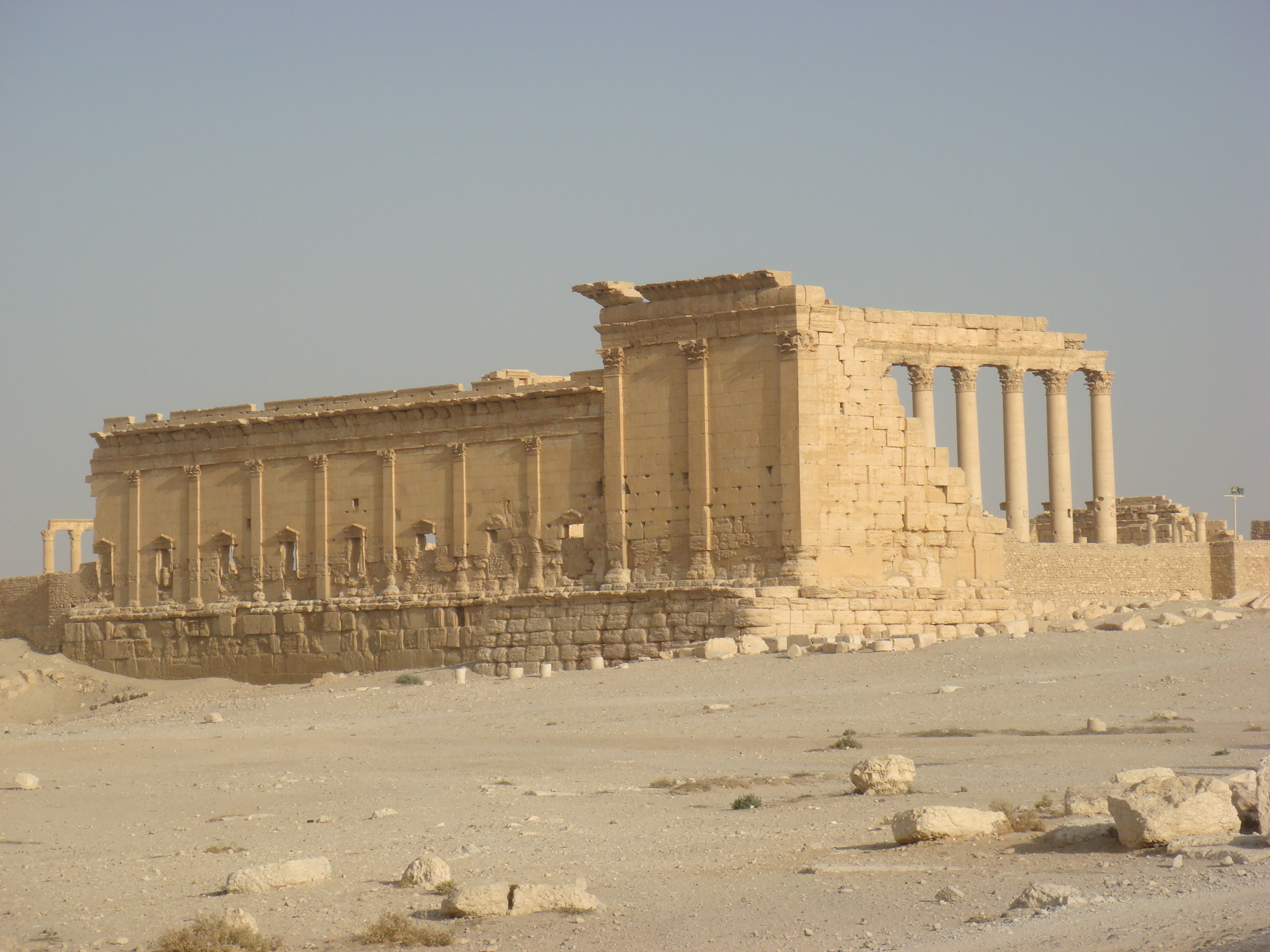
- The Temple of Bel's exterior in 2009

- Location within Syria
- 34.547°N 38.274°E
- Type: Temple
- Cultures: Palmyrene
- Location: Palmyra, Syria

History
- Built: 32 AD

Site notes
- Material: Stone
- Height: 15 metres (49 ft)
- Condition: Main building destroyed, exterior walls and gate survive
- Owner: Public
- Public access: Yes

UNESCO World Heritage Site
- Type: Cultural
- Criteria: i, ii, iv
- Designated: 1980 (4th session)
- Part of: Site of Palmyra
- Reference no.: 23
- Region: Arab States
- Endangered: 2013–present

The Temple of Bel (Arabic: معبد بعل), sometimes also referred to as the "Temple of Baal", was an ancient temple located in Palmyra, Syria. The temple, consecrated to the Mesopotamian god Bel, worshipped at Palmyra in triad with the lunar god Aglibol and the sun god Yarhibol, formed the center of religious life in Palmyra and was dedicated in AD 32. The temple was closed during the persecution of pagans in the late Roman Empire in a campaign against the temples of the East made by Maternus Cynegius, Praetorian Prefect of Oriens, between 25 May 385 to 19 March 388. Its ruins were considered among the best preserved at Palmyra, until they were further destroyed by the Islamic State in August 2015. The arched main entrance into the temple is still intact, as well as its exterior walls and fortified gate.

== History ==
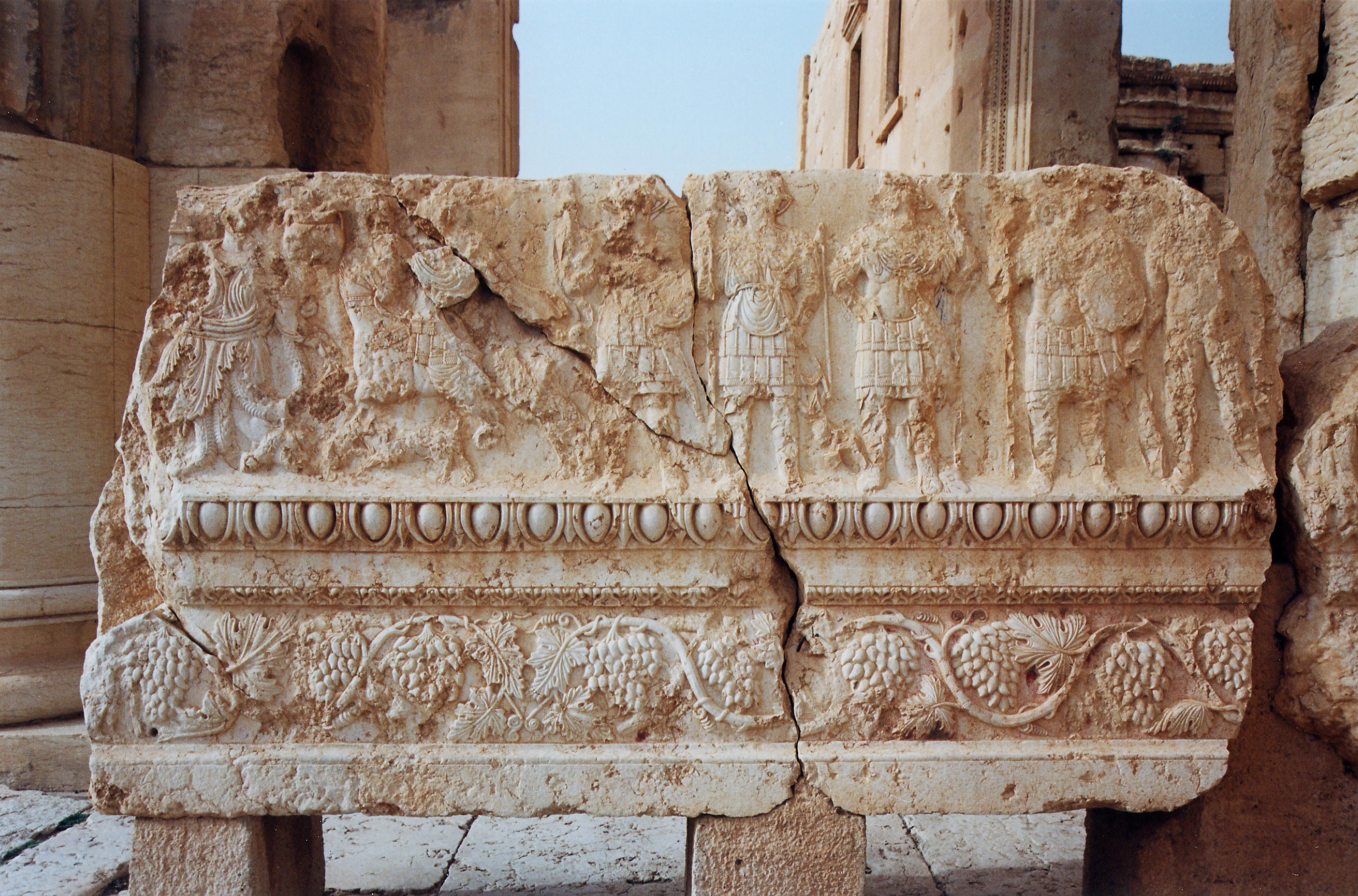
Relief at the courtyard of the temple showing detailed ornaments and depictions of Palmyrene war deities

The temple was built on a tell with stratification indicating human occupation that goes back to the third millennium BC. The area was occupied in pre-Roman periods with a former temple that is usually referred to as "the first temple of Bel" and "the Hellenistic temple". The walls of the temenos and propylaea were constructed in the late first and the first half of the second century AD. The names of three Greeks who worked on the construction of the temple of Bel are known through inscriptions, including an architect named Alexandras (Greek: Αλεξάνδρας). However, many Palmyrenes adopted Greco-Roman names and native citizens with the name Alexander are attested in the city.

The Temple of Bel was converted into a Christian church during the Byzantine Era. Parts of the structure were modified by Arabs in 1132 which preserved the structure and converted the Temple into a mosque. The enormous temple courtyard (approx. 200 x 200 meters) held mud-brick houses among the ruins, and served as a fortified citadel for the village of Palmyra (known as Tadmur during the 1100s). The mosque in the temple proper and the dwellings remained in use until the 1920s when Franco-Syrian archaeological missions cleared the temple grounds of its postclassical elements. Most of the Corinthian columns of the inner colonnades still showed pedestals where the statues of the benefactors stood. The temple was aligned along the eastern end of the Great Colonnade at Palmyra.

== Architecture ==
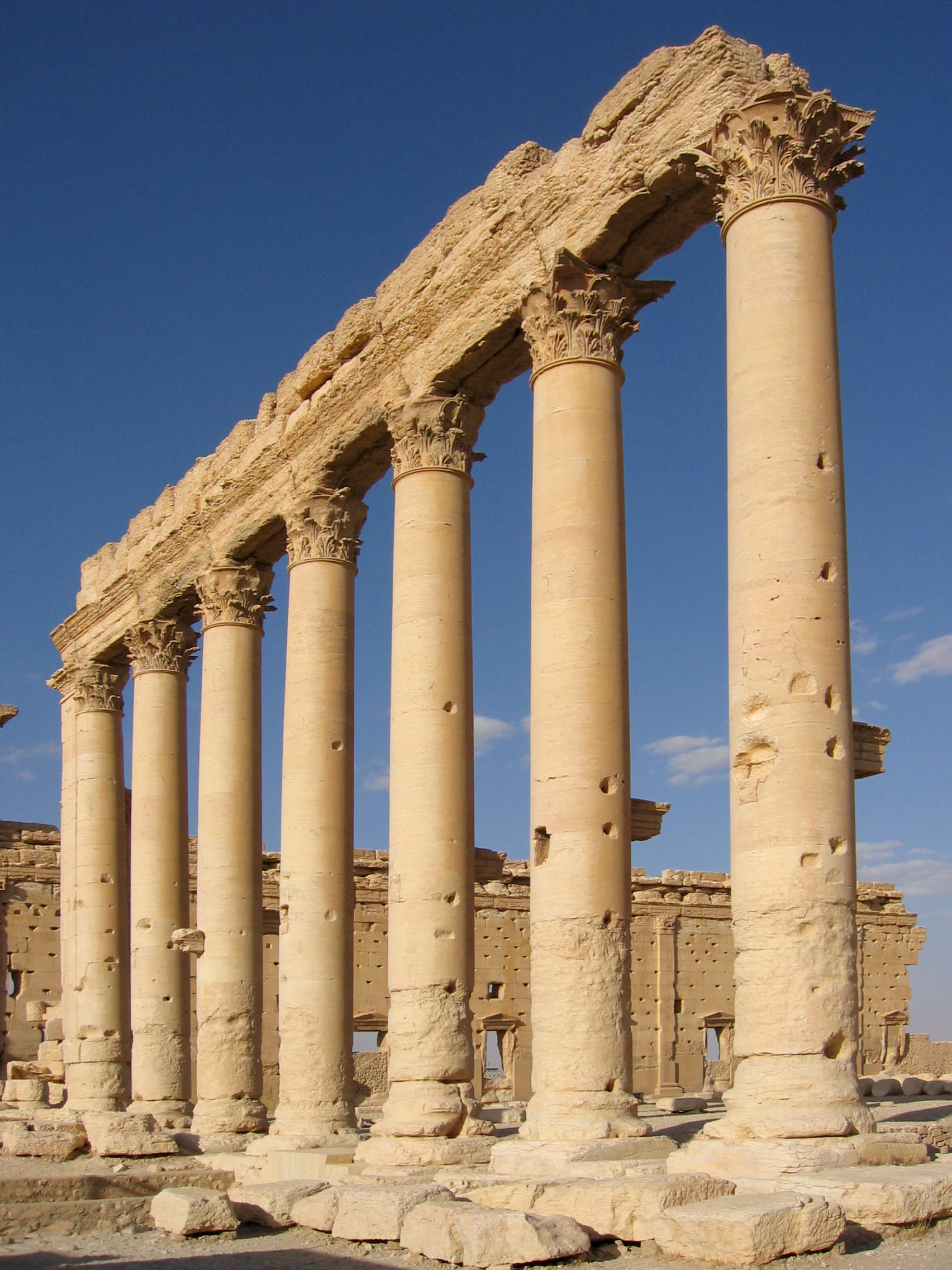
Columns in the inner court of the temple

The temple showed a remarkable synthesis of ancient Near Eastern and Greek cultures. The temple remains lay inside a large precinct lined by porticos. It had a rectangular shape and was oriented north–south. It was based on a paved court surrounded by a massive 205-metre (673 ft) long wall with a propylaeum. On a podium in the middle of the court was the actual temple building. The cella was entirely surrounded by a prostyle of Corinthian columns, only interrupted on the long side by an entrance gate with large steps leading from the court. The cella was unique in the fact that it had two inner sanctuaries, the north and south adytons, dedicated as the shrines of Bel and other local deities. The northern chamber was known for a bas-relief carving of the seven planets known to the ancients surrounded by the twelve signs of the Zodiac and the carvings of a procession of camels and veiled women. The cella was lit by two pairs of windows cut high in the two long walls. In three corners of the building stairwells could be found that led up to rooftop terraces.

In the court there were the remains of a basin, an altar, a dining hall, and a building with niches. And in the northwest corner lay a ramp along which sacrificial animals were led into the temple area. There were three monumental gateways, of which the entry was through the west gate.

== Destruction ==
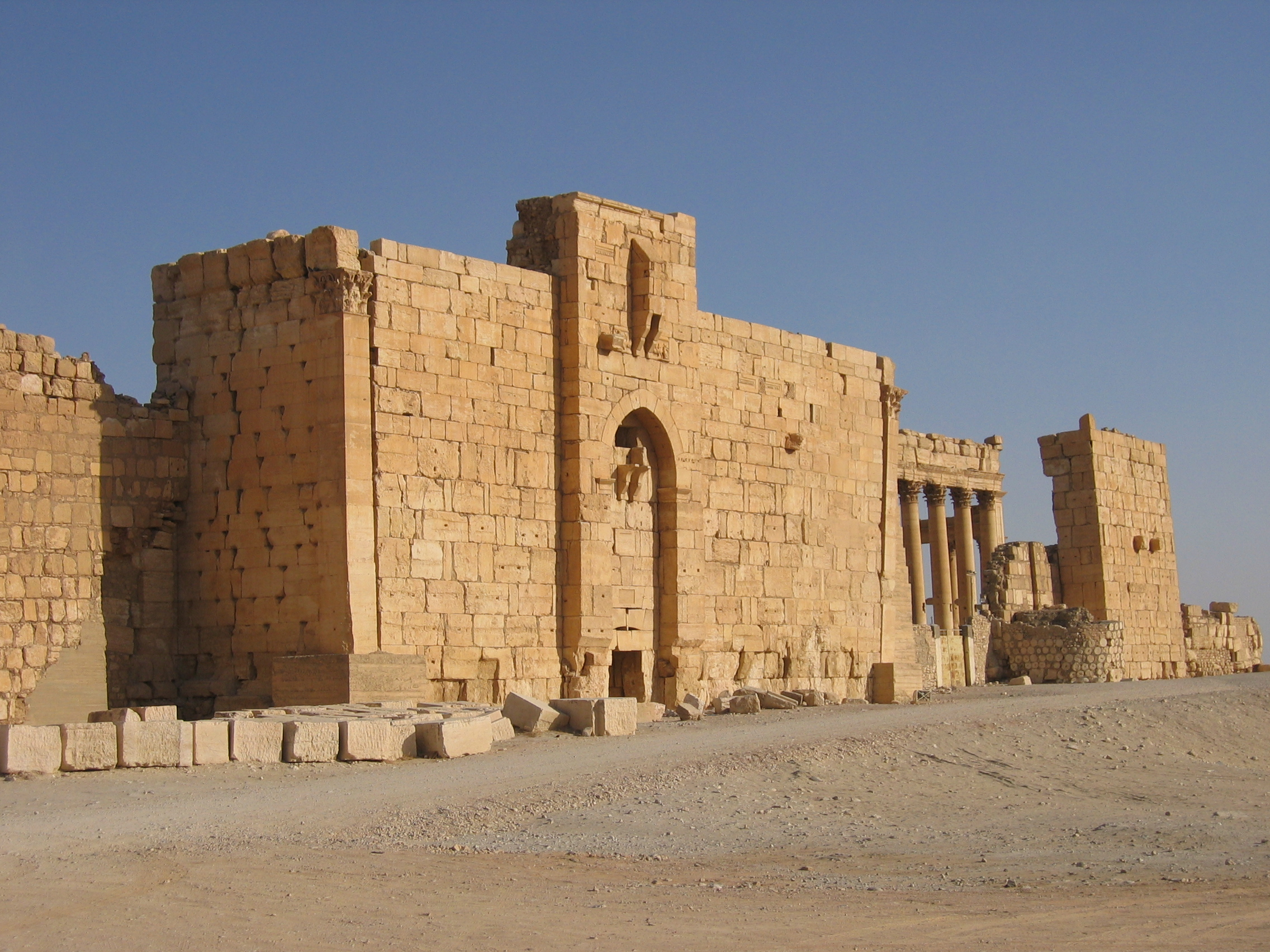
The Temple's fortified gate and its exterior walls survived the destruction

Syria's Director of Antiquities Maamoun Abdul Karim stated that ISIL was looking for treasures and "stores of gold" in the city. On 30 August 2015, the Associated Press reported that ISIS had partially demolished the temple by explosives, citing eyewitness accounts. The bricks and columns were reported as lying on the ground and only one wall was reported as remaining, according to a Palmyra resident. The damage was also attested by the Syrian Observatory for Human Rights.

Syria's antiquities chief Maamoun Abdulkarim later stated that although there was an explosion within the temple's perimeter, "the basic structure is still standing". However, these reports were proved to be incorrect.

On August 31, 2015, the United Nations confirmed the temple's destruction after reviewing satellite imagery, "We can confirm destruction of the main building of the Temple of Bel as well as a row of columns in its immediate vicinity" reported by the United Nations Institute for Training and Research (UNITAR). The BBC issued a video report showing the satellite images and the destruction described by Einar Bjorgo, manager of UN Satellite Imaging (UNOSAT UNITAR).

The main entrance arch survived the destruction of the temple. The Institute for Digital Archaeology proposed that replicas of this arch be installed in Trafalgar Square, London and Times Square, New York City. It was later decided that instead of the temple's main entrance, the replica would be of part of the Monumental Arch.

=== Restoration ===
Following the recapture of Palmyra by the Syrian Army in March 2016, director of antiquities Maamoun Abdelkarim stated that the Temple of Bel, along with the Temple of Baalshamin and the Monumental Arch, will be rebuilt using the surviving remains. ISIL recaptured the city on 11 December, but the Syrian Army retook it on 2 March 2017.

In July 2017, the French company "Art Graphique et Patrimoine" travelled to Palmyra and scanned the Temple's rubble in order to create a plan for its restoration.

=== Digital Reconstructions ===
The destruction of the Temple of Bel coincided with a boom in digital documentation and reconstruction technologies, and motivated a number of research and digital heritage organizations to engage in reconstruction projects. As the temple had been a popular tourist destination in Syria for many years, a great many images existed which portrayed the temple from many angles and viewpoints, making it an ideal candidate for photogrammetric reconstruction. Wissam Wahbeh and Stephen Nebiker, Researchers at the University of Applied Sciences and Arts Northwestern Switzerland demonstrated this capability, created a 3D model using tourist images along with proprietary data held by photogrammetry pioneer Gabriele Fangi. The New Palmyra Project organized the donation of over 3,000 high resolution images and published the collection as open data on Flickr.com, which is ideal for reconstruction as the platform preserves image metadata enabling complex matching of images from multiple sources. A comprehensive version, featuring full resolution reconstructions of reliefs, frescoes, and finely detailed decorative features, along with the raw data, was later published by UC San Diego Data Scientist Scott McAvoy in the hopes of encouraging continued collaboration informing future reconstruction efforts.

== Image gallery ==
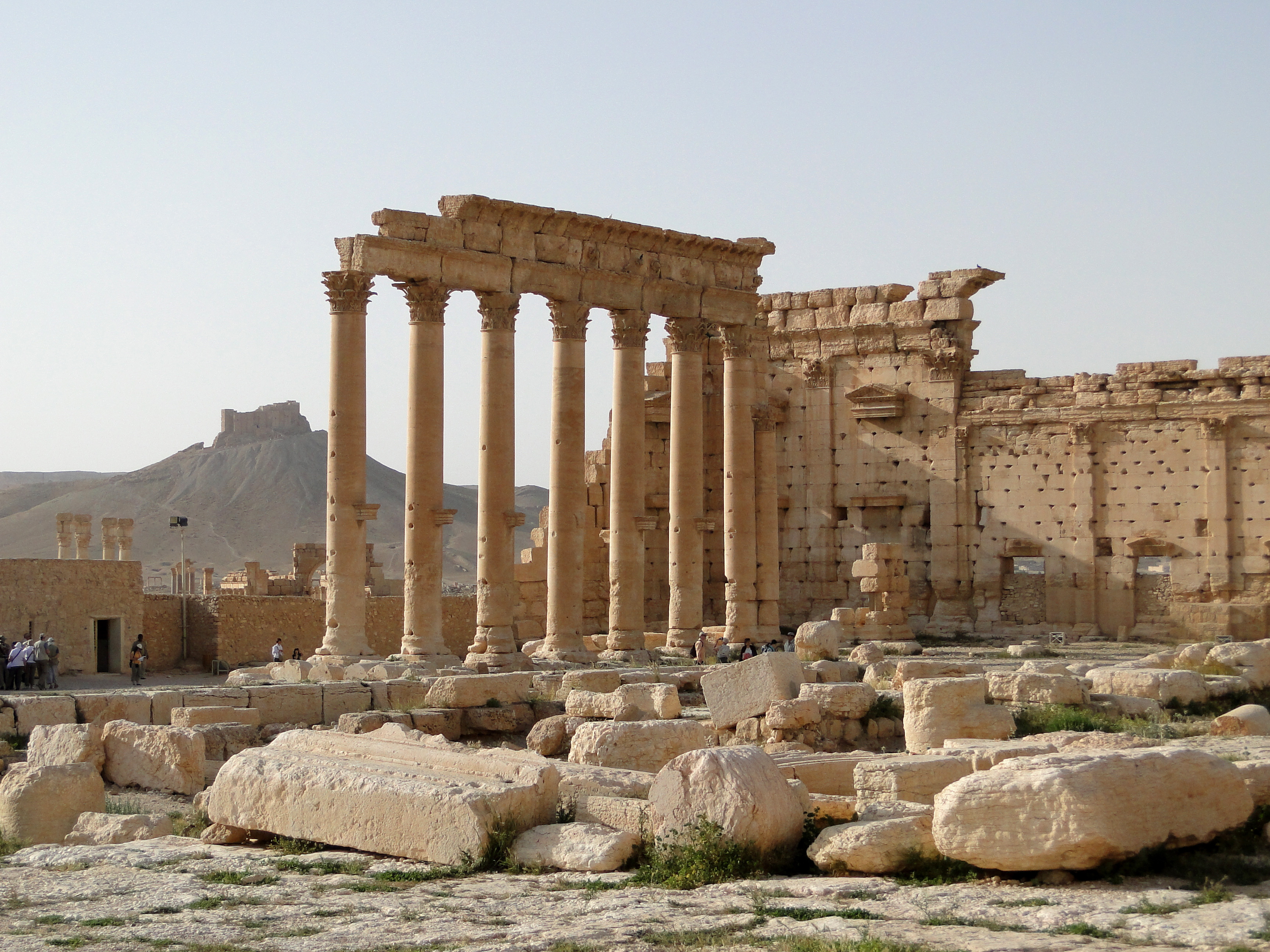
Remains of columns and walls at the courtyard.

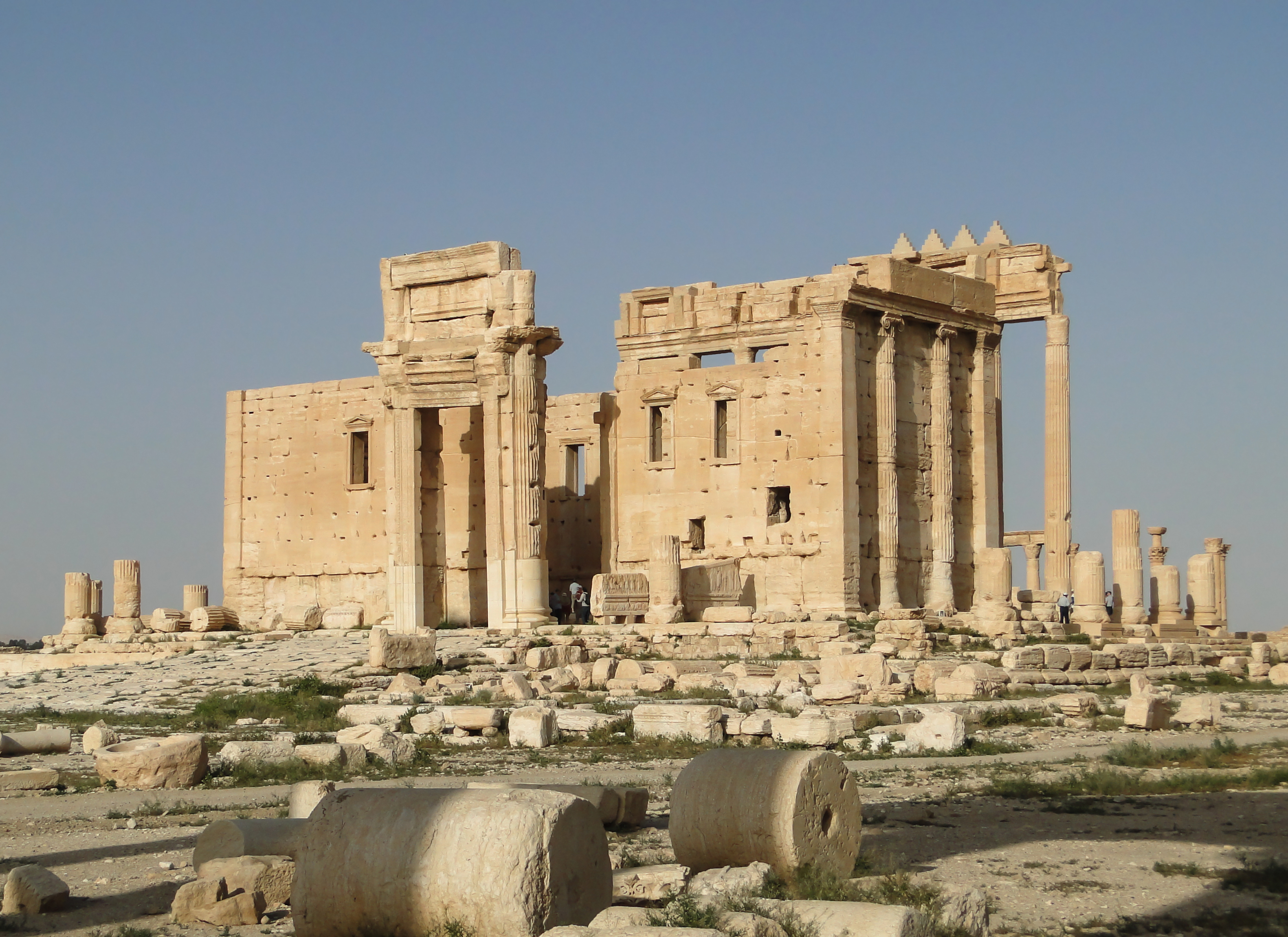
The Temple's cella in 2010.

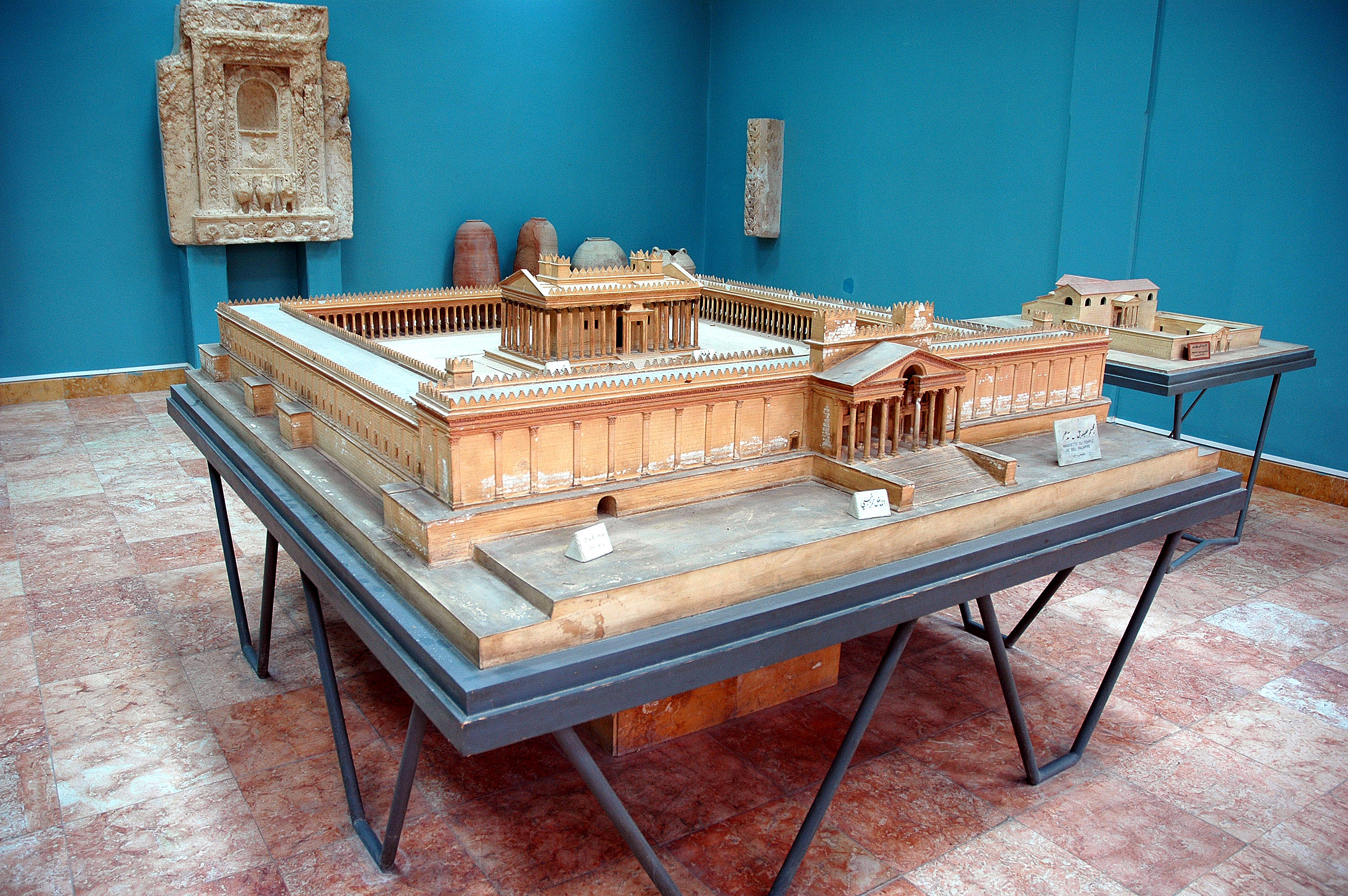
Mockup of the temple at the Palmyra Archeological Museum. Destroyed by Islamic State in 2015.

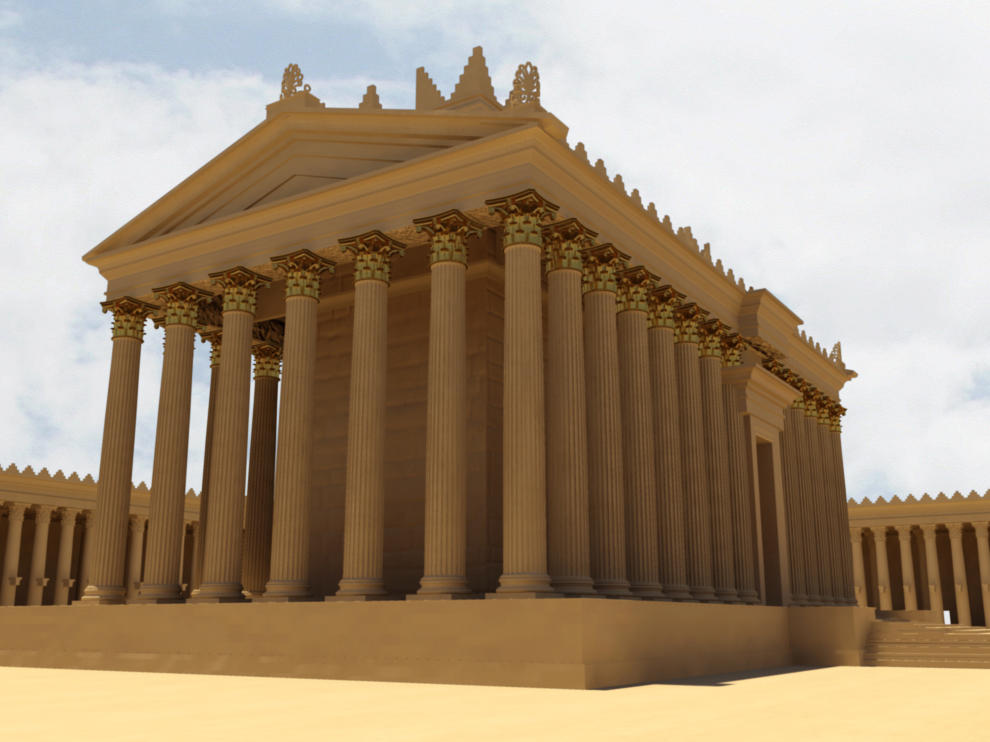
Digital reconstruction of the Temple of Bel from the New Palmyra project.

== See also ==
- List of Ancient Roman temples

== Bibliography ==
- Becker, Jeffrey A. Temple of Bel. Smarthistory
- Gates, Charkes (2003), Ancient cities: the archaeology of urban life in the Ancient Near East and Egypt, Greece and Rome, Routledge, ISBN 978-0-415-01895-1
- Kaizer, Ted (2002), The religious life of Palmyra: a study of the social patterns of worship in the Roman period, Franz Steiner Verlag, ISBN 978-3-515-08027-9
- Cremin, Aedeen (2007), Archaeologica: The World's Most Significant Sites and Cultural Treasures, Frances Lincoln Ltd., ISBN 978-0-7112-2822-1
