= Noura Ghazi =

Syrian human rights lawyer

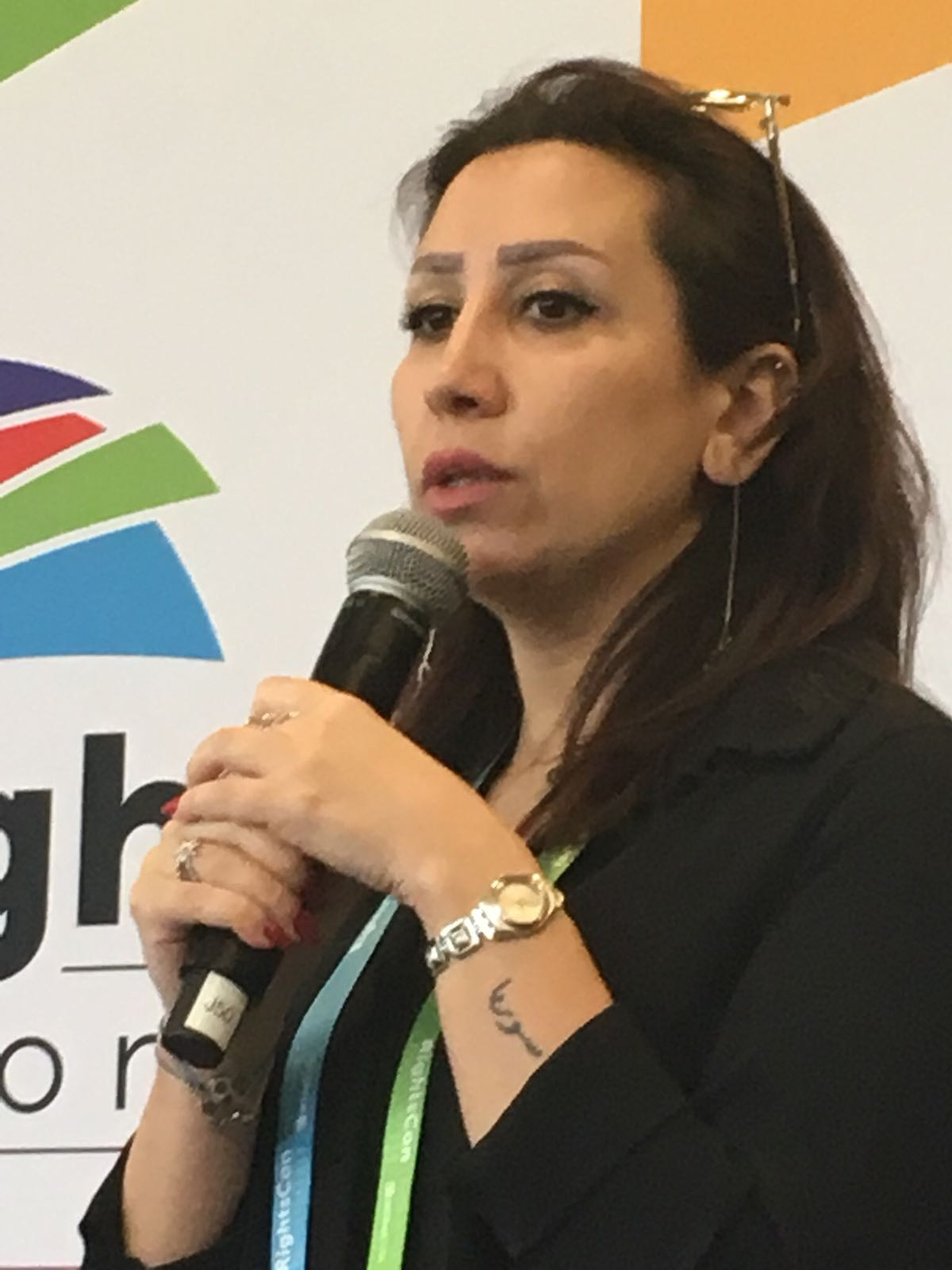
- Born: 30 September 1981 (age 45); Damascus, Syria
- Other name: Noura Ghazi Safadi
- Education: Damascus University
- Occupations: Human rights lawyer and activist
- Spouse: Bassel Khartabil (m. 2013; died 2015)

Noura Ghazi (نورة غازي), or Noura Ghazi Safadi (نورة غازي صفدي) (born 30 September 1981) is a Syrian human rights lawyer and activist. Her husband, the Syrian-Palestinian Bassel Khartabil (Arabic: باسل خرطبيل), or Bassel Safadi (Arabic: باسل صفدي) was an open-source software developer and one of Syria's leading pro-free speech and democracy activists. He was arrested by the Syrian government in 2012 and executed in 2015.

== Life ==
Ghazi had an early introduction to human rights violations against political prisoners when her father, a political dissident, was arrested when she was still a child. She used to visit him in Adra prison in Damascus and attend his trial hearings. When she was only 12 years old she swore that she would become a lawyer and defend prisoners of conscience. Ghazi studied law at Damascus University.

Ghazi met her husband Bassel Khartabil Safadi in April 2011 at a protest in Douma against Bashar al-Assad’s autocratic rule. On 15 March 2012, Khartabil was detained by the Syrian government at Adra Prison. In the first week of 2013, Ghazi and Khartabil got married. The wedding took place over two prison visits: the first time, Ghazi and Khartabil exchanged vows. On the second visit, Ghazi was accompanied by her uncle, a lawyer, and the marriage was officially approved.

Between then and 3 October 2015, Khartabil had been transferred to an unknown location, probably to be judged by a military court. On 11 November 2015, rumors surfaced that Khartabil had been secretly sentenced to death. In August 2017 Ghazi learned the truth that Khartabil had been executed by the Syrian regime shortly after his disappearance in 2015. She still does not know what has happened to her husband’s remains.

The story of Ghazi and Khartabil, also known as The Bride and Groom of the Revolution, became widely known among activists.

== Work ==
Ghazi wrote Waiting, a poetic memoir, part journal, part love letter to her husband. The twenty-six poems that make up the collection are arranged in chronological order spanning the couple's history together, which in turn parallels the course of the Syrian revolution. The couple worked more than a year on this book together, between Ghazi choosing texts, and smuggling them into prison one by one when visiting Khartabil, and him translating them into English.

Ghazi is part of Families for Freedom, established in 2017 as the first female-led advocacy group for Syrian detainees and their relatives. With most of the people disappearing in the country male, it is women who bear the burden of their absence.

In 2018, Ghazi was named by Amnesty International as one of the "8 kick-ass women standing up for our rights".
