= Institute for Digital Archaeology =

Digital imaging project

The Institute for Digital Archaeology (IDA) is a joint venture between Harvard University, Oxford University, and the Museum of the Future (Dubai) that promotes the development and use of digital imaging techniques in archaeology, epigraphy, art history, and museum conservation. The IDA creates digital archives that aid in interdisciplinary collaboration and the crowdsourcing of research. The IDA was founded in 2012 by Roger Michel.

== Palmyra Arch ==
In April 2016, The IDA erected a temporary full-scale replica of the arch from the Temple of Baalshamin from Palmyra in Trafalgar Square in London. The 20 foot tall marble replica, which weighs around 11 tons, was created from a 3-D computer model of the arch formed by compiling dozens of photographs taken at the site. Robots in Italy then used the 3-D model to carve the marble replica.

== Million Image Database Project ==
The IDA is putting together an open-source Million Image Database. Its aim is to photograph artifacts that are at risk of being destroyed. The images taken before the destruction of sites would be a detailed visual record that could be enough to create a reconstruction. The institute supplied volunteers with 5,000 lightweight 3-D cameras to document at-risk cultural sites throughout the Middle East and North Africa. As of 2015, more than one thousand cameras have been distributed.

== Parthenon Sculptures ==
The Institute for Digital Archaeology is negotiating with the Greek government for permission to create a monumental sculptural replica of the Parthenon sculptures on Mount Pentelicus, near Athens. The project involves carving a 17-metre-high replica of the horse’s head from the chariot of Selene, originally part of the Parthenon’s east pediment. Made from Pentelic marble, the sculpture would be produced using robotic technology, with completion expected to take approximately 18 months at an estimated cost of €1 million.
