= Colonnade =

Row of columns

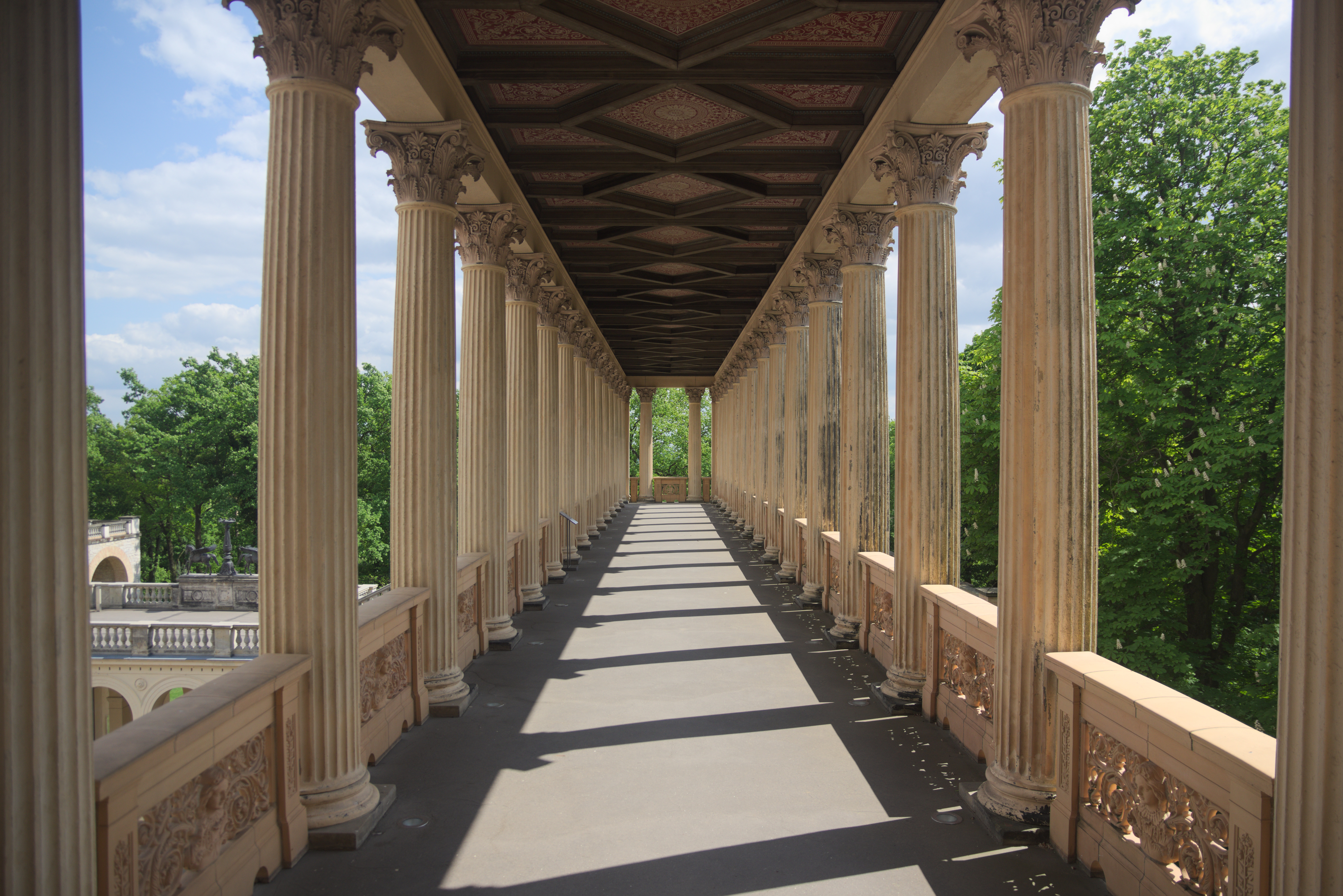
Colonnade at the Belvedere on the Pfingstberg palace in Germany

In classical architecture, a colonnade is a long sequence of columns joined by their entablature, often free-standing, or part of a building. Paired or multiple pairs of columns are normally employed in a colonnade which can be straight or curved. The space enclosed may be covered or open. In St. Peter's Square in Rome, Bernini's great colonnade encloses a vast open elliptical space.

When in front of a building, screening the door (Latin porta), it is called a portico. When enclosing an open court, a peristyle. A portico may be more than one rank of columns deep, as at the Pantheon in Rome or the stoae of Ancient Greece.

When the intercolumniation is alternately wide and narrow, a colonnade may be termed "araeosystyle" (Gr. αραιος, "widely spaced", and συστυλος, "with columns set close together"), as in the case of the western porch of St Paul's Cathedral and the east front of the Louvre.

== History ==
Colonnades (formerly as colonade) have been built since ancient times and interpretations of the classical model have continued through to modern times, and Neoclassical styles remained popular for centuries. At the British Museum, for example, porticos are continued along the front as a colonnade. The porch of columns that surrounds the Lincoln Memorial in Washington, D.C., (in style a peripteral classical temple) can be termed a colonnade. As well as the traditional use in buildings and monuments, colonnades are used in sports stadiums such as the Harvard Stadium in Boston, where the entire horseshoe-shaped stadium is topped by a colonnade. The longest colonnade in the United States, with 36 Corinthian columns, is the New York State Education Building in Albany, New York.

== Notable colonnades ==
=== Ancient world ===
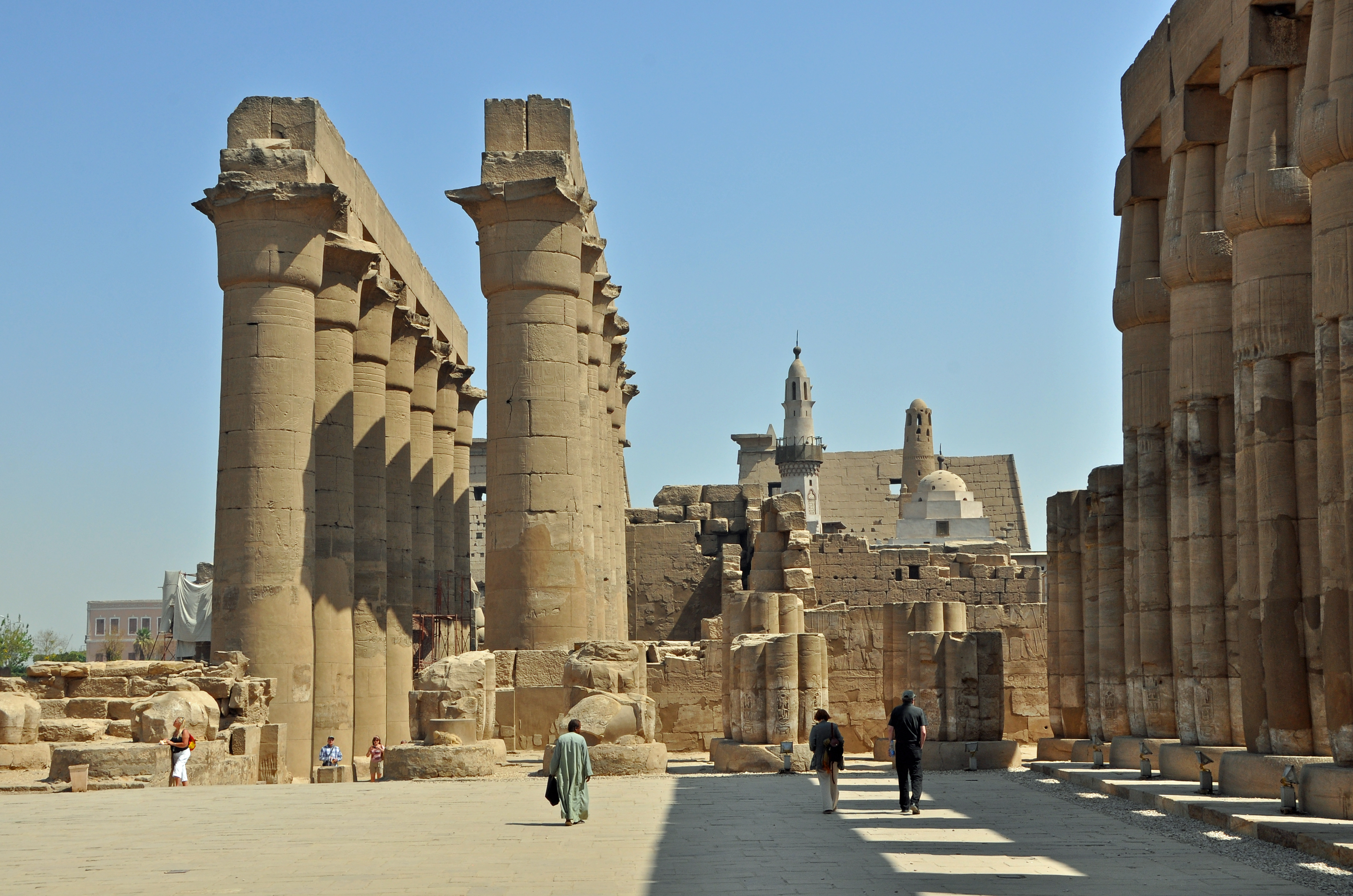
The colonnade of Amenhotep III at the Luxor temple

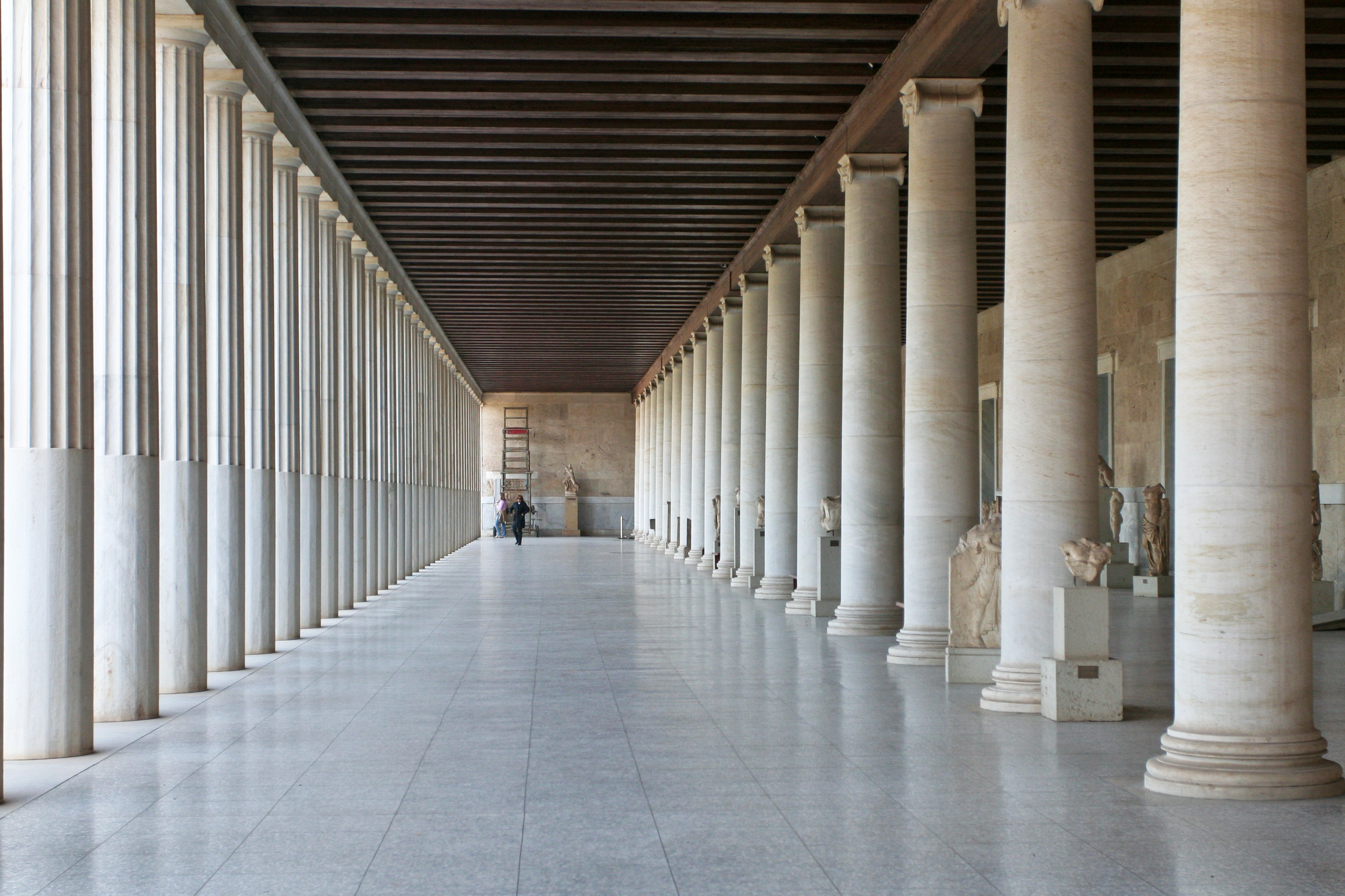
The Stoa of Attalos in the reconstructed Ancient Agora of Athens

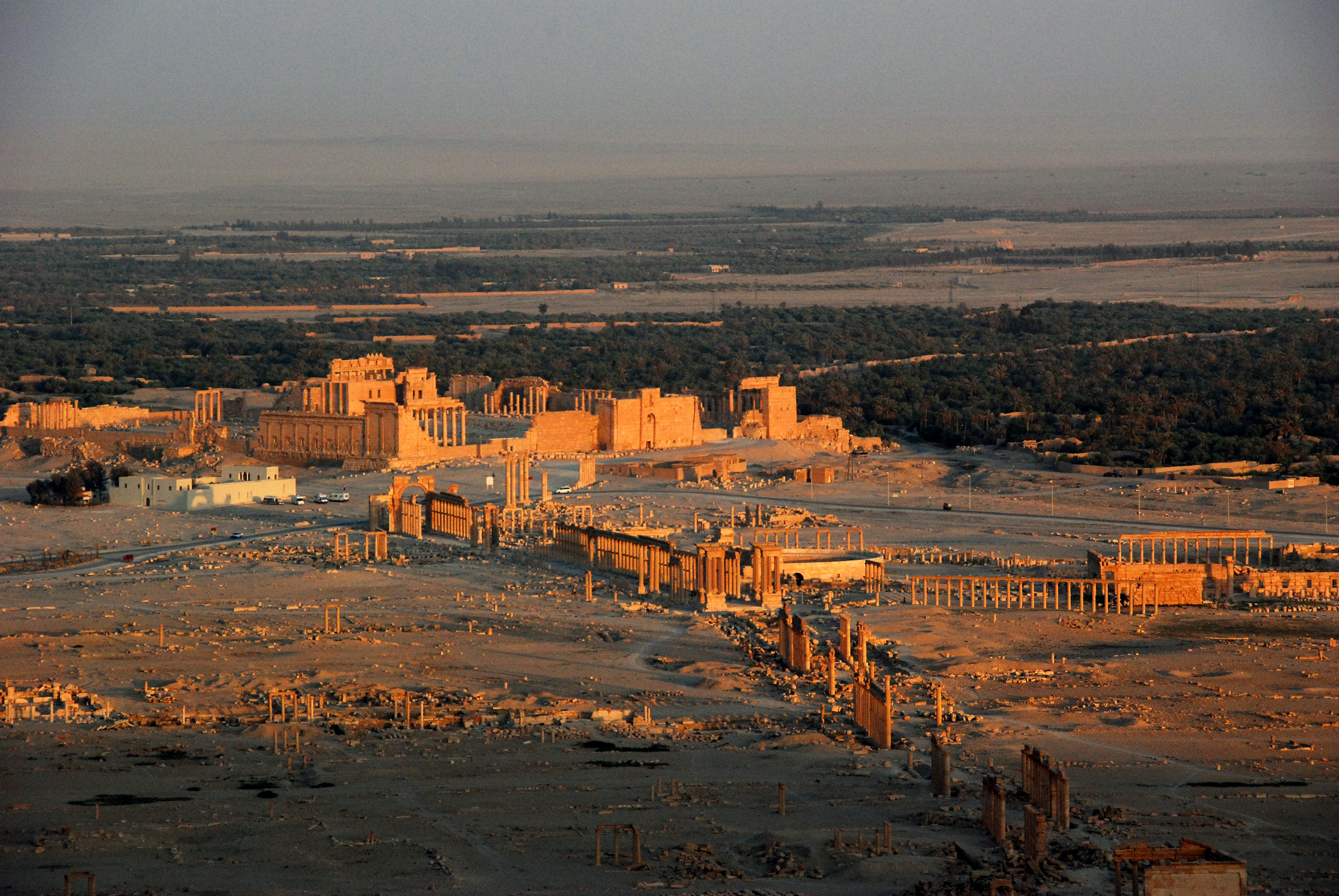
The Great Colonnade at Palmyra, Syria

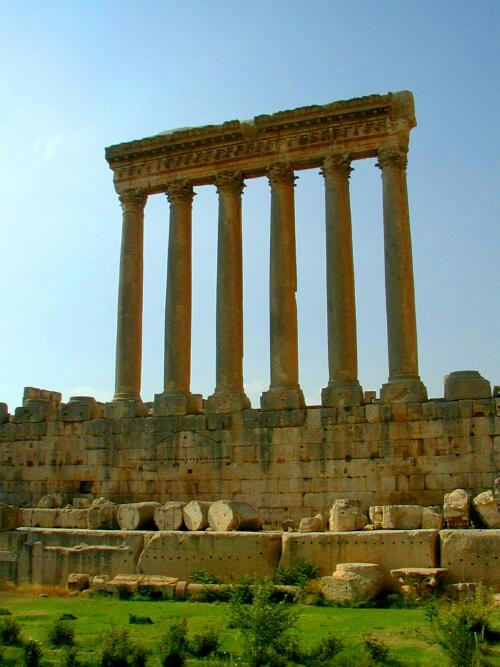
Baalbeck, Lebanon

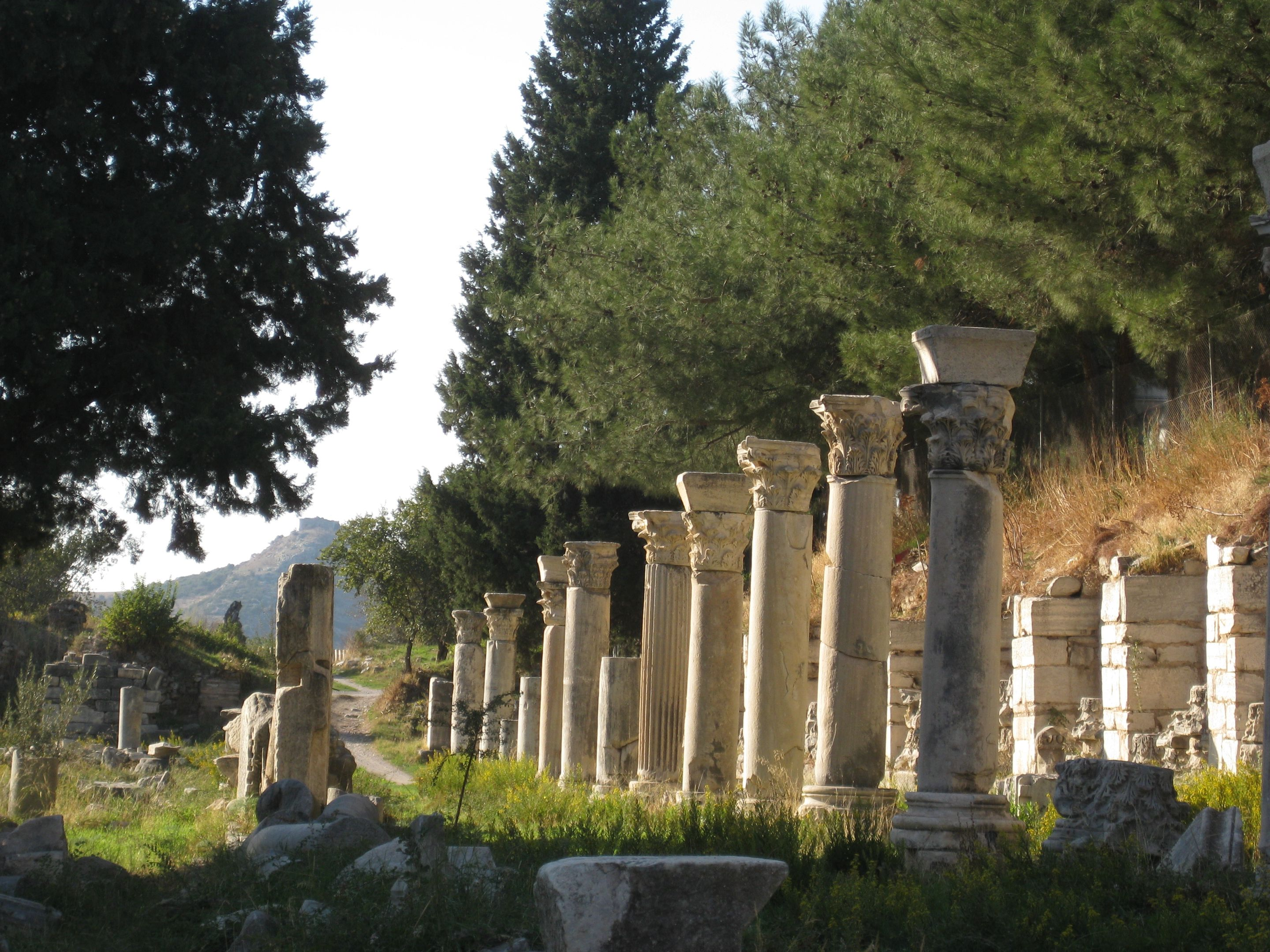
Ephesus

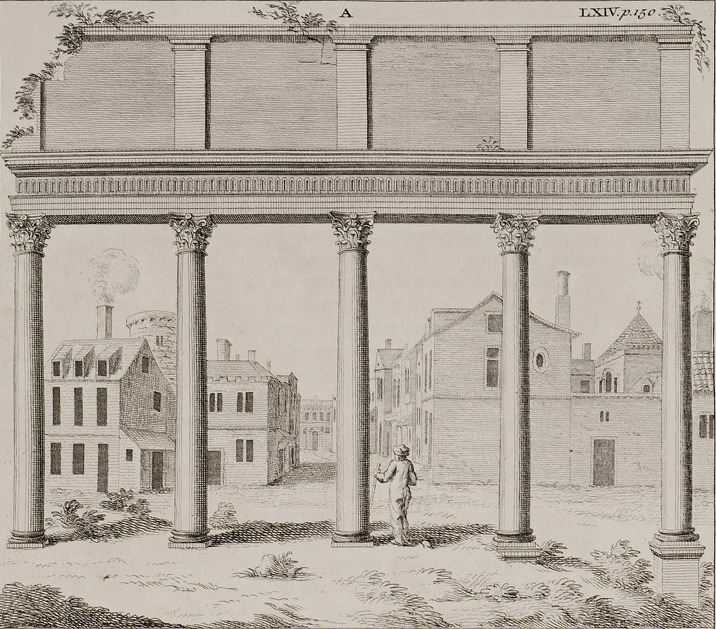
Las Incantadas colonnade, demolished in 1864 by Emmanuel Miller

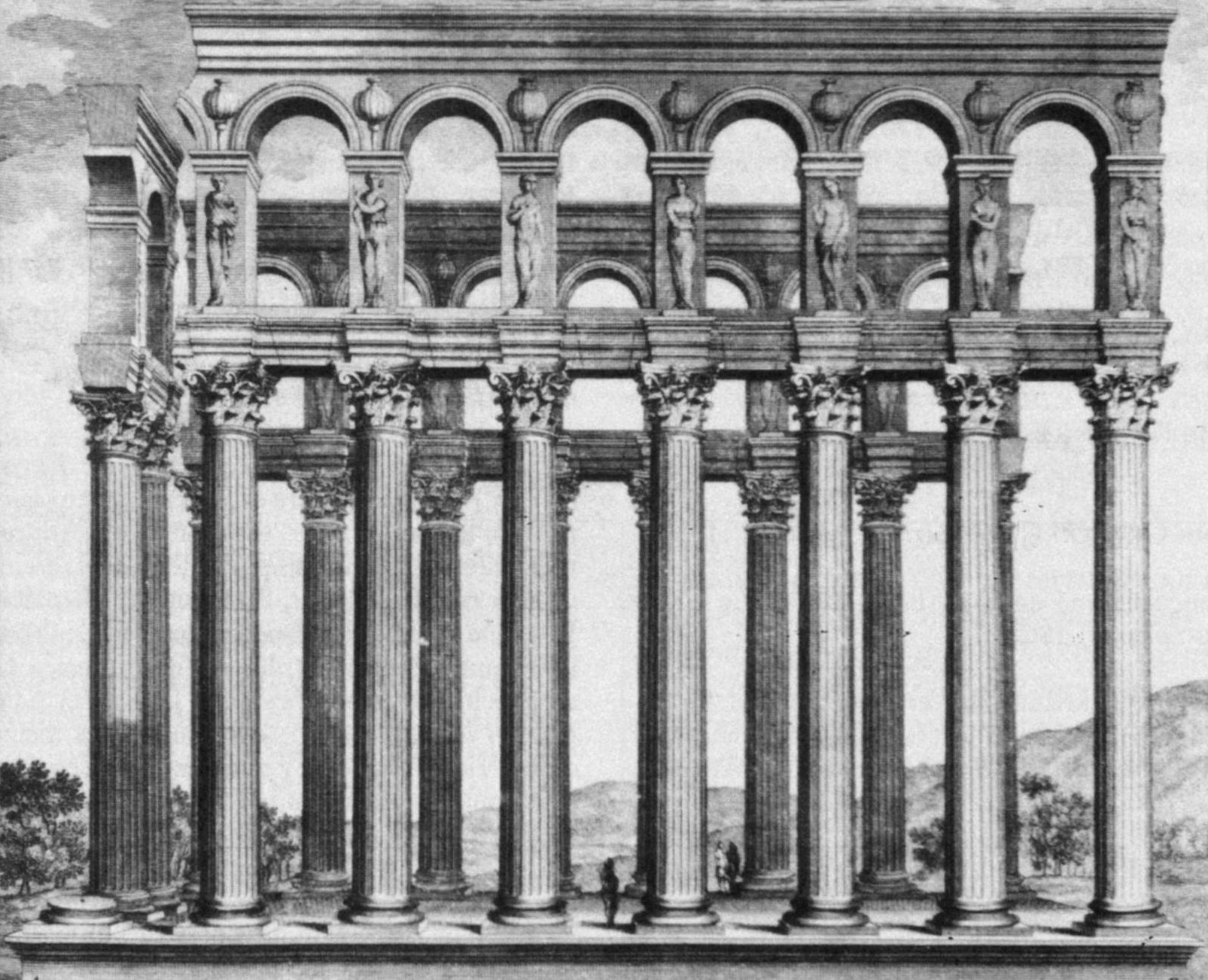
Piliers de Tutelle, Gallo-Roman portico demolished in 1677, France

=== Renaissance and Baroque periods ===
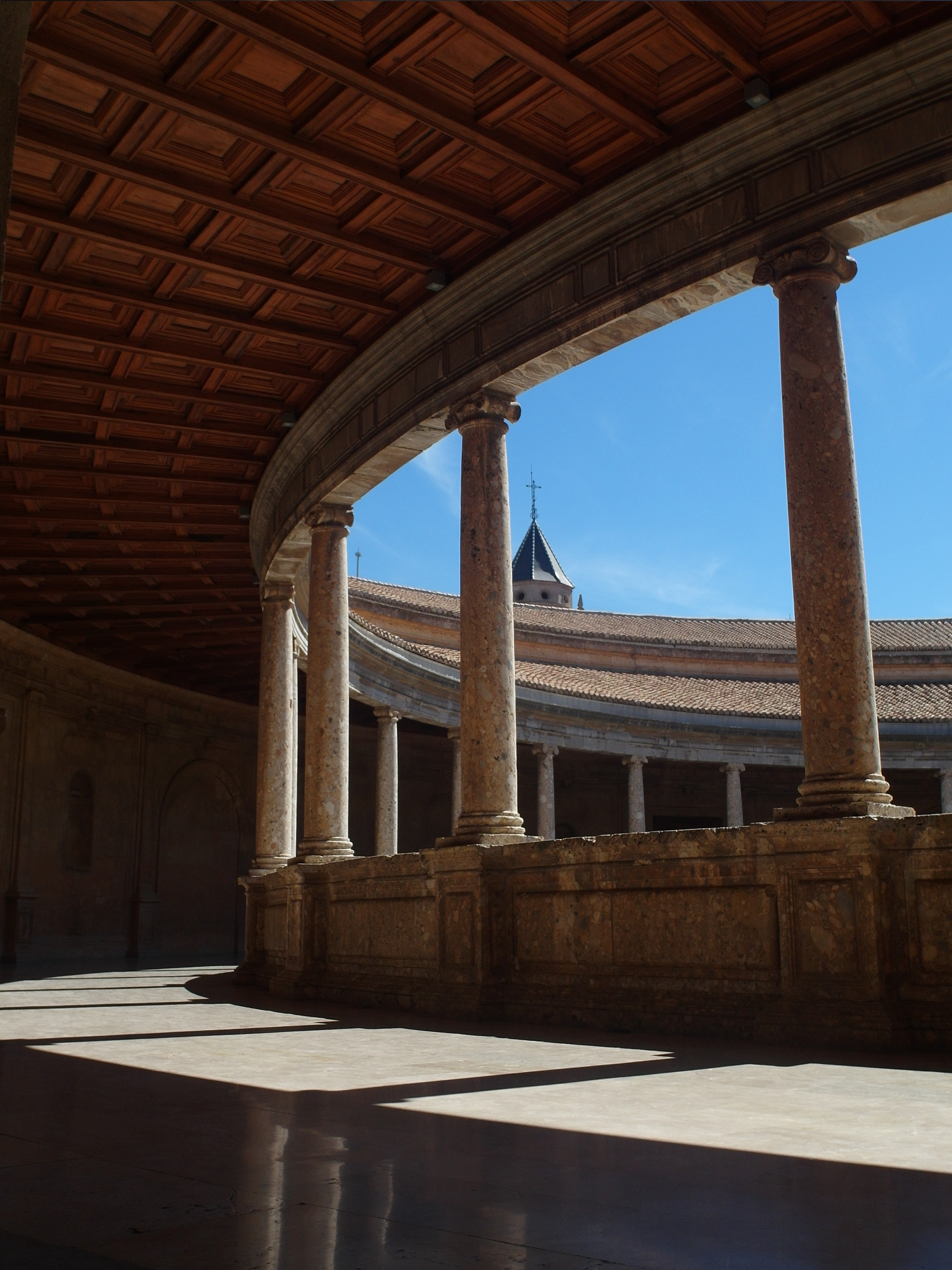
Palace of Charles V, Granada (1527)

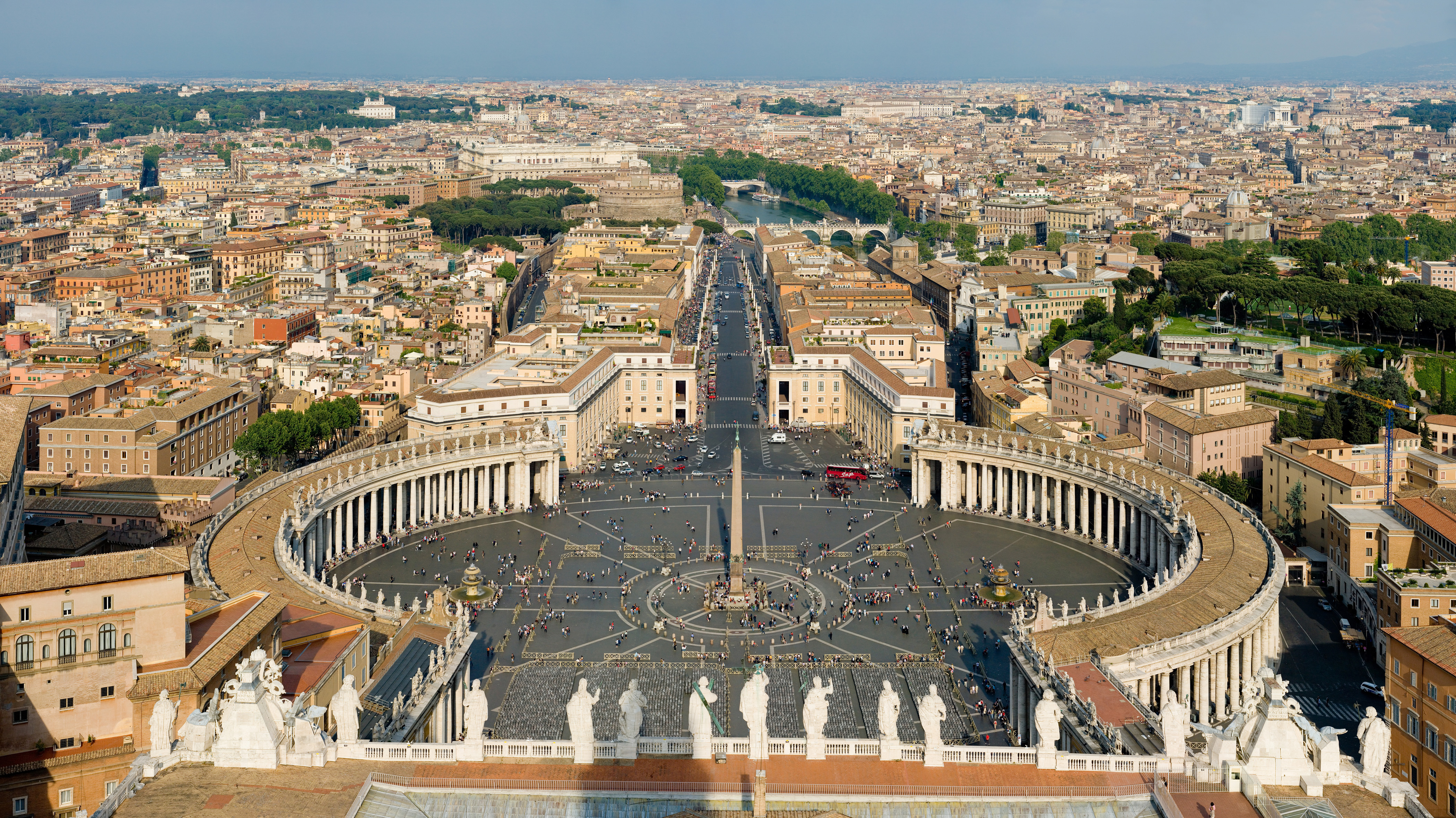
Bernini's colonnade St. Peter's Square, Vatican City (1660s)

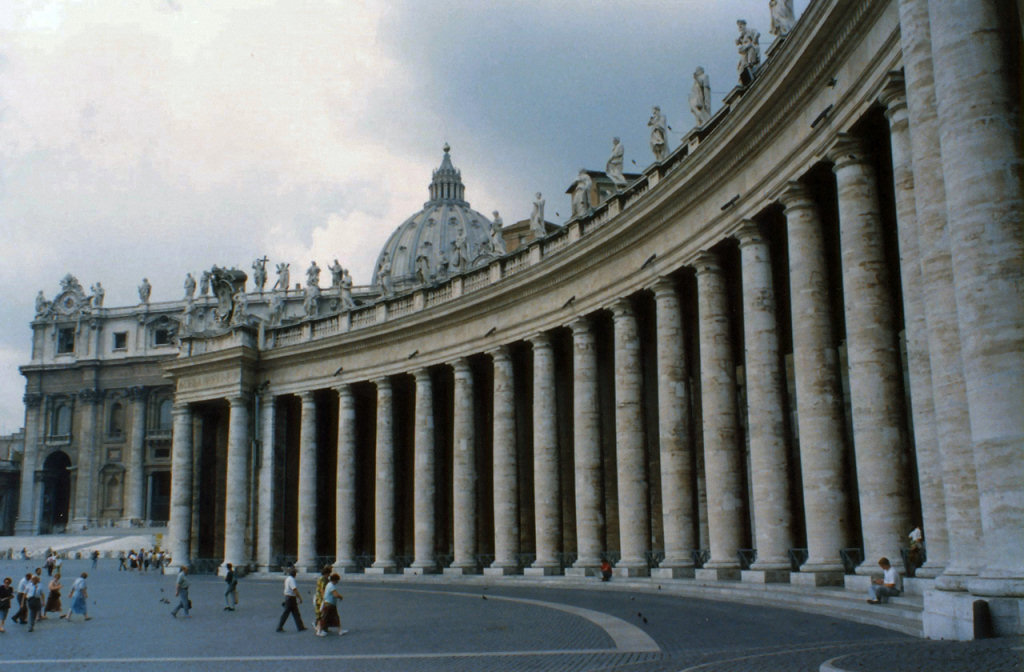
Detail of St. Peter's Square colonnade

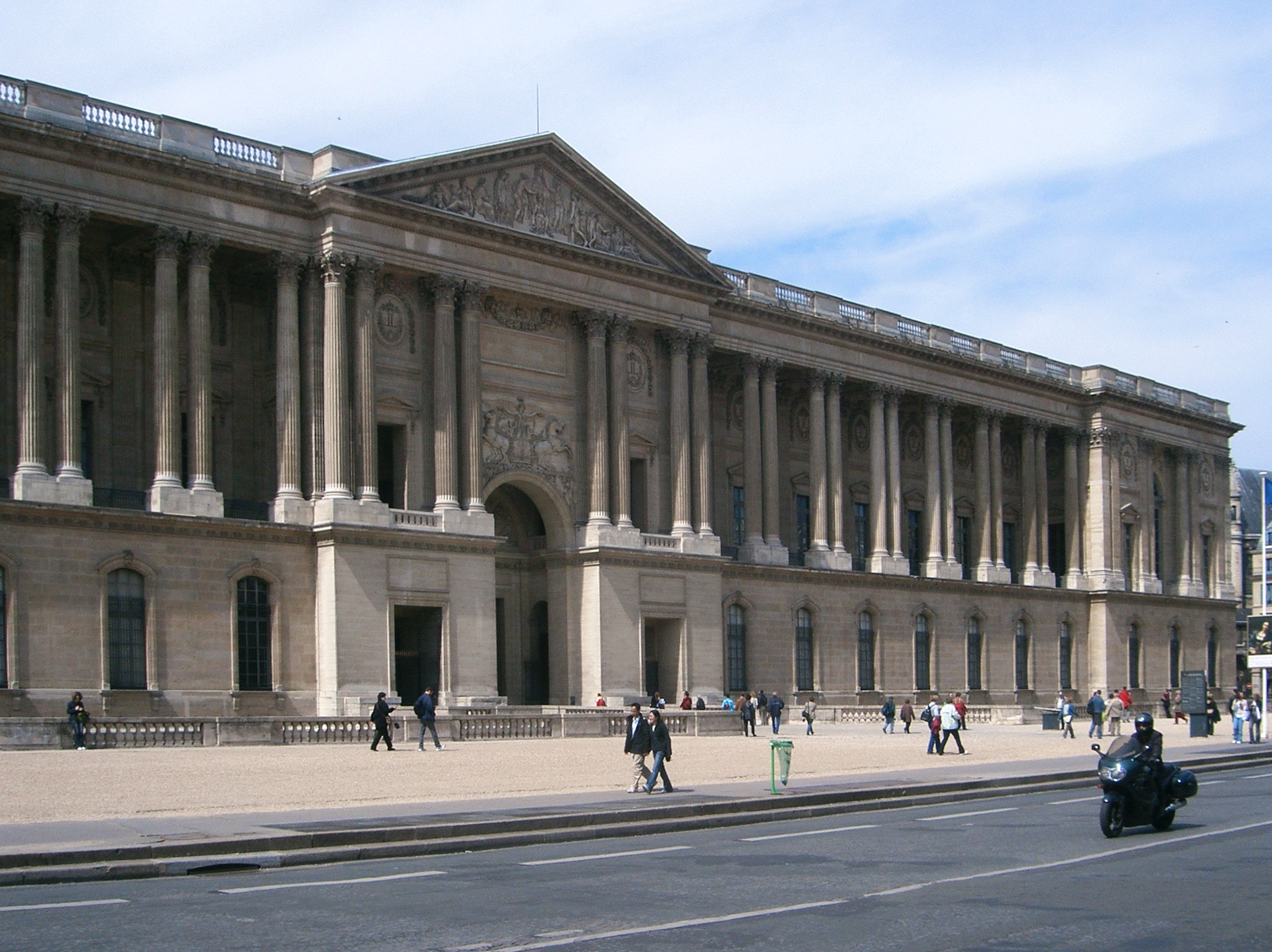
Colonnade of the Louvre, Paris (1670)

=== Neoclassical ===
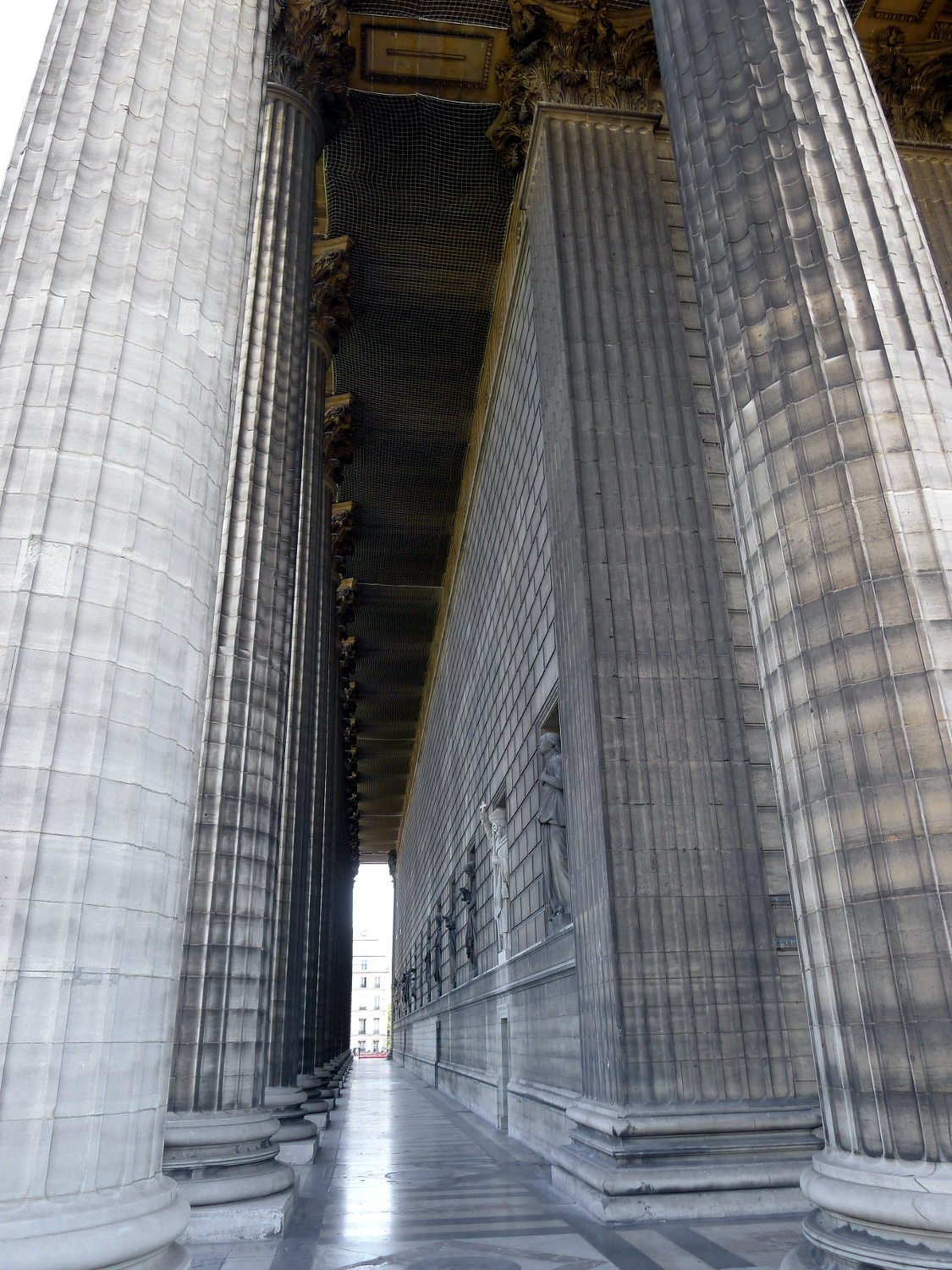
The church of La Madeleine, Paris (consecrated 1842)

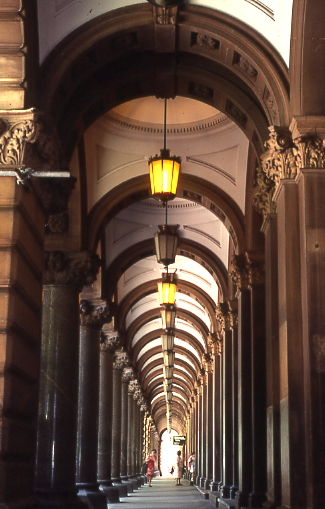
Vaulted colonnade in the General Post Office, Sydney (1890s)

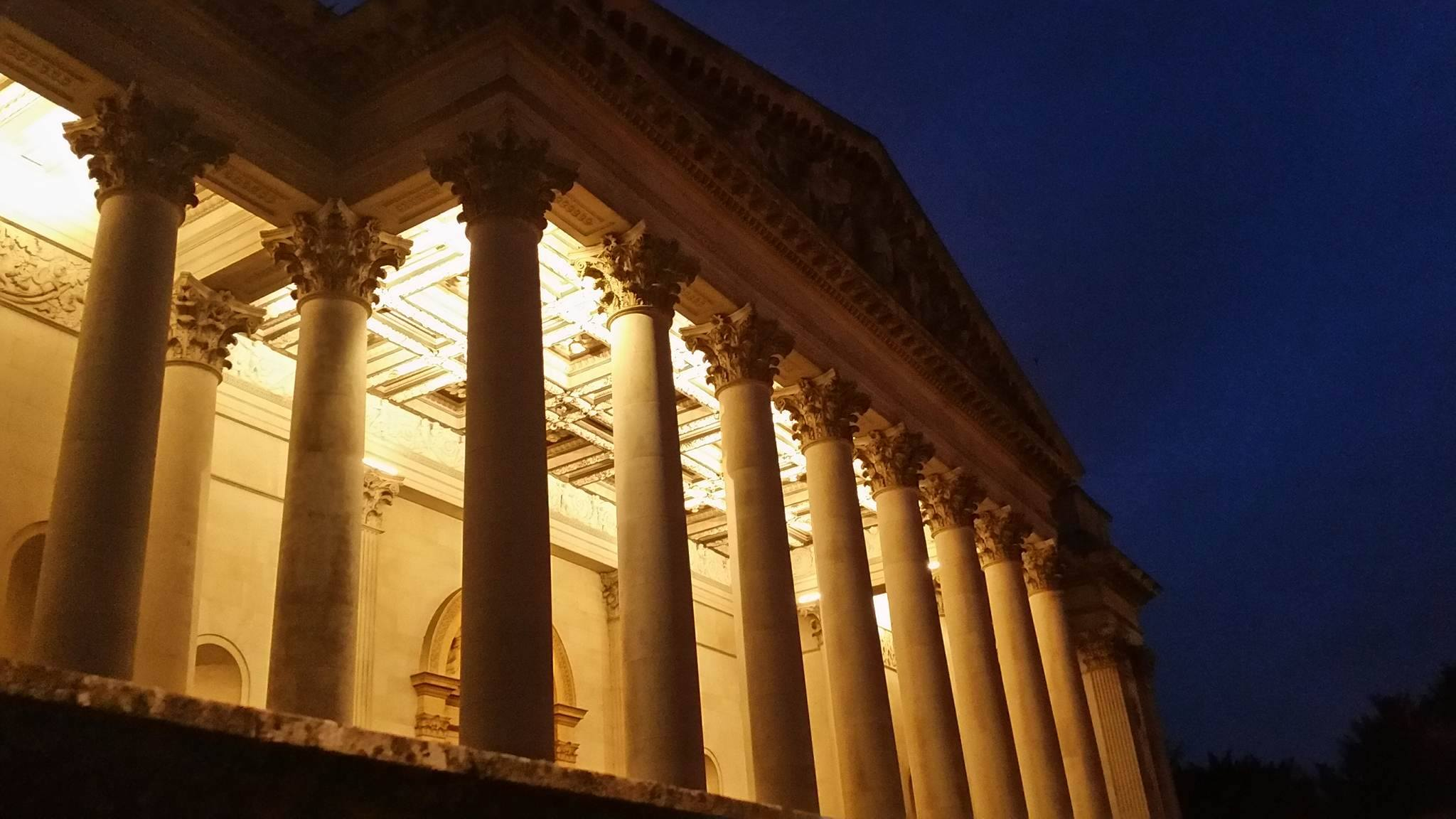
Main entrance to the Fitzwilliam Museum, University of Cambridge (19th century)

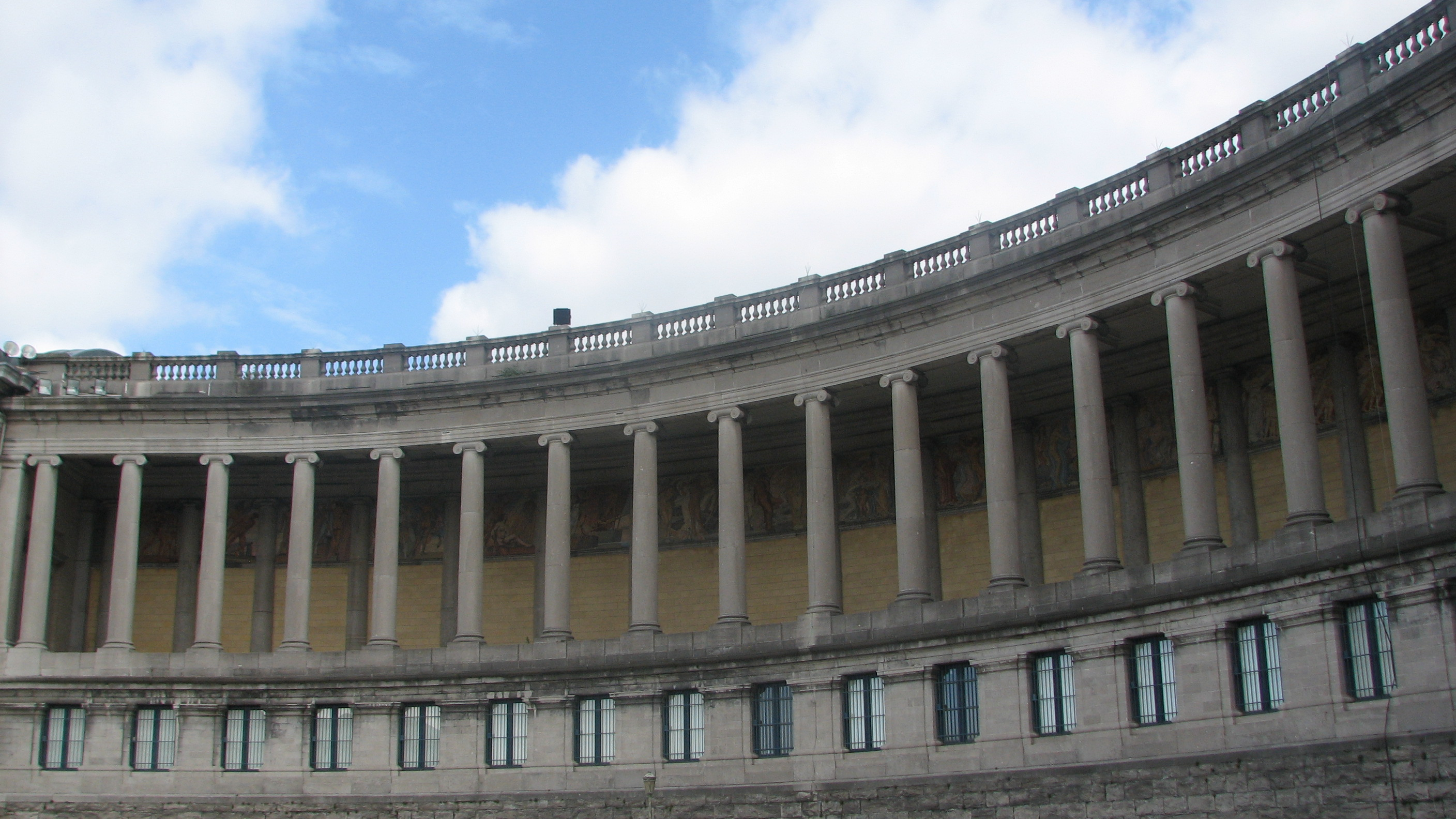
Colonnade of the Arcade du Cinquantenaire, Brussels (1905)

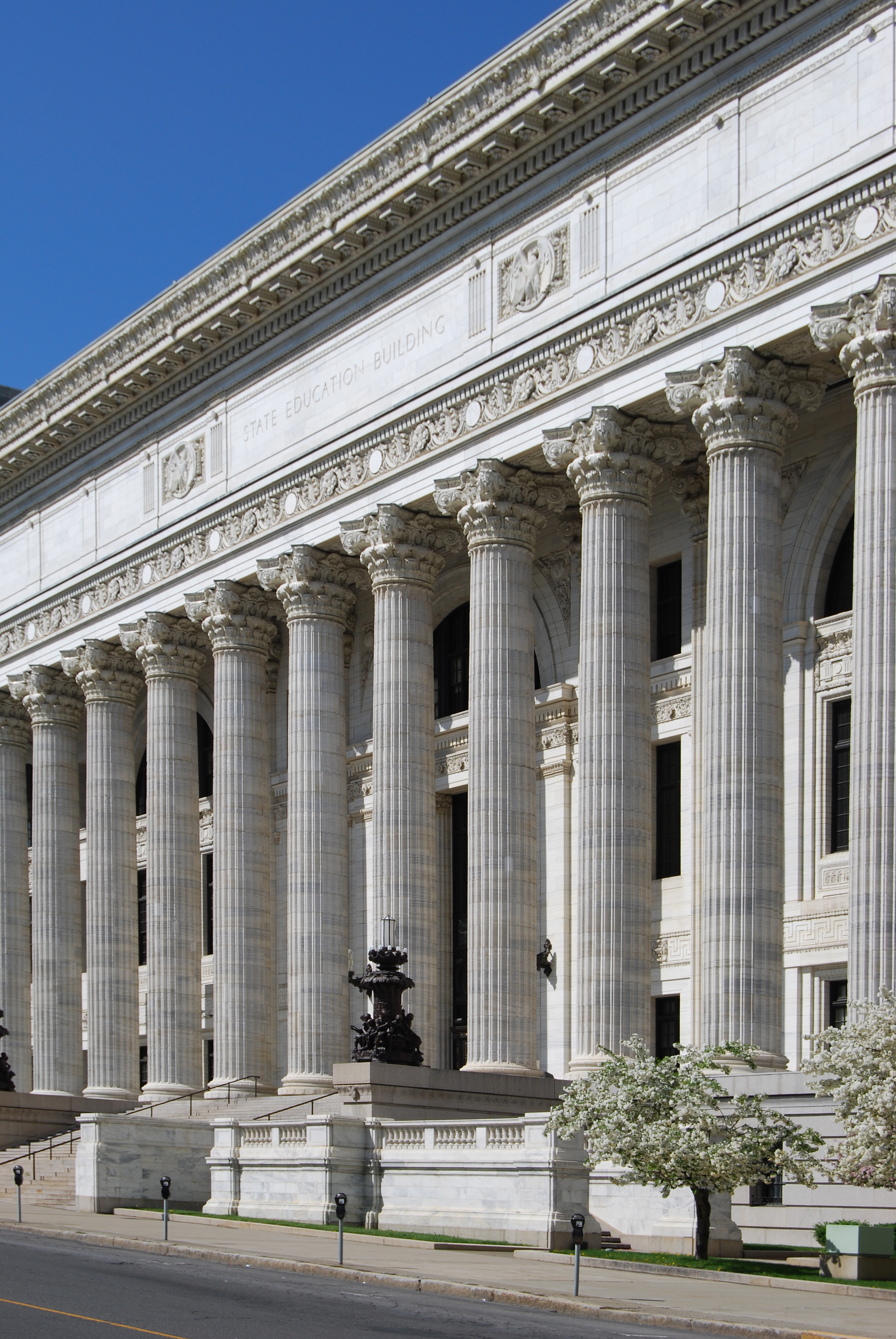
New York State Education Building, Albany, New York (1912)

=== Modern interpretations ===
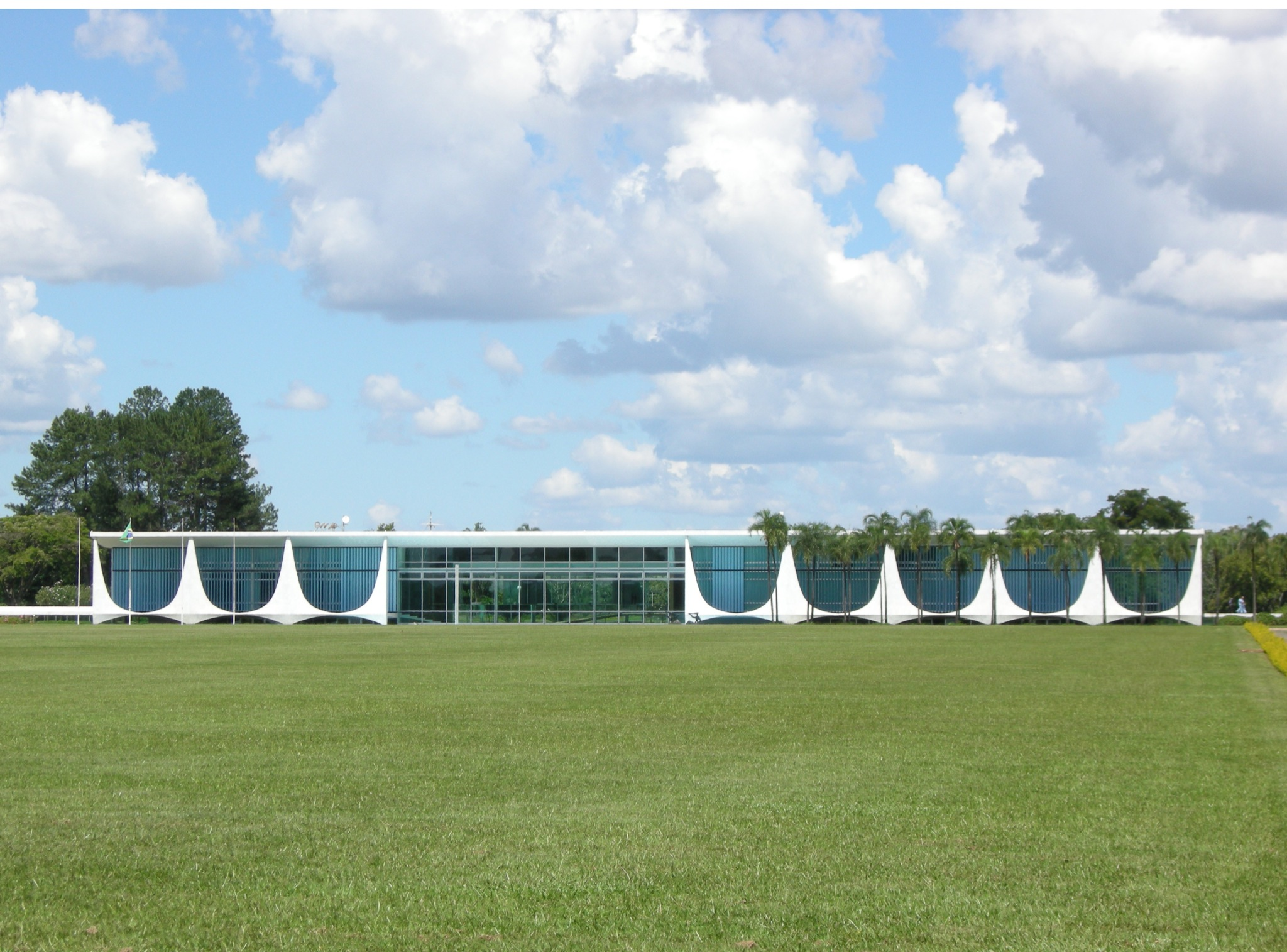
Palácio da Alvorada, by Oscar Niemeyer, in Brasília, Brazil (1958)

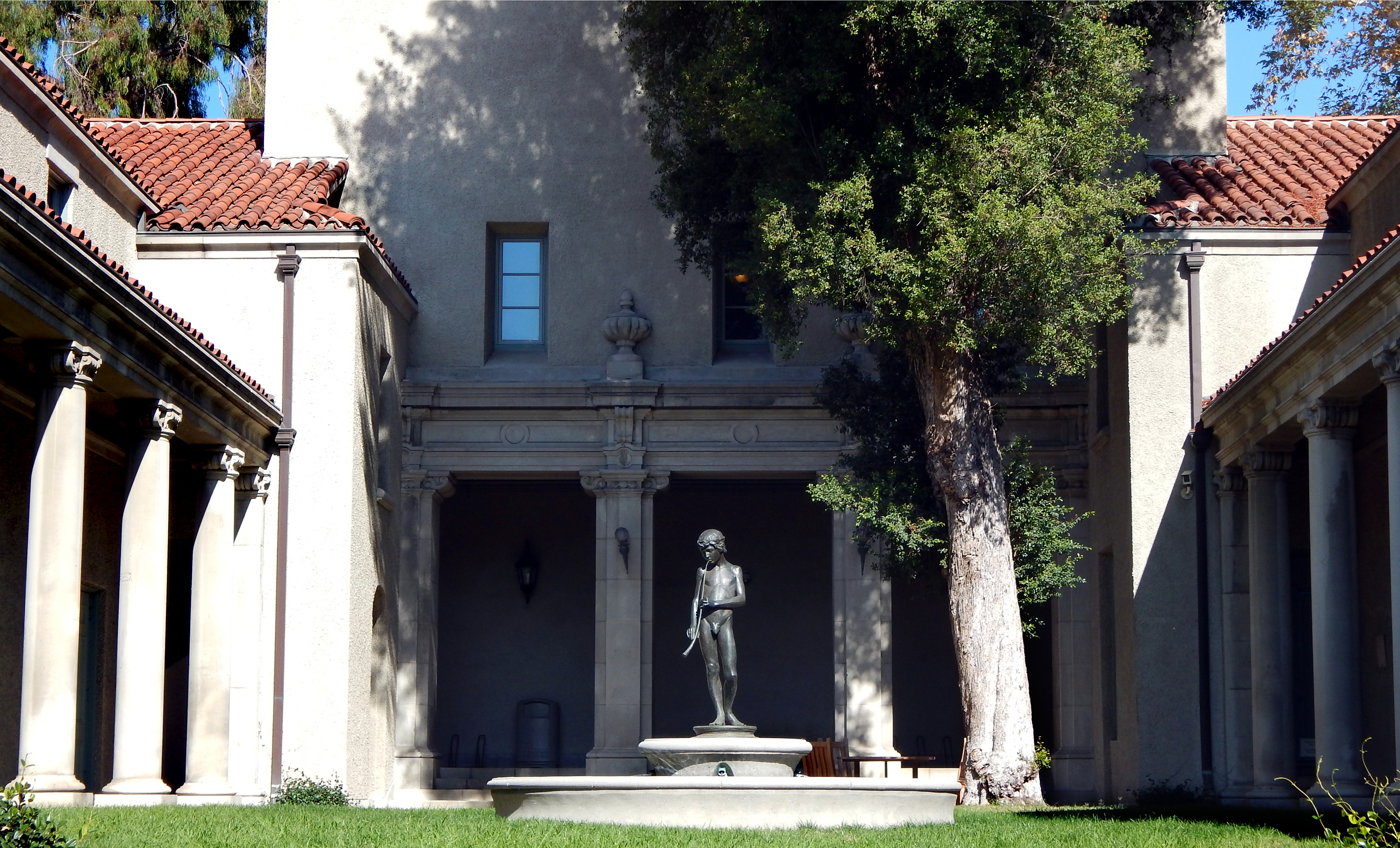
Lebus Court, Bridges Hall of Music, Pomona College, by Myron Hunt in Claremont, California, United States (1915)

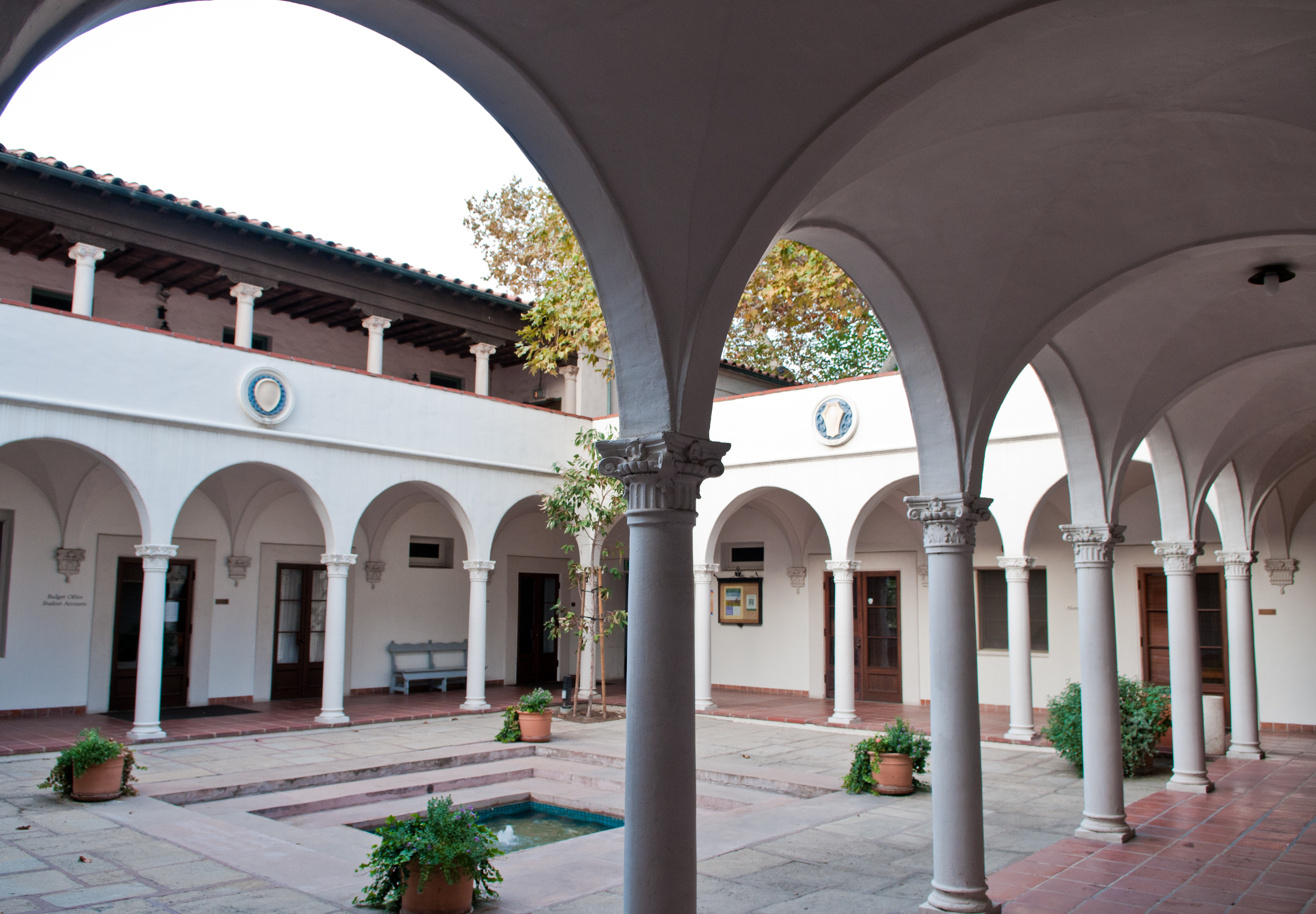
Balch Hall, Scripps College by Sumner Hunt and Gordon Kaufmann in Claremont, California, United States (1929)

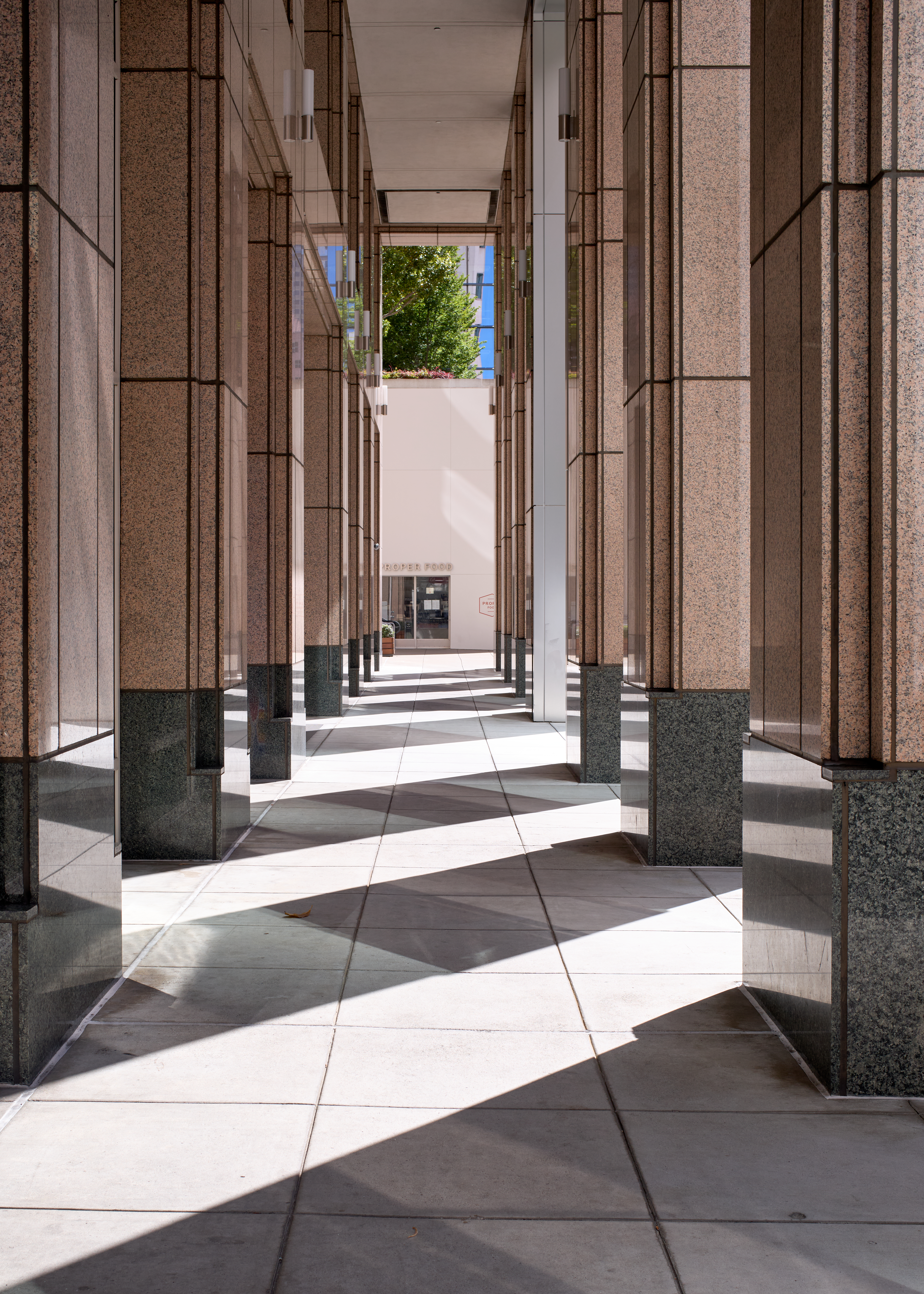
Colonnade on the corner of Mission and First in downtown San Francisco

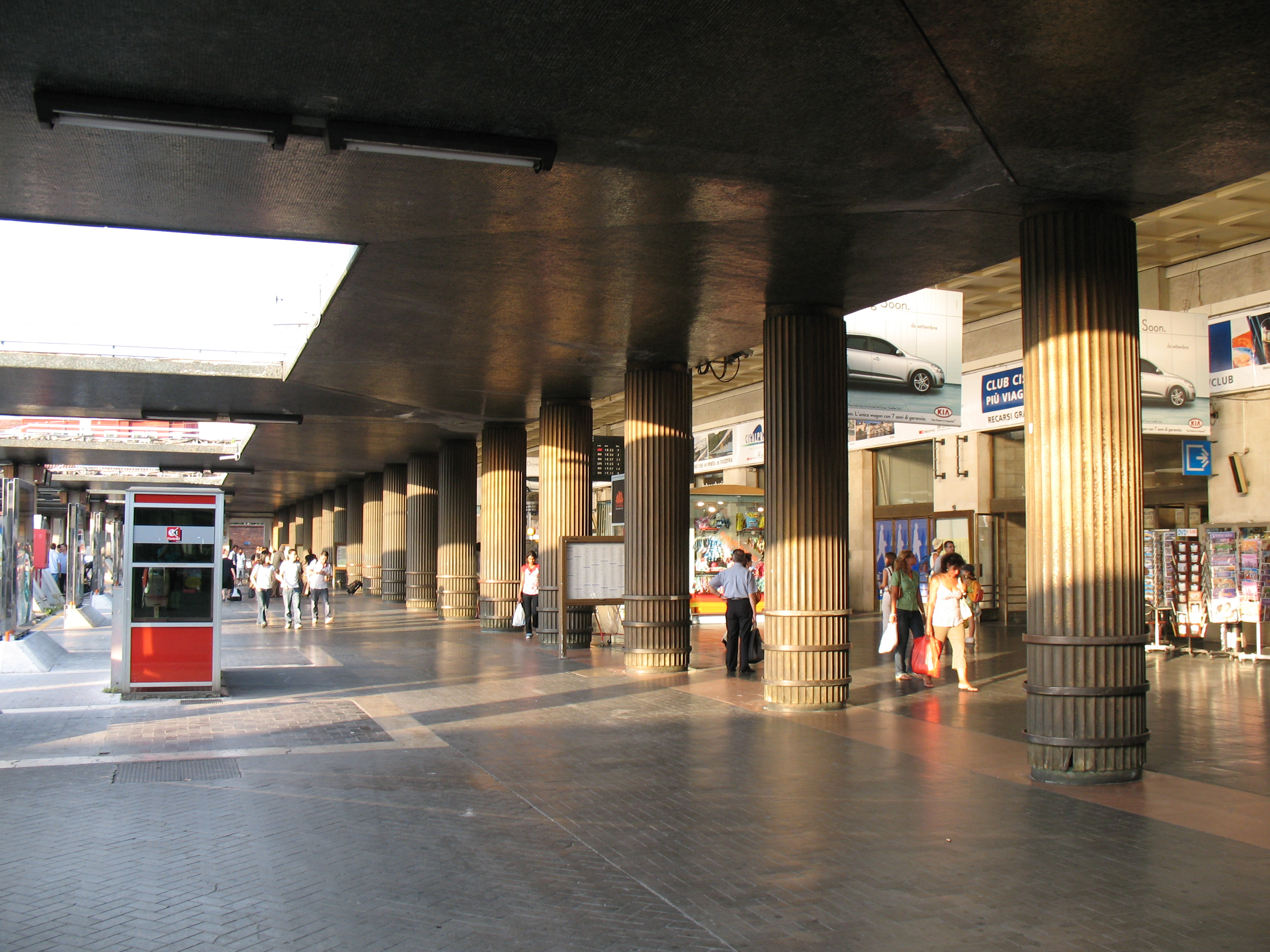
Modern colonnade at the Santa Lucia rail station, Venice

== See also ==
- Arcade
- Cloister
- Engaged column
