= Great Colonnade at Palmyra =

Ancient ruin in Syria

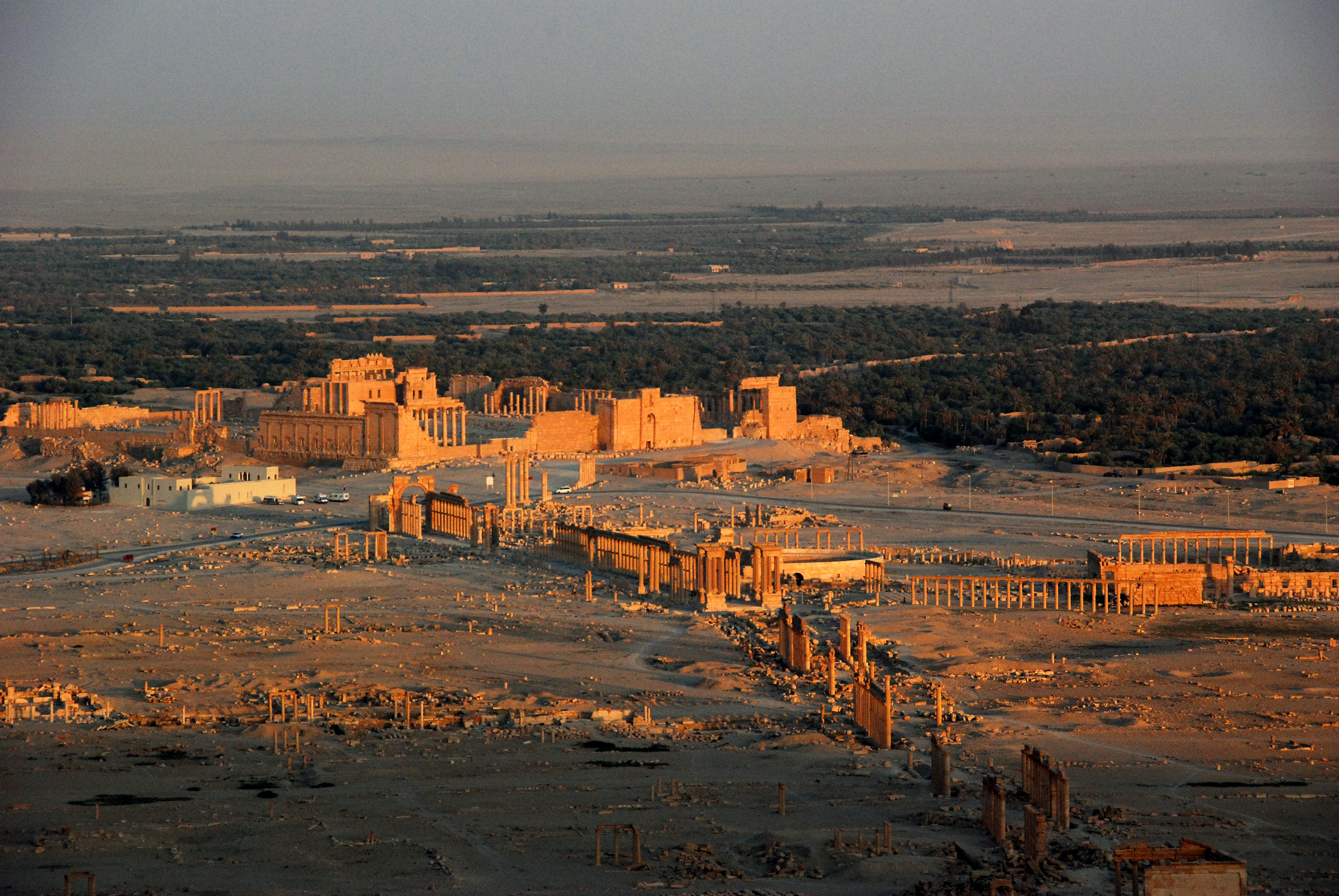
- Overview of the Great Colonnade

- Location within Syria
- 34°33′02″N 38°16′07″E
- Type: Colonnade
- Periods: Roman, Palmyrene
- Location: Palmyra, Syria

Site notes
- Length: 1,200 metres (3,900 ft)
- Condition: restored
- Owner: Public
- Public access: Inaccessible (in a war zone)

UNESCO World Heritage Site
- Type: Cultural
- Criteria: i, ii, iv
- Designated: 1980 (4th session)
- Part of: Site of Palmyra
- Reference no.: 23
- Region: Arab States
- Endangered: 2013–present

The Great Colonnade at Palmyra was the main colonnaded avenue in the ancient city of Palmyra in the Syrian Desert. The colonnade was built in several stages during the second and third century CE and stretched for more than a kilometer (approximately .75 miles). It linked the Temple of Bel, in the southeastern end of the city, to the West Gate and the Funerary Temple in the northwestern part.

The colonnade was damaged during the Syrian Civil War, especially when Palmyra was occupied by the Islamic State of Iraq and the Levant from May 2015 to March 2016. However, large parts of it are still intact.

== Overview ==
The colonnade consists of three sections that were built separately over the course of the second and third century CE. The western stretch of the colonnade is the oldest and started at the West Gate near the Funerary Temple. The eastern section stretched from the Monumental Arch in the center of the town to the entrance of the Temple of Bel. The middle section was built last to connect the two separate colonnades. It met the western stretch at the Great Tetrapylon, and the eastern stretch at the Monumental Arch.

=== Western section ===
The western colonnade was the first section to be built. Palmyrene inscriptions found on some columns confirm that works started before 158 CE. The straight avenue ran in northwest-southeast direction and stretched for 500 metres (1,600 ft), the longest of the three sectors. The main avenue's width was 11.7 metres (38 ft) while the side streets were 7 metres (23 ft) in width. The colonnade's western terminus, the West Gate, was built in the late second-century CE. The avenue also connected in a right angle to the Transverse Colonnade which stretched to the Damascus Gate in the south.

=== Eastern section ===
The eastern sector of the Great Colonnade started at the Monumental Arch and stretched in a northwest-southeast direction towards the propylaea of the Temple of Bel. Work on the colonnade started after the completion of the propylaea in 175 CE and continued through the beginning of the third-century CE. This section is the widest of the Great Colonnade with a uniform width of 22.7 metres (74 ft) for the main street and 6.7 metres (22 ft) for the sidewalks. A corner of the temenos of the Temple of Nebu was demolished to allow the colonnade an uninterrupted line of sight towards the Monumental Arch from the west and a wider access to the section leading to the Temple of Bel. A nymphaeum was later added to the eastern colonnade between the Bel and Nebu temples.

=== Middle section ===
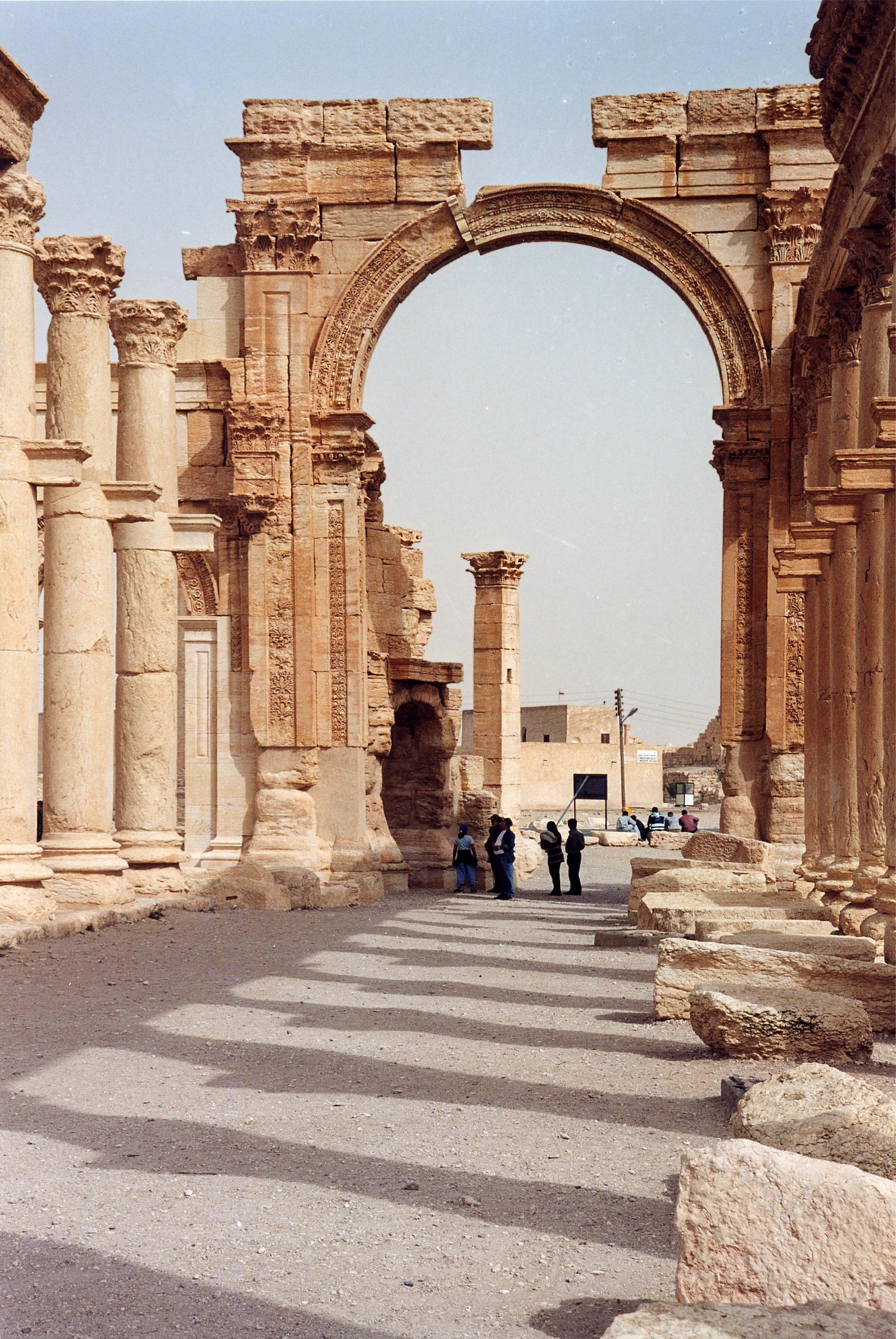
The Great Colonnade and the Monumental Arch.

The middle colonnade, stretching from east to west, was constructed to connect the two earlier colonnades. Work on the central avenue began from the Monumental Arch, where it met the eastern colonnade, sometime in the early third-century CE. The section stretched until the Great Tetrapylon where it met the western colonnade in an oval plaza. The central colonnade also incorporated the portico of the baths. The central section of the Great Colonnade became the most important with several civic buildings clustered around it, including the caesareum, the theatre, the baths and the Temple of Nebu. The width of the main street varies from 14 metres (46 ft) at its widest near the tetrapylon, to 10 metres (33 ft) when it reaches the Monumental Arch. The sidewalks also vary in width between 6.3–7 metres (21–23 ft) for the northern sidewalk and 6.8–8.95 metres (22.3–29.4 ft) for the southern one.

== Architecture and significance ==
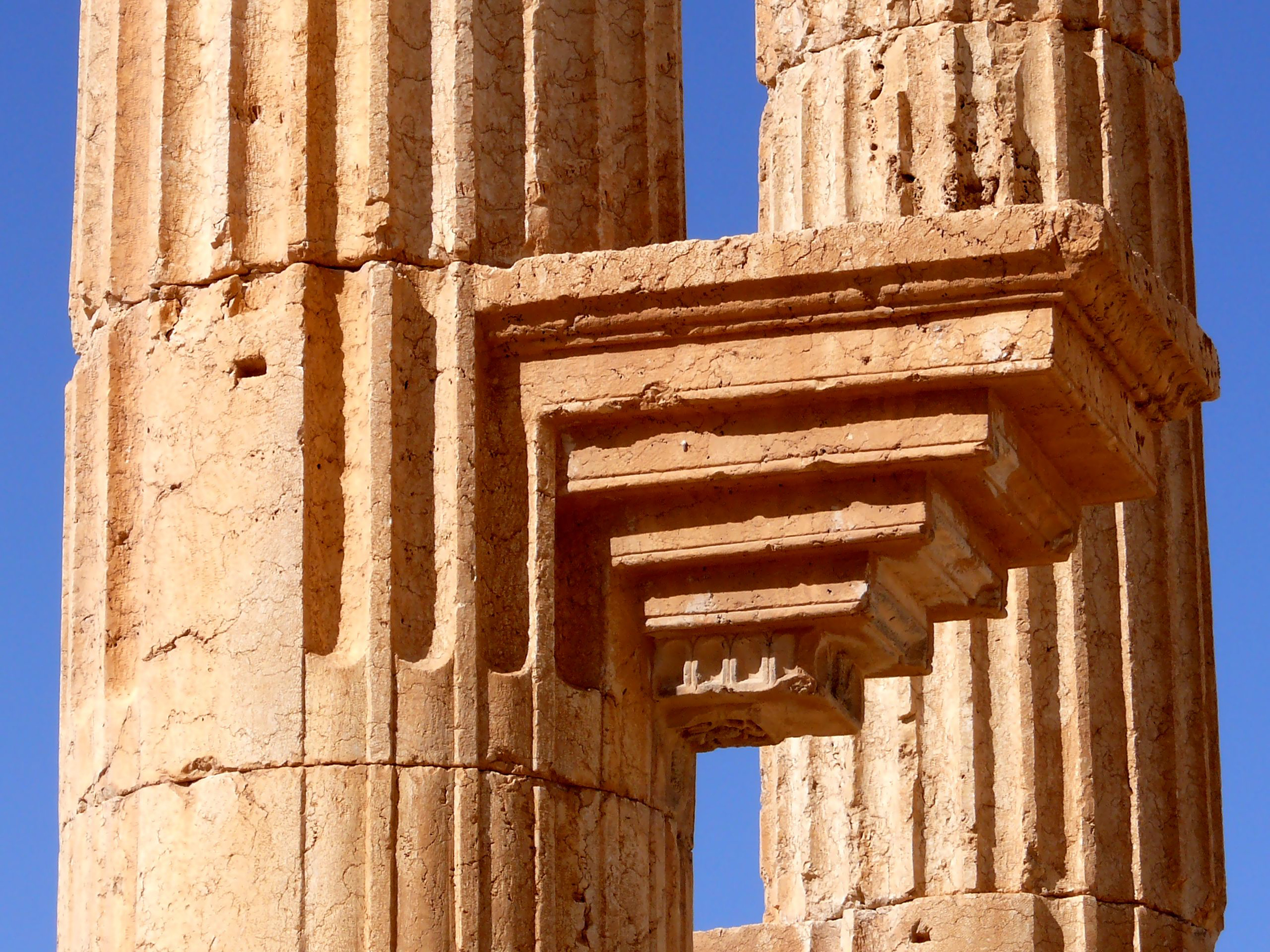
A bracket fixed on one of the columns of the colonnade

The colonnade's early columns, especially in the western stretch, were built using the classical opus emplectum building technique. The columns consisted of six to eight short sections. This technique was gradually replaced, from the 220s, by what historian Marek Barański termed opus Palmyrenum. The newer technique, seen in the middle and eastern stretches of the colonnade, utilized three long segments instead of the short drums. The technique allowed for significantly faster construction at the time.

The Corinthian columns were fitted with decorated brackets that bore dedicatory inscriptions. The brackets were used to hold bronze statues of important figures. Dedicatory inscriptions to Zenobia and Odaenathus dating to between 257 and 267 were discovered on columns set up in front of the theatre.

== Gallery ==
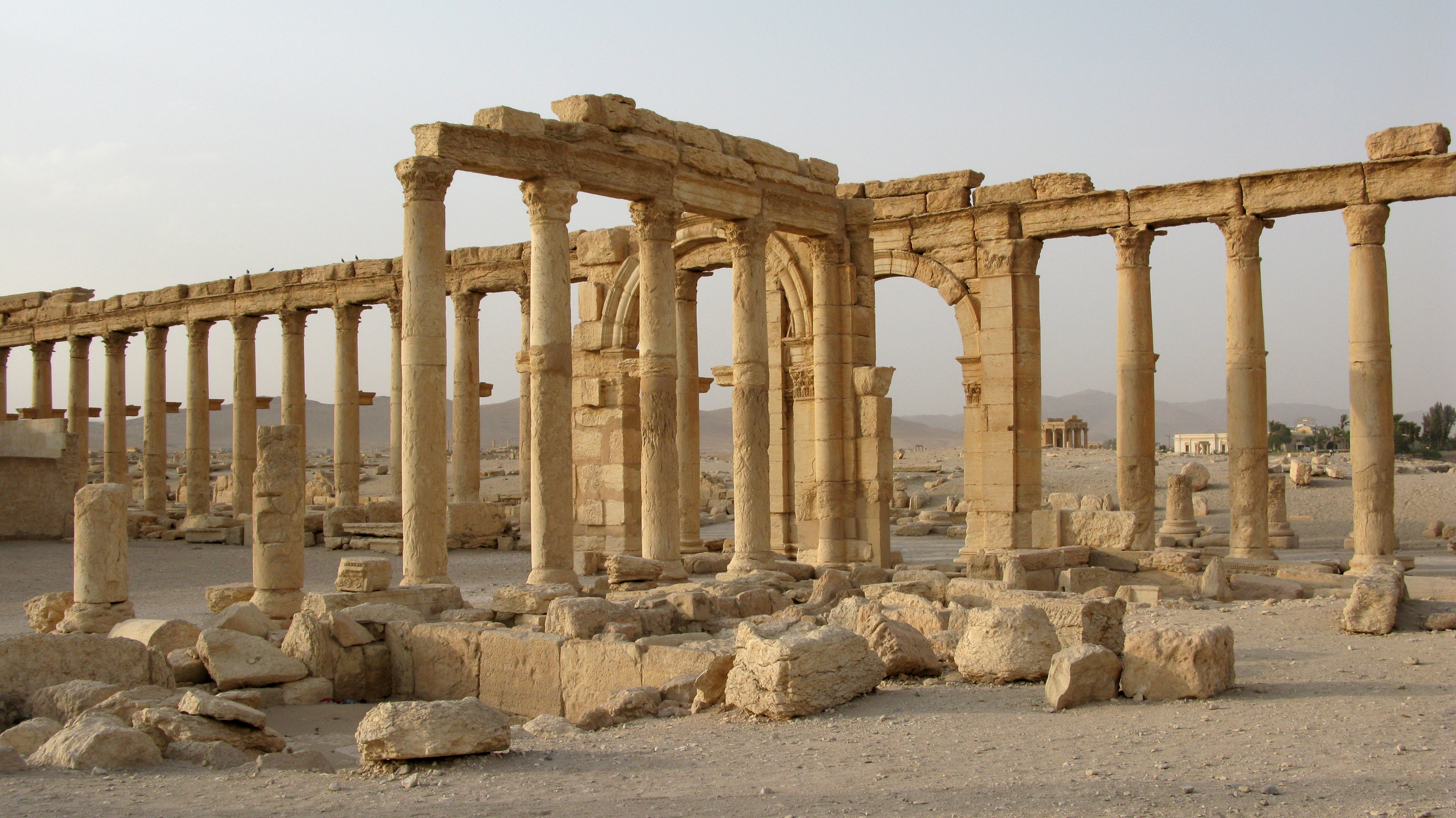
Sections of the Great Colonnade

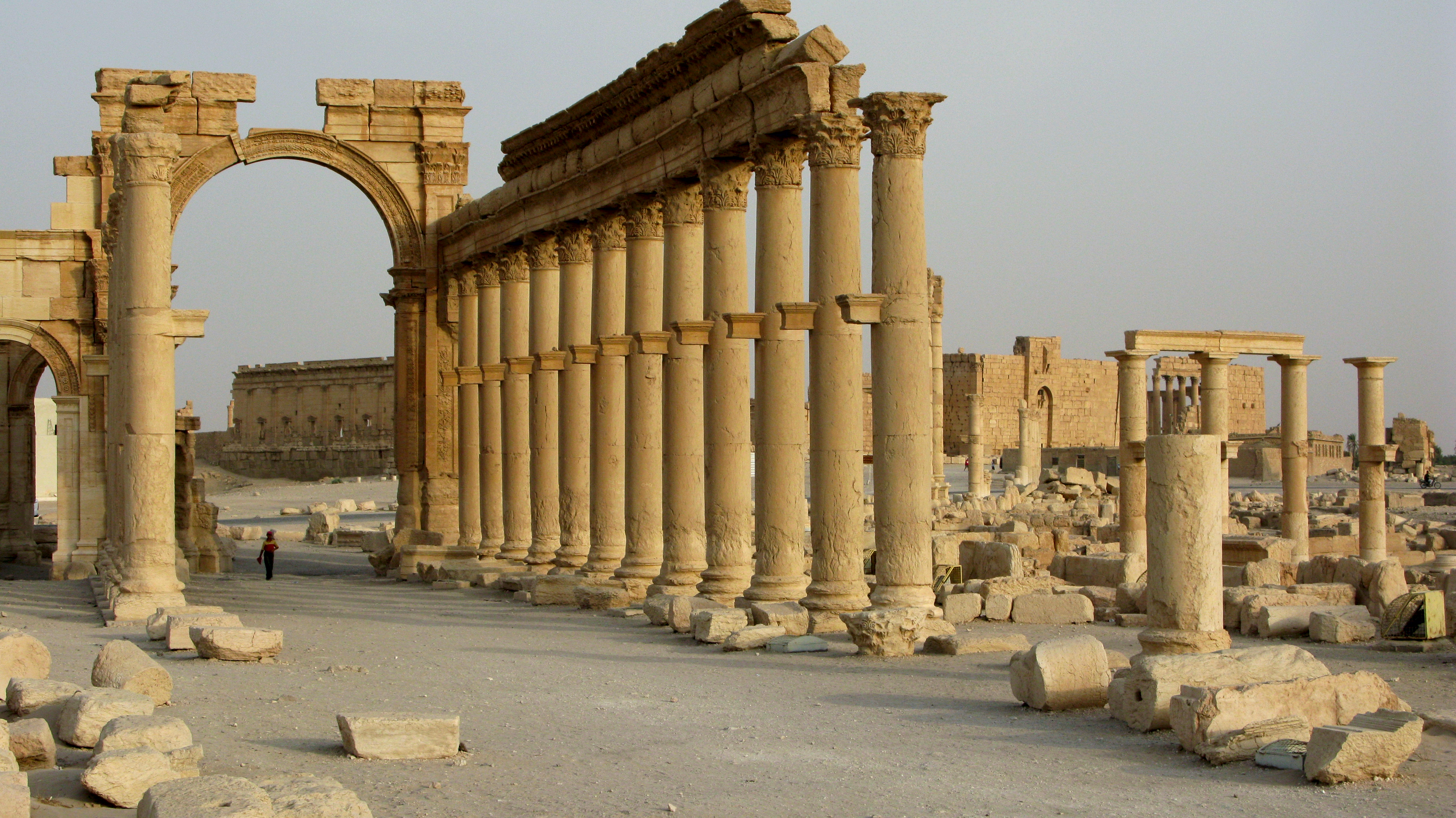
The Monumental Arch linking the east and central sections of the colonnade.

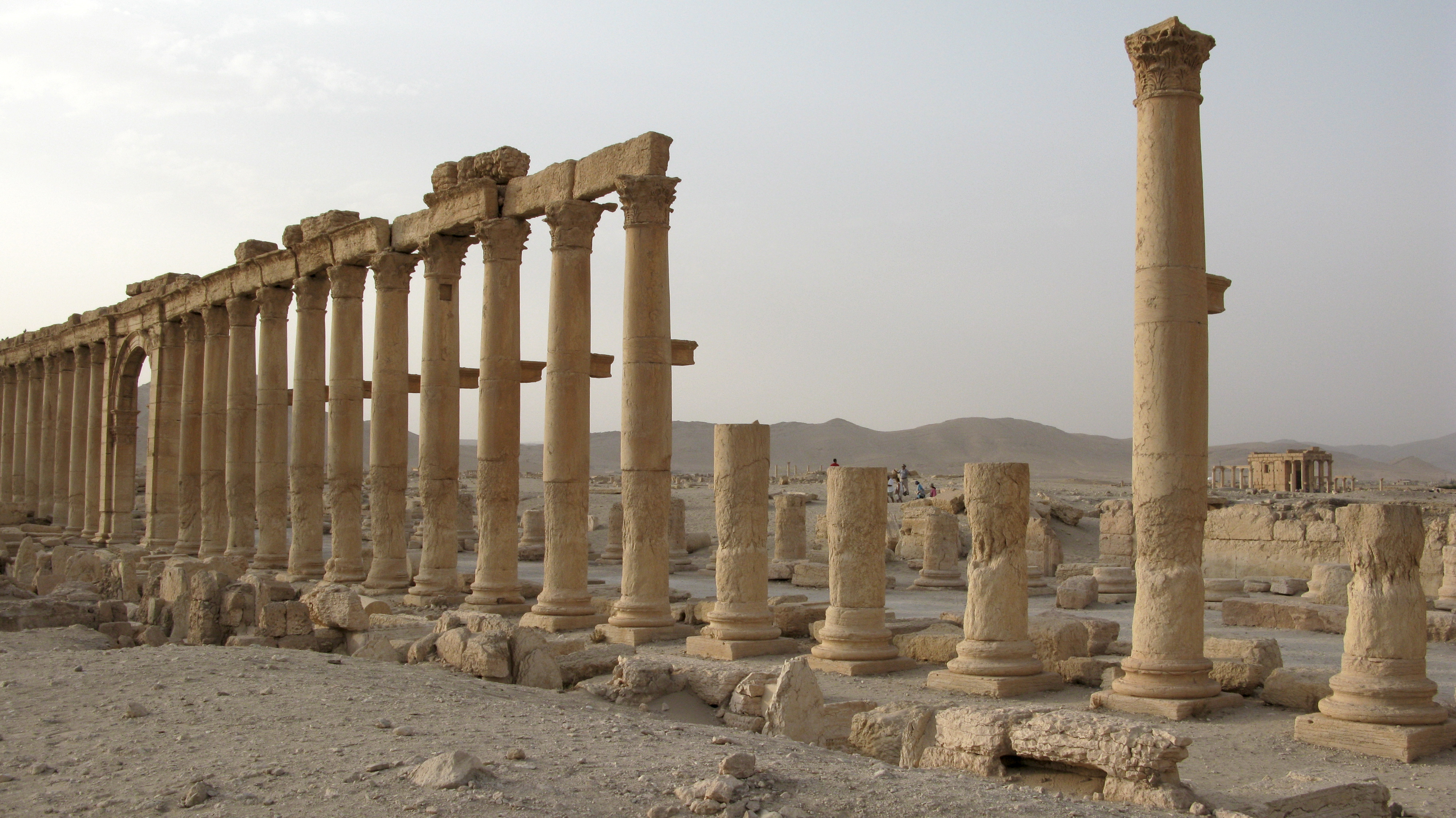
Sections of the Great Colonnade

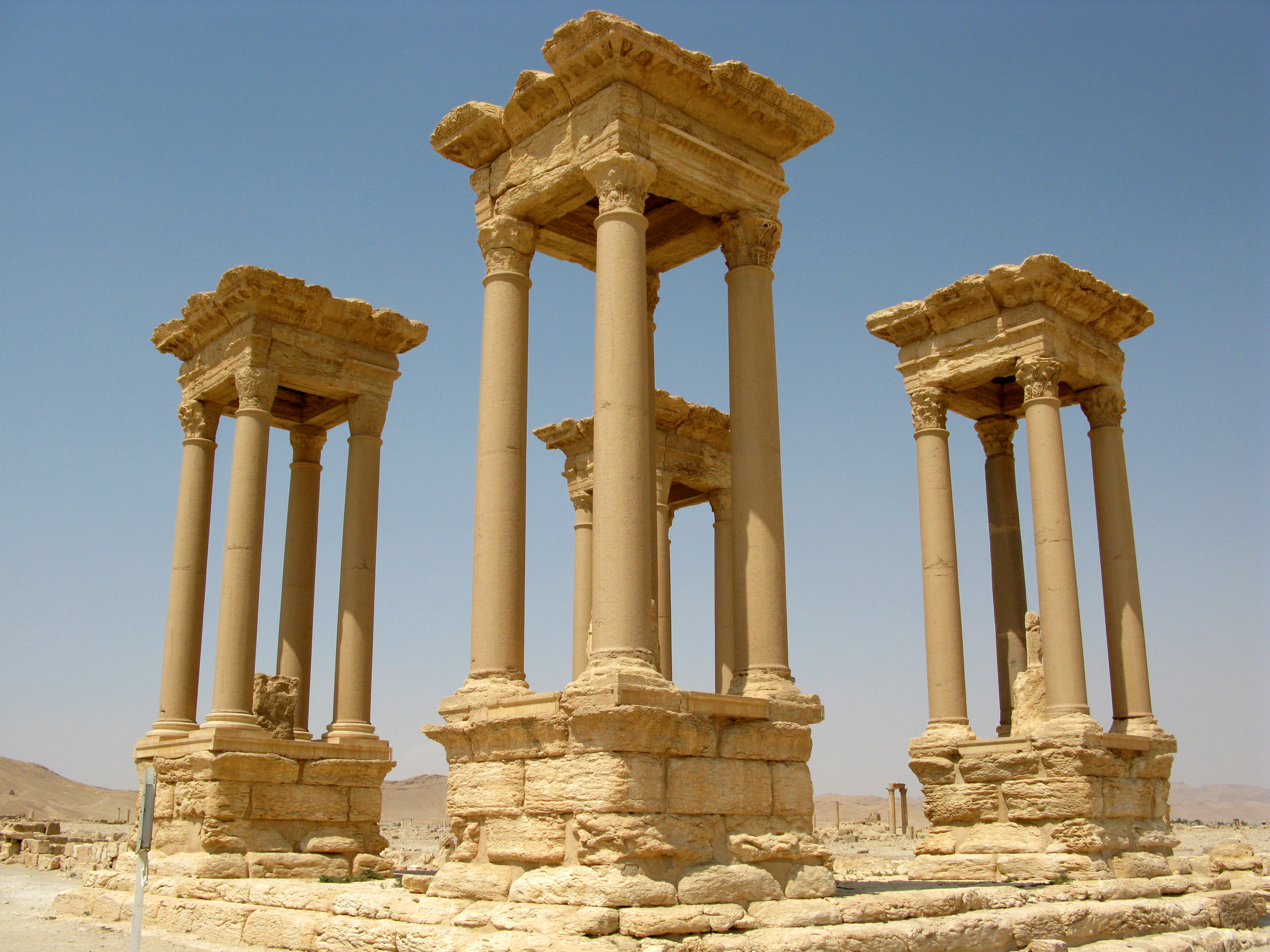
The Great Tetrapylon linking the west and central sections of the colonnade.

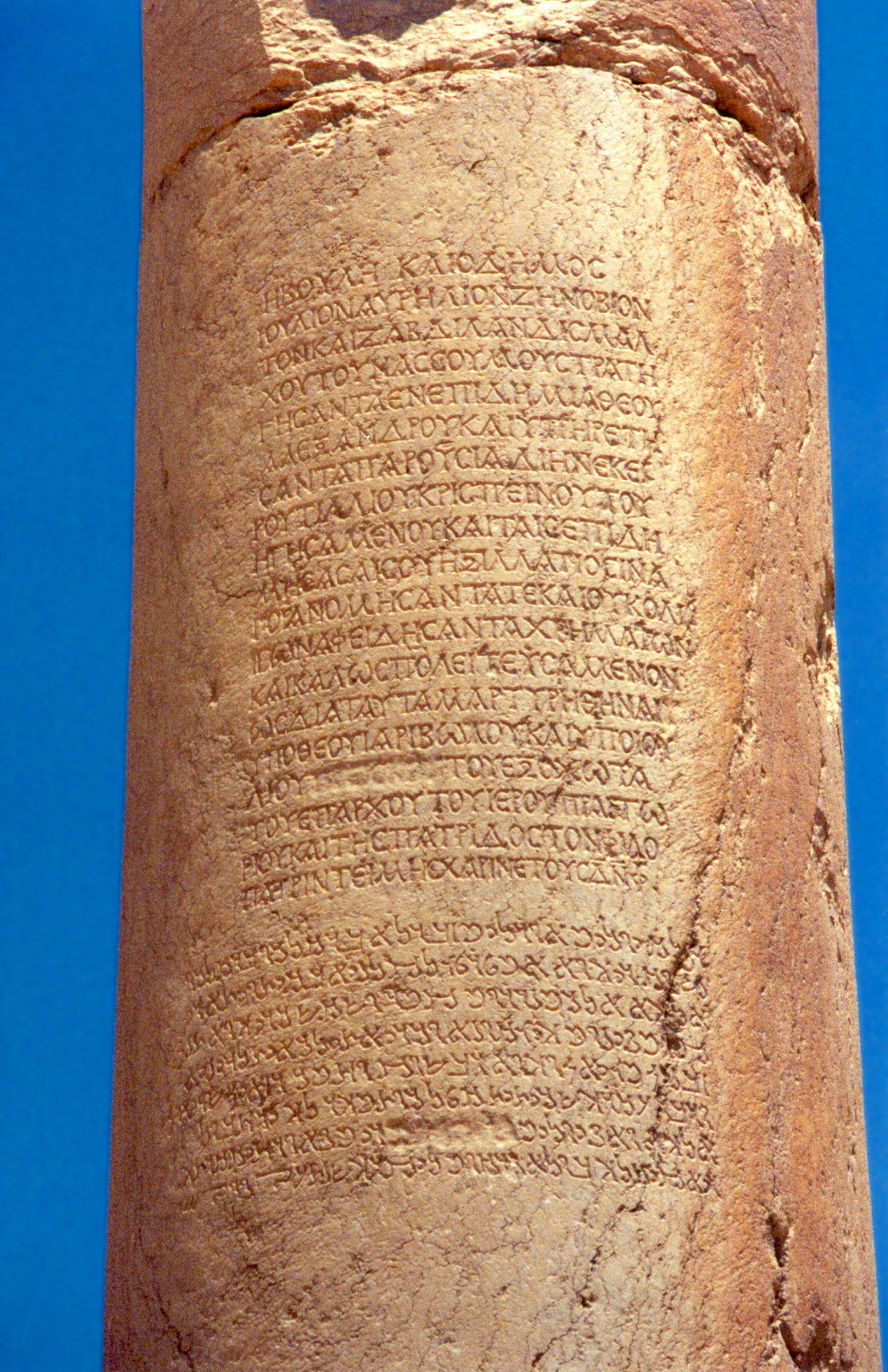
A dedicatory inscription on one of the columns.

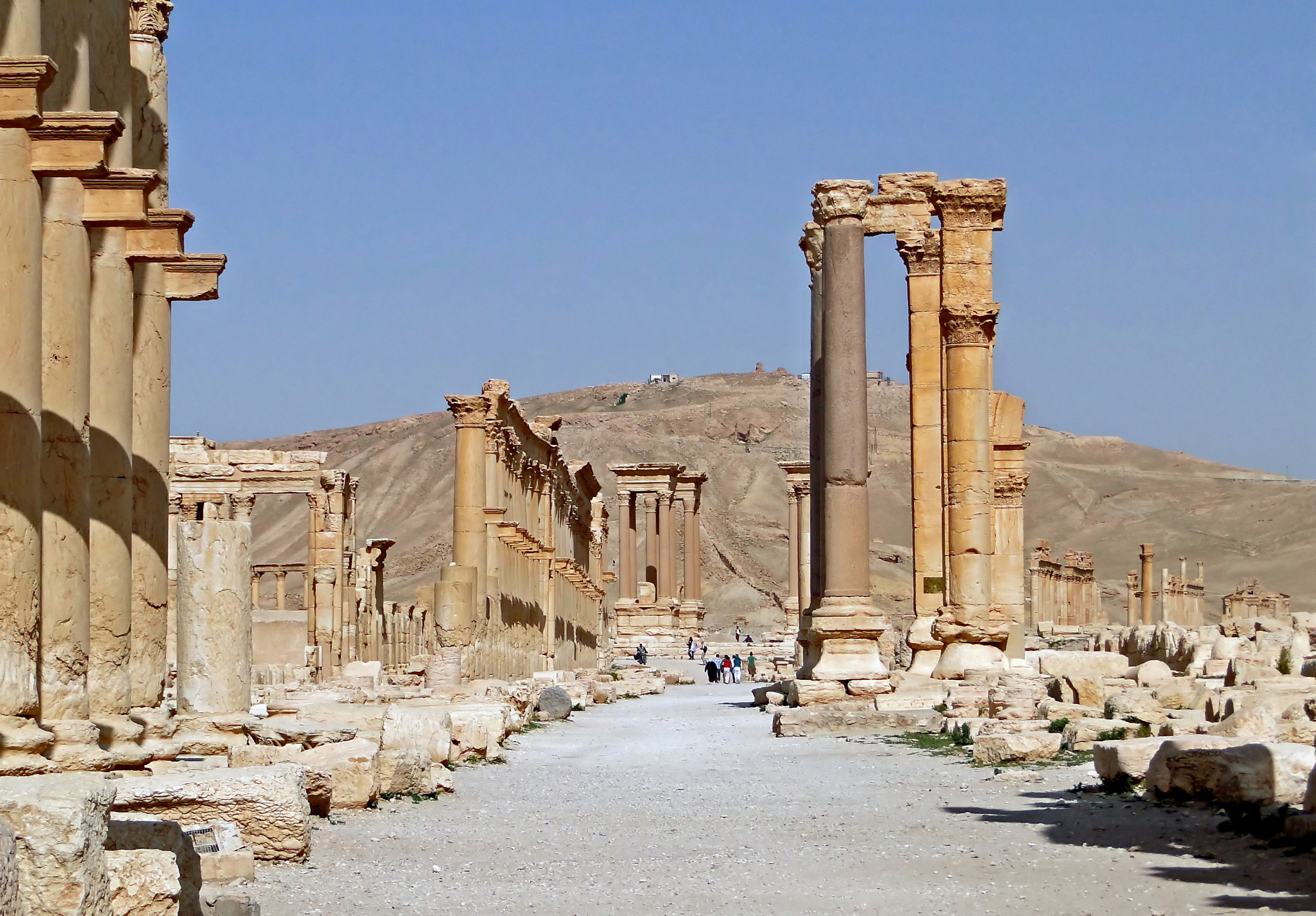
The central colonnade with the Great Tetrapylon looking west.

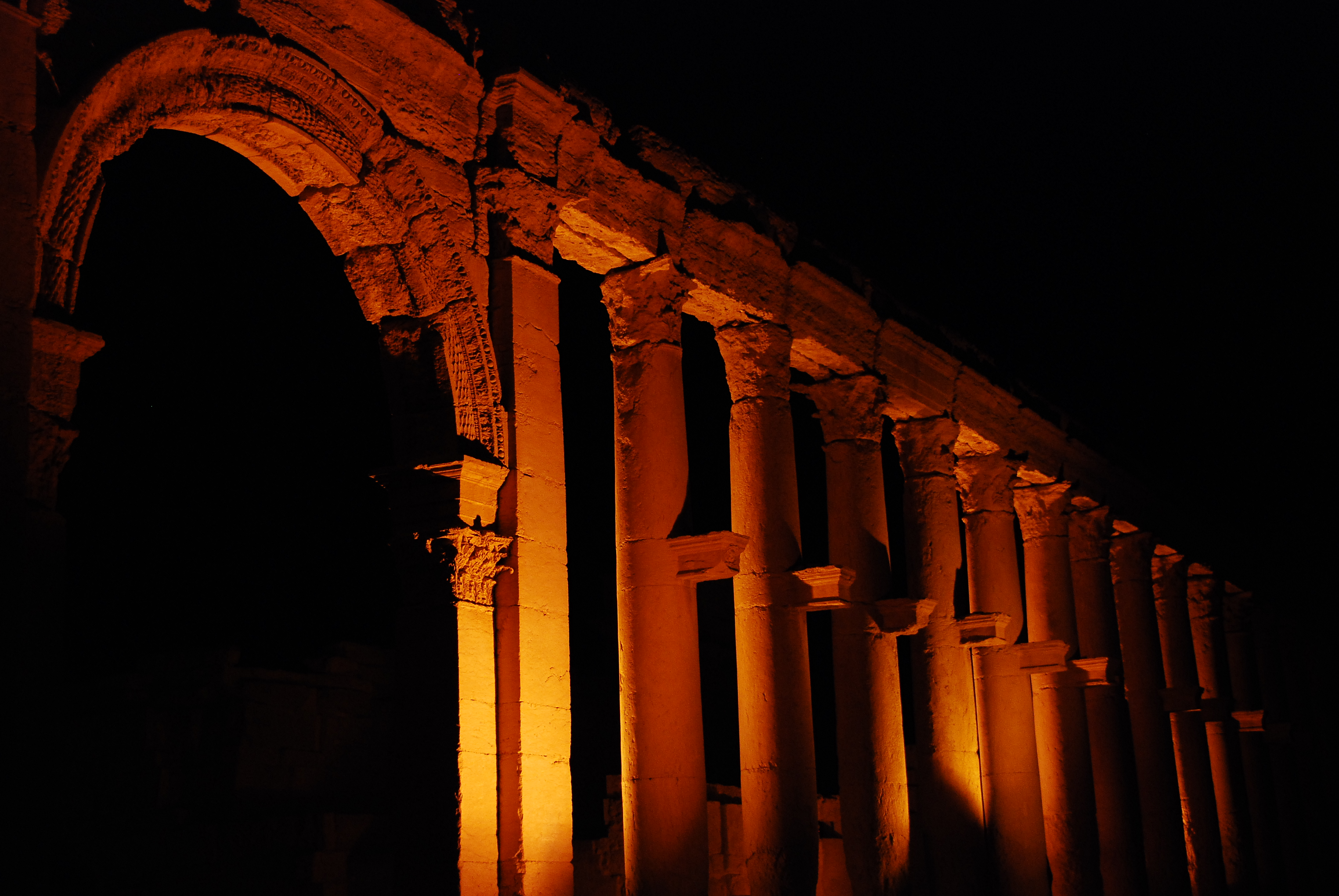
Monumental colonnade by night

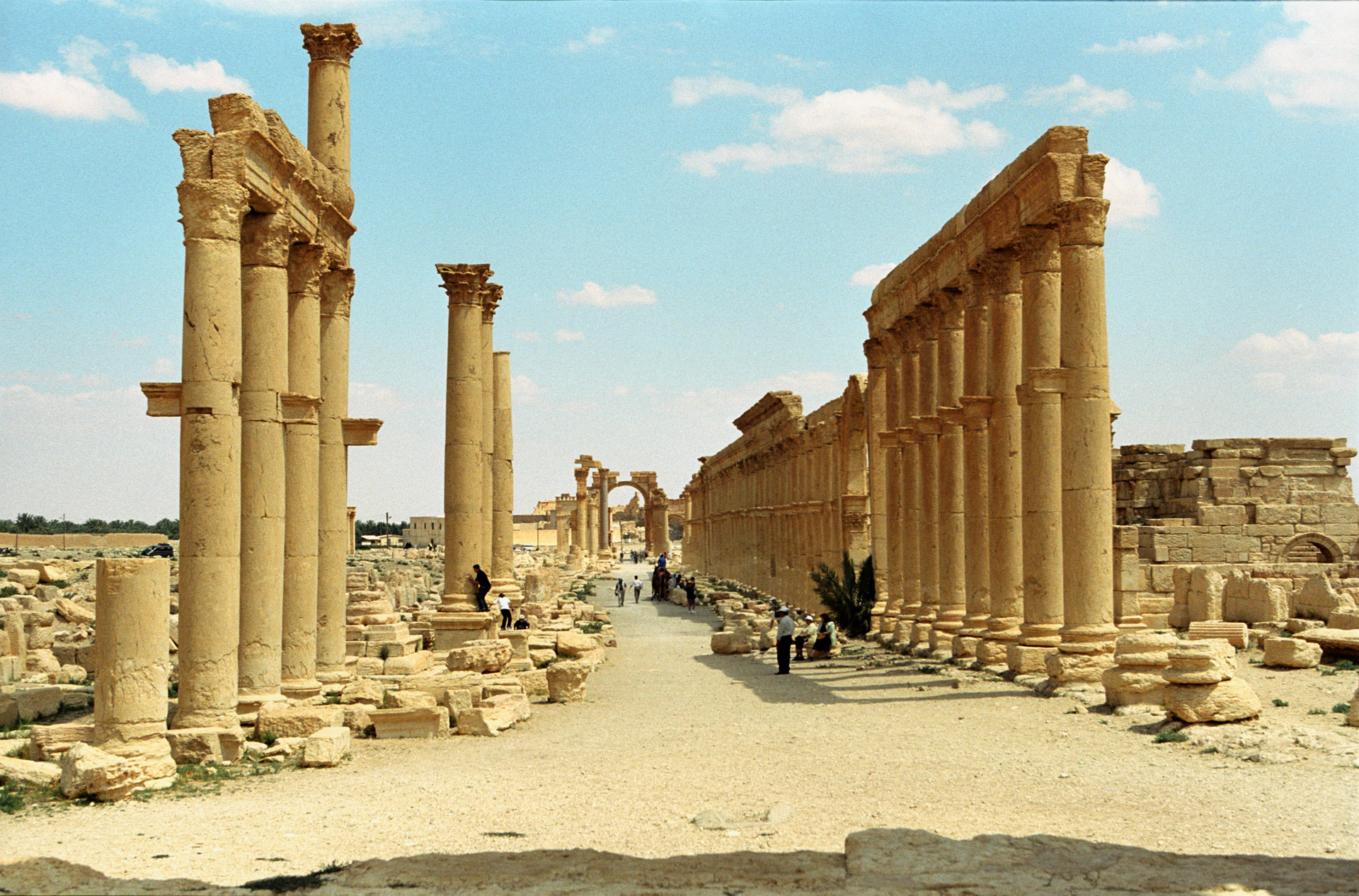
The central colonnade with the Monumental Arch looking east.

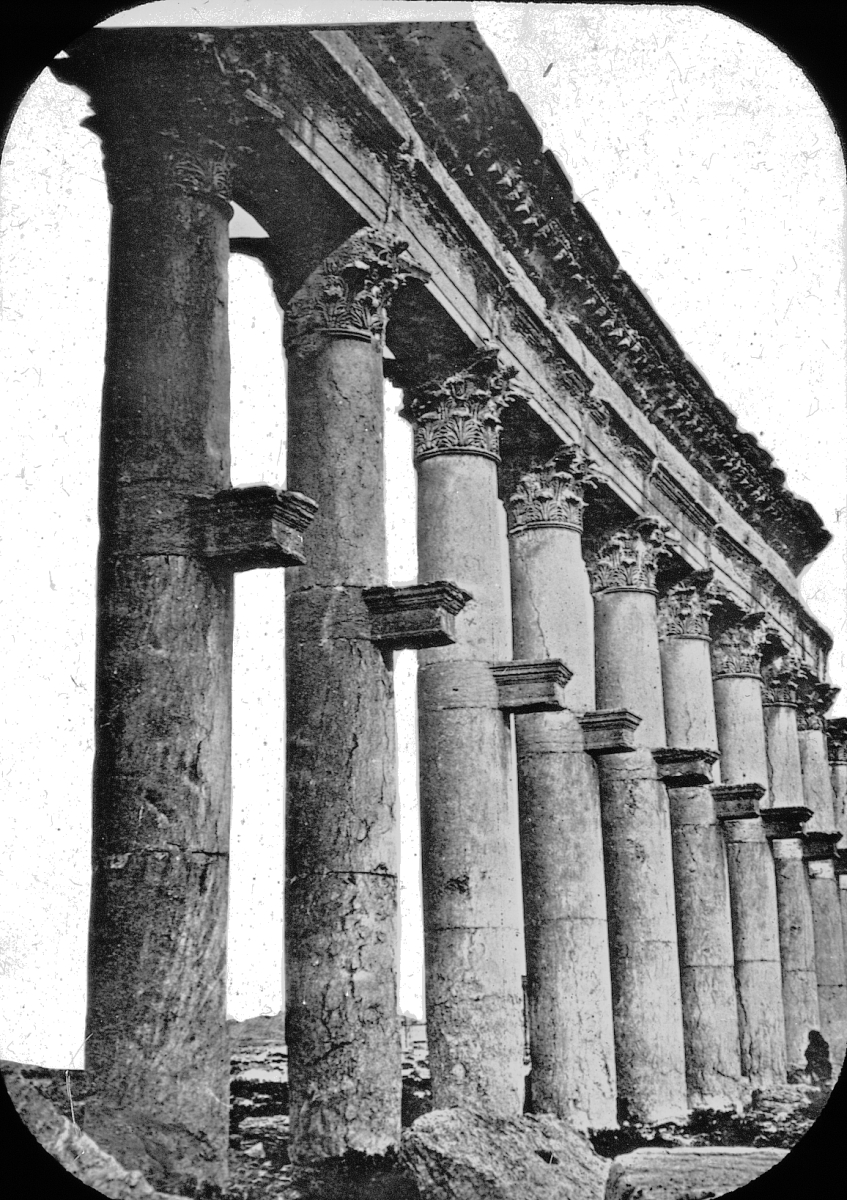
Palmyra, Syria. Colonnade, 19th century, Brooklyn Museum

== See also ==
- Great Colonnade at Apamea
