= Piliers de Tutelle =

Demolished Roman site in France

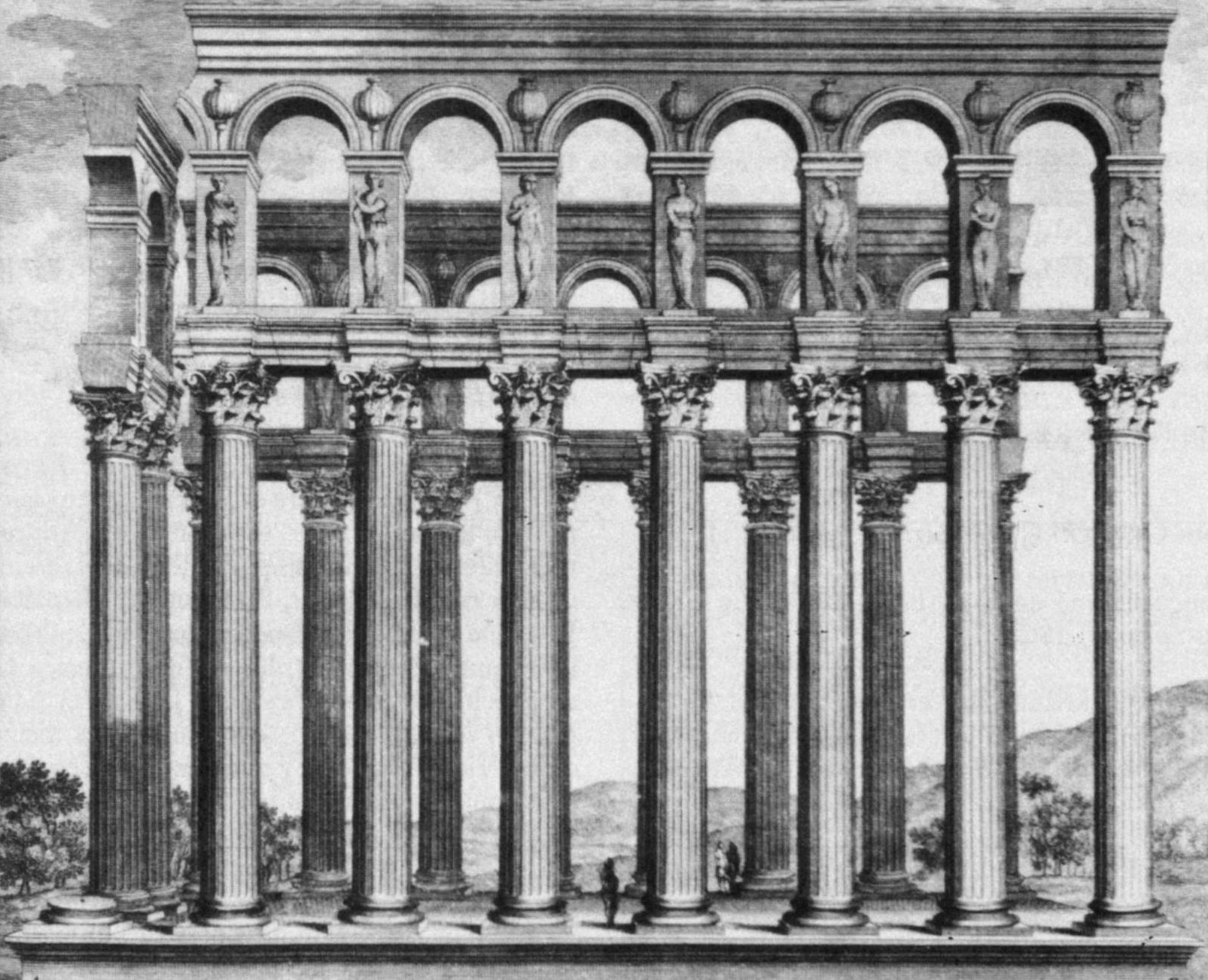
- Engraving of the Pillars

- Location within France
- 44°50′34″N 0°34′28″W
- Type: Roman forum or temple
- Location: Bordeaux, France
- Region: Gironde

History
- Built: 2nd/3rd cent. AD

Site notes
- Material: Marble
- Height: 26 m (85 ft)
- Length: 30 m (98 ft)
- Width: 20 m (66 ft)
- Condition: Demolished in 1677

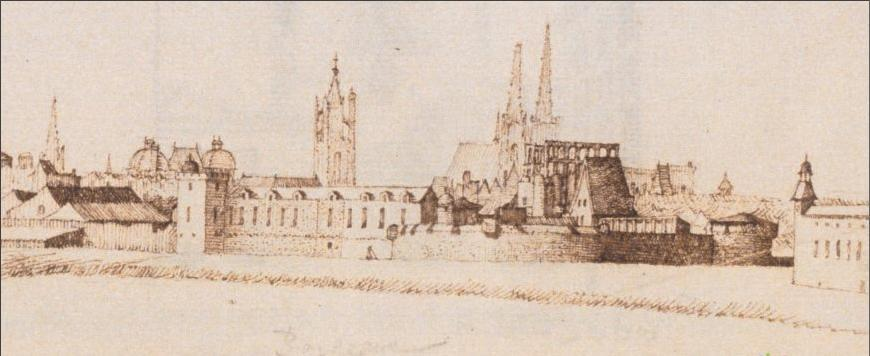
The Piliers de Tutelle in a 1640 panorama of Bordeaux. Drawing by Herman van der Hem.

The Piliers de Tutelle (meaning Pillars of Guardianship in French) was an important Gallo-Roman monument erected in the third century on the approximate location of the southwest corner of the Grand Théâtre of Bordeaux, a city in southwestern France. It was built around the late second century or early third century AD during the Roman period in France, and shares many features with similar pillared porticos and colonnades of the same period in other lands of the Roman Empire.

The tall, rectangular monument was composed of twenty-four tall columns topped by an architrave, and enhanced by an arcaded crowning decorated with bas reliefs on forty-four bilateral pillars placed above. The reliefs depicted young women standing upright (caryatids).

It was demolished in early 1677 during the transformation of Trompette Castle into a bastioned citadel by orders of the king of France, Louis XIV, known as the Sun King. Today the Piliers is only known through old engravings and contemporary testimonies of the time.

== Description ==
The Pillars of Guardianship were a Gallo-Roman monument in the Severian style made up of twenty-four Corinthian-style columns arranged in a rectangle. The plan and overall appearance of the structure, which is no longer preserved, has been handed down thanks to a drawing by architect Claude Perrault (1613-1688). It was a rectangular building, 30 meters long and 20 meters wide, supported by a double stylobate. It was made up of twenty-four columns, arranged eight lengthwise by six widthwise. The columns were twelve meters high, with a diameter of 1,35 meters and an intercolumn of 2.10 meters.

On top of the capitals of the columns laid an architrave, and on top of it were 44 pillars with bas reliefs of caryatids (female figures supporting a construction), one above each column and three meters in height in total. Above each female figure was a vase-shaped relief, and even higher than those were the transoms of large arches. Above those arches ran a second architrave, similar to the first one. The pillars with the reliefs were bilateral, meaning that the interior of the Piliers de Tutelle sported the same caryatids, vases and arches.

The building had a total height of twenty-six meters. The absence of a frame and roof is ground-breaking, because then buttresses would have been necessary given the height and width of the building.

On the side facing the city, twenty-one steps created a 3.30-meter tall staircase, whose height was even greater on the side towards the Garonne river, due to the natural slope of the terrain.

Under the double stylobate was a long, vaulted room, the ancient work of which still existed at the time of Élie Vinet (1509-1587).

The study of the lapidary collection kept at the Aquitaine Museum in Bordeaux made it possible to highlight a set of blocks that could belong to an elevation of the monument as described by Claude Perrault. These blocks are pieces of columns leaning against a wall, which could belong to a cella, which would attest to a religious function of the building.

== History ==
The Piliers de Tutelle were built around the late second or early third century under the Severan dynasty which brought the region a period of prosperity from which Bordeaux greatly benefited.

The Pillars have long been considered to have been a temple dedicated to the tutelary goddess of the city of Bordeaux, hence the name given to them, though the notable absence of framework and roof is more reminiscent of part of the forum of the Roman city, especially since it was located on the highest point of the city, overlooking the river and its port. However, recent excavations in 2003 made it possible to discover a peribolos, which confirms that it indeed functioned as a temple.

Pillared porticos

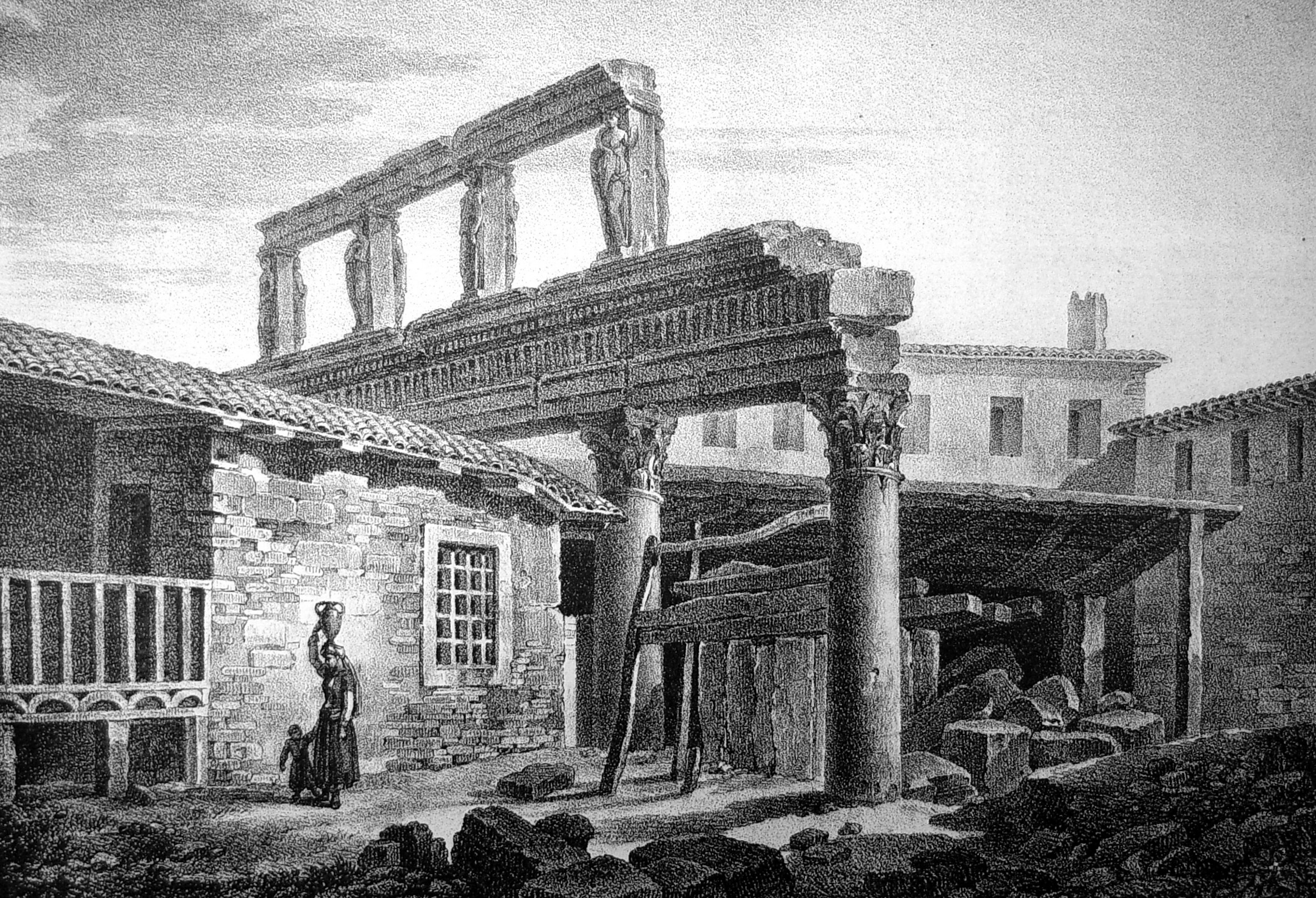
Las Incantadas (Salonica)

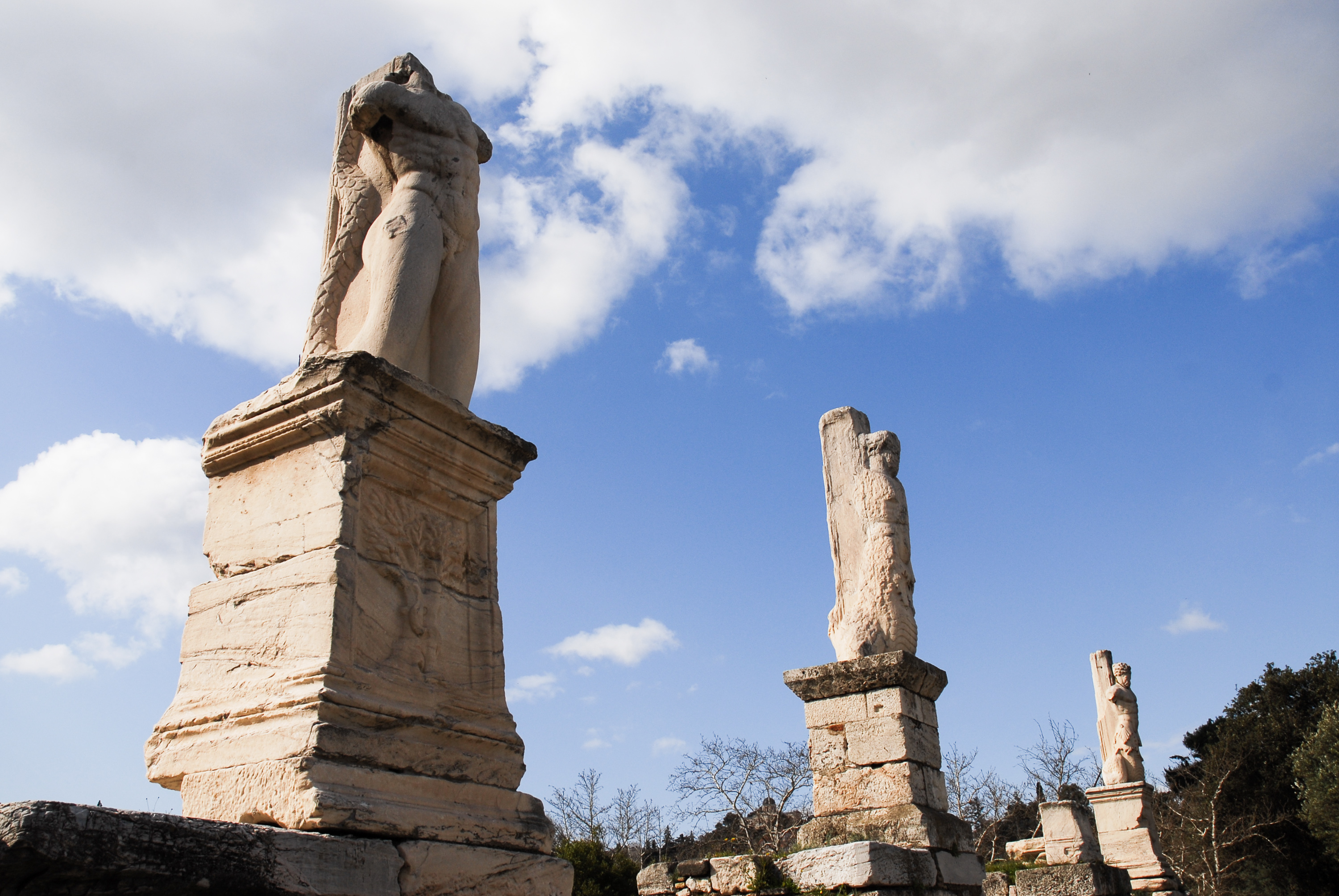
Portico of the Giants (Athens)

In the middle of the 9th century, the Arab geographer Al-Himyarī described this monument for the first time, writing that "north of Bordeaux is a building that can be seen from afar and which rests on tall, thick columns: this was the palace of Titus".

The building, already in a very poor condition, was finally razed to the ground in February 1677 by Vauban on the orders of Louis XIV who wished, after the troubles of the Fronde and the bloody revolt of the populace, to clear the glacis of the Trompette Castle in order to facilitate the firing of cannons at the rebellious city.

In 1930, long after the demolishing of the ancient monument, French archaeologist Paul Perdrizet noted its architectural connection to the similar, but much smaller remains of a pillared Roman portico from Thessalonica known as Las Incantadas, which was also made up of tall columns, an architrave above them and pillars with reliefs on top (though no arcade was preserved, or even known to have existed at all). Las Incantadas was too demolished in 1864, when Frenchman Emmanuel Miller brought it down in order to transfer its pillars with the sculptures to France. They still remain in the Louvre to this day. The Piliers de Tutelle was also compared to the so-called "Portico of the Giants" from the Odeon of Agrippa in the Ancient Agora of Athens.

The Place de la Comédie sits now on the spot the Pillars once stood. They were located at the western end of the Grand Théâtre terrace, facing rue Mautrec. All that remains now are old engravings and a street that bears their name.

== Sources ==
- Barraud, Dany; Caillabet-Duloum, Geneviève (2007). Burdigala. Bilan de deux siècles de recherches et découvertes récentes à Bordeaux (PDF). Simulacra Romae I. p. 33.
- Barraud, Dany; Sireix, Charles (2010). Burdigala à la lumière des nouvelles découvertes. Simulacra Romae II. p. 10.
